= Region of Peel Secondary Schools Athletic Association =

Canadian sporting association

The Region of Peel Secondary Schools Athletic Association or ROPSSAA is a high school league for 35 sports. It has 69 member schools throughout the Region of Peel from the Peel District School Board, the Dufferin-Peel Catholic District School Board, and 7 private schools. It is a member of the Ontario Federation of School Athletic Associations (OFSAA).

== Sports included ==
Each year ROPSSAA contests championships in the following sports:

- Alpine Skiing
- Archery
- Association football
- Badminton
- Baseball
- Basketball
- Bocce
- Cricket
- Cross Country
- Curling
- Fast Pitch Softball
- Field Hockey
- Football
- Flag Football
- Golf
- Gymnastics
- Ice hockey
- Lacrosse
- Nordic Skiing
- Pickleball
- Rugby union
- slow-pitch softball
- Special Event Track & Field
- Swimming
- Table Tennis
- Tennis
- Track and Field
- Ultimate Frisbee
- Volleyball
- Wrestling

== Member schools ==
Member schools include:

- Applewood Heights Secondary School
- Applewood Acres
- Ascension of Our Lord Secondary School
- Blyth Academy
- Bramalea Secondary School
- Brampton Centennial Secondary School
- Brampton Christian School
- Bronte College
- Cardinal Ambrozic Secondary School
- Cardinal Leger Secondary School
- Castlebrooke Secondary School
- Cawthra Park Secondary School
- Central Peel Secondary School
- Chinguacousy Secondary School
- Clarkson Secondary School
- David Suzuki Secondary School
- Erindale Secondary School
- Father Michael Goetz Secondary School
- Fletcher's Meadow Secondary School
- Glenforest Secondary School
- Harold M. Brathwaite Secondary School
- Heart Lake Secondary School
- Holy Name of Mary Secondary School
- The Humberview School
- Iona Catholic Secondary School
- Jean Augustine Secondary School
- École Jeunes sans Frontieres
- John Cabot Catholic Secondary School
- John Fraser Secondary School
- Judith Nyman Secondary School
- Lincoln M. Alexander Secondary School
- Lorne Park Secondary School
- Louise Arbour Secondary School
- Loyola Catholic Secondary School
- Mayfield Secondary School
- Meadowvale Secondary School
- Mentor College
- Mississauga Secondary School
- North Park Secondary School
- Notre Dame Catholic Secondary School
- Olive Grove Secondary School
- Our Lady of Mount Carmel Catholic Secondary School
- Parkholme School
- Philip Pocock Catholic Secondary School
- Philopateer Christian College
- Port Credit Secondary School
- Rick Hansen Secondary School
- Robert F. Hall Catholic Secondary School
- Sandalwood Heights Secondary School
- Sherwood Heights School
- St. Aloysius Gonzaga Secondary School
- St. Augustine Catholic Secondary School
- St. Edmund Campion Secondary School
- St. Francis Xavier Secondary School
- St. Joan of Arc Secondary School
- St. Joseph's Secondary School
- St. Marcellinius Secondary School
- St. Marguerite d'Youville Secondary School
- St. Martin Catholic Secondary School
- St. Michael Catholic Secondary School
- St. Paul Secondary School
- St. Roch Secondary School
- St. Thomas Aquinas Secondary School
- Sainte Famille
- Stephen Lewis Secondary School
- Streetsville Secondary School
- T. L. Kennedy Secondary School
- Turner Fenton Secondary School
- West Credit Secondary School
- The Woodlands School
