= Brampton High School =

Former high school in Brampton, Ontario, Canada

Brampton High School was a high school in Brampton, Ontario, Canada established in 1877, to accommodate the older students of Central Public and Grammar School. The photo from PAMA shows the main front doors; left doors for the boys, right doors for the girls. The school footprint was Centre Street, McCaul Street, Sophia Street and Church Street.

Students from the school were dispersed to the existing Central Peel Secondary School in Brampton, new Brampton Centennial Secondary School, and the J. A. Turner Secondary School in Toronto Township.

The Brampton High School structure was used in 1967 as one of Sheridan College's first two campuses, the second being in Port Credit. Most of their 1200 students in 1969 were at the Brampton campus. In 1972, in response to a freeze in new government construction, one official commented "the old Brampton high school is going to fall down pretty soon, I suppose." Sheridan moved out in 1977.

The structure was put up for sale in 1977 at a cost of $1 million, when the Peel Board of Education deemed that fire safety renovations were too costly to pursue. Demolish the old school is now a residential area surrounding Sheridan Parkette.
