= List of secondary schools in Ontario =

There are numerous secondary schools in Ontario. Secondary education policy in the Canadian province of Ontario is governed by the Ministry of Education. Secondary education in Ontario includes Grades 9 to 12. The following list includes public secular institutions, public separate schools, and privately managed independent schools in Ontario. All public schools in Ontario (secular and separate) operate as a part of either an English first language school board or a French first language school board.

Although Ontario's secular and separate school systems are both considered public, colloquially the term public school typically distinguishes a secular institution from its separate counterparts: institutions operated by a public secular school board are typically referred to as public schools, whereas institutions operated by a public separate school board are typically referred to as Catholic schools. (Note: Formally, depending on the school district, separate schools may be Catholic or Protestant. Only one Protestant separate school board operates in Ontario (which does not operate any secondary schools); all other separate school boards in Ontario are Catholic.)

Public secular secondary schools may operate under a number of designations, including collegiate institute, école secondaire, high school, and secondary school. Public separate secondary schools are typically named academy, Catholic high school, Catholic secondary school, college school or école secondaire catholique.

== Algoma District ==
=== English public ===
- Central Algoma Secondary School, Desbarats
- Chapleau High School, Chapleau
- Elliot Lake Secondary School, Elliot Lake
- Hornepayne High School, Hornepayne
- Korah Collegiate & Vocational School, Sault Ste. Marie
- Michipicoten High School, Wawa
- Superior Heights Collegiate and Vocational School, Sault Ste. Marie
- W. C. Eaket Secondary School, Blind River
- White Pines Collegiate & Vocational School, Sault Ste. Marie

=== French public ===
- École secondaire l'Orée des Bois, Dubreuilville
- Villa Française des Jeunes, Elliot Lake

=== English Catholic ===
- Holy Angels Learning Centre, Sault Ste. Marie
- St. Mary's College, Sault Ste. Marie

=== French Catholic ===
- École secondaire catholique Jeunesse-Nord, Blind River
- École secondaire Notre-Dame-du-Sault, Sault Ste. Marie
- École secondaire Saint-Joseph, Wawa

== Brant County ==
=== English public ===
- Brantford Collegiate Institute and Vocational School, Brantford
- North Park Collegiate and Vocational School, Brantford
- Paris District High School, Paris
- Pauline Johnson Collegiate & Vocational School, Brantford
- Tollgate Technological Skills Centre, Brantford

=== English Catholic ===
- Assumption College School, Brantford
- St. John's College, Brantford

== Bruce County ==
=== English public ===
- Bruce Peninsula District School, Lion's Head
- Kincardine & District Secondary School, Kincardine
- Peninsula Shores District School, Wiarton
- Saugeen District Secondary School, Port Elgin
- Walkerton District Community School, Walkerton

=== English Catholic ===
- Sacred Heart High School, Walkerton

== Municipality of Chatham-Kent ==
=== English public ===
- Blenheim District High School, Blenheim
- Chatham-Kent Secondary School, Chatham
- John McGregor Secondary School, Chatham
- Lambton-Kent Composite School, Dresden
- Ridgetown District High School, Ridgetown
- Tilbury District High School, Tilbury
- Wallaceburg District Secondary School, Wallaceburg

=== English Catholic ===
- Ursuline College Chatham, Chatham

=== French Catholic ===
- École secondaire catholique de Pain Court, Pain Court

== Cochrane District ==
=== English public ===
- École Secondaire Cochrane High School, Cochrane
- Hearst High School, Hearst
- Iroquois Falls Secondary School, Iroquois Falls
- Kapuskasing District High School, Kapuskasing
- Roland Michener Secondary School, South Porcupine
- Timmins High and Vocational School, Timmins
- Northern Lights Secondary School, Moosonee

=== French public ===
- École secondaire l'Alliance, Iroquois Falls
- École Publique Renaissance, Timmins

=== English Catholic ===
- O'Gorman High School, Timmins

=== French Catholic ===
- École catholique Georges-Vanier, Smooth Rock Falls
- École catholique Nouveau-Regard, Cochrane
- École secondaire catholique l'Alliance, Iroquois Falls
- École secondaire catholique Cité des Jeunes, Kapuskasing
- École secondaire catholique de Hearst, Hearst
- École secondaire catholique Thériault, Timmins
- La Clef, Timmins

=== Private ===
- Delores D. Echum Composite School, Moose Factory

== Dufferin County ==
=== English public ===
- Centre Dufferin District High School, Shelburne
- Orangeville District Secondary School, Orangeville
- Westside Secondary School, Orangeville

== Regional Municipality of Durham ==
=== English public ===
- Ajax High School, Ajax
- Anderson Collegiate Vocational Institute, Whitby
- Bowmanville High School, Bowmanville
- Brock High School, Cannington
- Brooklin High School, Whitby
- Cedar Valley Secondary School, Oshawa
- Clarington Central Secondary School, Bowmanville
- Clarke High School, Newcastle
- Courtice Secondary School, Courtice
- Donald A. Wilson Secondary School, Whitby
- Dunbarton High School, Pickering
- Durham Alternative Secondary School, Oshawa
- Eastdale Collegiate and Vocational Institute, Oshawa
- G. L. Roberts Collegiate and Vocational Institute, Oshawa
- Henry Street High School, Whitby
- J. Clarke Richardson Collegiate, Ajax
- Maxwell Heights Secondary School, Oshawa
- O'Neill Collegiate and Vocational Institute, Oshawa
- Pickering High School, Ajax
- Pine Ridge Secondary School, Pickering
- Port Perry High School, Port Perry
- R. S. McLaughlin Collegiate and Vocational Institute, Oshawa
- Sinclair Secondary School, Whitby
- Uxbridge Secondary School, Uxbridge

=== English Catholic ===
- All Saints Catholic Secondary School, Whitby
- Archbishop Denis O'Connor Catholic High School, Ajax
- Father Leo J. Austin Catholic Secondary School, Whitby
- Holy Trinity Secondary School, Courtice
- Monsignor John Pereyma Catholic Secondary School, Oshawa
- Monsignor Paul Dwyer Catholic High School, Oshawa
- Notre Dame Catholic Secondary School, Ajax
- St. Mary Catholic Secondary School, Pickering
- St. Stephen's Secondary School, Bowmanville

=== French Catholic ===
- École secondaire catholique Saint-Charles-Garnier, Whitby

=== French public ===
- École secondaire Ronald-Marion, Pickering

=== Private ===
- Trafalgar Castle School, Whitby
- Kingsway College, Oshawa

== Elgin County ==
=== English public ===
- Central Elgin Collegiate Institute, St. Thomas
- East Elgin Secondary School, Aylmer
- Parkside Collegiate Institute, St. Thomas
- West Elgin Secondary School, West Lorne

=== English Catholic ===
- St. Joseph's Catholic High School, St. Thomas

== Essex County and Windsor ==
=== English public ===
- Belle River District High School, Belle River
- Essex District High School, Essex
- Kennedy Collegiate Institute, Windsor
- Kingsville District High School, Kingsville
- Leamington District Secondary School, Leamington
- North Star High School, Amherstburg
- Riverside Secondary School, Windsor
- Sandwich Secondary School, LaSalle
- Tecumseh Vista Academy Secondary School, Tecumseh
- Vincent Massey Secondary School, Windsor
- W. F. Herman Academy Secondary School, Windsor
- Walkerville Collegiate Institute, Windsor
- Westview Freedom Academy (formerly named Century Secondary School), Windsor

=== French public ===
- École secondaire de Lamothe-Cadillac (formerly named École secondaire Michel-Gratton), Windsor

=== English Catholic ===
- Assumption College School, Windsor
- Cardinal Carter Catholic High School, Leamington
- Catholic Central High School, Windsor
- F. J. Brennan Catholic High School, Windsor
- Holy Names High School, Windsor
- St. Anne Catholic High School, Lakeshore
- St. Joseph's Catholic High School, Windsor
- St. Michael's Alternative High School, Essex and Windsor
- St. Thomas of Villanova Catholic Secondary School, LaSalle

=== French Catholic ===
- École secondaire catholique E. J. Lajeunesse, Windsor
- École secondaire catholique l'Essor, Tecumseh

== Frontenac County ==
=== English public ===
- Bayridge Secondary School, Kingston
- Frontenac Secondary School, Kingston
- Kingston Secondary School, Kingston
- La Salle Secondary School, Kingston
- Loyalist Collegiate and Vocational Institute, Kingston
- Limestone School of Community Education, Kingston
- Granite Ridge Education Centre, Sharbot Lake
- Sydenham High School, Sydenham

=== French public ===
- École secondaire publique Mille-Îles, Kingston

=== English Catholic ===
- Holy Cross Catholic Secondary School, Kingston
- Regiopolis-Notre Dame Catholic Secondary School, Kingston

=== French Catholic ===
- École secondaire catholique Marie-Rivier, Kingston

== Grey County ==
=== English public ===
- Georgian Bay Community School, Meaford
- Grey Highlands Secondary School, Flesherton
- John Diefenbaker Secondary School, Hanover
- Owen Sound District Secondary School, Owen Sound

=== English Catholic ===
- St. Mary's High School, Owen Sound

=== French Catholic ===
- École secondaire catholique Saint-Dominique-Savio, Owen Sound

== Haldimand County ==
=== English public ===
- Cayuga Secondary School, Cayuga
- Dunnville Secondary School, Dunnville
- Hagersville Secondary School, Hagersville
- McKinnon Park Secondary School, Caledonia

== Haliburton County ==
=== English public ===
- Haliburton Highlands Secondary School, Haliburton

== Regional Municipality of Halton ==
=== English public ===
- Abbey Park High School, Oakville
- Acton District High School, Acton
- Aldershot High School, Aldershot
- Burlington Central High School, Burlington
- Craig Kielburger Secondary School, Milton
- Dr. Frank J. Hayden Secondary School, Burlington
- Elsie MacGill Secondary School, Milton
- Garth Webb Secondary School, Oakville
- Georgetown District High School, Georgetown
- Iroquois Ridge High School, Oakville
- M. M. Robinson High School, Burlington
- Milton District High School, Milton
- Nelson High School, Burlington
- Oakville Trafalgar High School, Oakville
- T. A. Blakelock High School, Oakville
- White Oaks Secondary School, Oakville

=== French public ===
- École secondaire Gaétan Gervais, Oakville

=== English Catholic ===
- Assumption Catholic Secondary School, Burlington
- Bishop Paul Francis Reding Catholic Secondary School, Milton
- Christ the King Catholic Secondary School, Georgetown
- Corpus Christi Catholic Secondary School, Burlington
- Holy Trinity Catholic Secondary School, Oakville
- Notre Dame Catholic Secondary School, Burlington
- St. Francis Xavier Catholic Secondary School, Milton
- St. Ignatius of Loyola Catholic Secondary School, Oakville
- St. Kateri Tekakwitha Catholic Secondary School, Milton
- St. Thomas Aquinas Catholic Secondary School, Oakville

=== French Catholic ===
- École secondaire catholique Sainte-Trinité, Oakville

=== Private ===
- Appleby College, Oakville
- St. Mildred's-Lightbourn School, Oakville
- King's Christian Collegiate, Oakville

== Hamilton ==
=== English public ===
- Ancaster High School, Ancaster
- Bernie Custis Secondary School, Hamilton
- Dundas Valley Secondary School, Dundas
- Glendale Secondary School, Hamilton
- Nora Frances Henderson Secondary School, Hamilton
- Orchard Park Secondary School, Stoney Creek
- Saltfleet District High School, Stoney Creek
- Sherwood Secondary School, Hamilton
- Sir Allan MacNab Secondary School, Hamilton
- Sir Winston Churchill Secondary School, Hamilton
- Waterdown District High School, Waterdown
- Westdale Secondary School, Hamilton
- Westmount Secondary School, Hamilton

=== French public ===
- École secondaire Georges-P.-Vanier, Hamilton

=== English Catholic ===
- Bishop Ryan, Hamilton
- Bishop Tonnos, Ancaster
- Cathedral High School, Hamilton
- Good Shepherd Hamilton, Downtown Hamilton
- St. Jean de Brebeuf Secondary School, Hamilton
- St. John Henry Newman, Stoney Creek
- St. Mary Catholic Secondary, Hamilton
- St. Thomas More, Hamilton

=== French Catholic ===
- École secondaire Académie catholique Mère-Teresa, Hamilton

=== English private ===
- Columbia International College, Westdale
- Hamilton District Christian High School, Ancaster
- Hillfield Strathallan College, West Mountain Hamilton
- Southern Ontario College, Downtown Hamilton

== Hastings County ==
=== English public ===
- Bayside Secondary School, Belleville
- Centennial Secondary School, Belleville
- Centre Hastings Secondary School, Madoc
- Eastside Secondary School, Belleville (formerly Moira)
- North Hastings High School, Bancroft
- Trenton High School, Trenton

=== French public ===
- École secondaire publique Marc-Garneau, Trenton

=== Private (independent) ===
- Albert College (Pre-Kindergarten to Grade 12), Belleville

=== English Catholic/Christian ===
- Nicholson Catholic College, Belleville
- Quinte Christian High School, Belleville
- St. Paul Catholic Secondary School, Trenton
- St. Theresa Catholic Secondary School, Belleville

=== First Nations Private ===
- Ohahase Education Centre, Tyendinaga Mohawk Territory

== Huron County ==
=== English public ===
- Central Huron Secondary School, Clinton
- F. E. Madill Secondary School, Wingham
- Goderich District Collegiate Institute, Goderich
- South Huron District High School, Exeter
- Stephen Central Public School, Dashwood

=== English Catholic ===
- St. Anne's Catholic Secondary School, Clinton

== Kawartha Lakes ==
=== English public ===
- Fenelon Falls Secondary School, Fenelon Falls
- I. E. Weldon Secondary School, Lindsay
- Lindsay Collegiate and Vocational Institute, Lindsay

=== English Catholic ===
- St. Thomas Aquinas Secondary School, Lindsay

== Kenora District ==
=== English public ===
- Beaver Brae Secondary School, Kenora
- Crolancia Secondary School, Pickle Lake
- Dryden High School, Dryden
- Ignace High School, Ignace
- Northern Eagle High School, Ear Falls
- Sioux North High School, Sioux Lookout
- Red Lake District High School, Red Lake
- Vezina Secondary School, Attawapiskat

=== English Catholic ===
- St. Thomas Aquinas Secondary School, Kenora

== Lambton County ==
=== English public ===
- Alexander Mackenzie Secondary School, Sarnia
- Great Lakes Secondary School, Sarnia
- Lambton Collegiate and Vocational Institute, Petrolia
- North Lambton Secondary School, Forest
- Northern Collegiate Institute and Vocational School, Sarnia

=== French public ===
- École secondaire Franco-Jeunesse, Sarnia

=== English Catholic ===
- St. Christopher Catholic Secondary School, Sarnia
- St. Patrick Catholic High School, Sarnia

=== French Catholic ===
- École secondaire catholique Saint-François-Xavier, Sarnia

== Lanark County ==
=== English public ===
- Almonte and District High School, Almonte
- Carleton Place High School, Carleton Place
- Perth and District Collegiate Institute, Perth
- Smiths Falls District Collegiate Institute, Smiths Falls

=== English Catholic ===
- Notre Dame Catholic High School, Carleton Place
- St. John Catholic High School, Perth
- St. Luke Catholic High School, Smiths Falls

== Leeds and Grenville United Counties ==
=== English public ===
- Athens District High School, Athens
- Brockville Collegiate Institute, Brockville
- Gananoque Secondary School, Gananoque
- North Grenville District High School, Kemptville
- Rideau District High School, Elgin
- South Grenville District High School, Prescott
- Thousand Islands Secondary School, Brockville

=== English Catholic ===
- St. Mary Catholic High School, Brockville
- St. Michael Catholic High School, Kemptville

=== French Catholic ===
- Académie catholique Ange Gabriel, Brockville

== Lennox and Addington County ==
=== English public ===
- Ernestown Intermediate and Secondary School, Odessa
- Napanee District Secondary School, Napanee
- North Addington Education Centre (K-12), Cloyne

== Manitoulin District ==
=== English public ===
- Manitoulin Secondary School, M'Chigeeng

== Middlesex County ==
=== English public ===
- A. B. Lucas Secondary School, London
- Clarke Road Secondary School, London
- Glencoe District High School, Glencoe
- H. B. Beal Secondary School, London
- London Central Secondary School, London
- London South Collegiate Institute, London
- Lord Dorchester Secondary School - Dorchester
- Medway High School - Arva
- Montcalm Secondary School, London
- North Middlesex District High School, Parkhill
- Oakridge Secondary School, London
- Saunders Secondary School, London
- Sir Frederick Banting Secondary School, London
- Sir Wilfrid Laurier Secondary School, London
- Strathroy District Collegiate Institute, Strathroy

=== French public ===
- École secondaire Gabriel-Dumont, London

=== English Catholic ===
- Catholic Central High School, London
- Holy Cross Catholic Secondary School, Strathroy
- John Paul II Catholic Secondary School, London
- Mother Teresa Catholic Secondary School, London
- Regina Mundi Catholic College, London
- St. Andre Bessette Catholic Secondary School, London
- St. Thomas Aquinas Catholic Secondary School, London

=== French Catholic ===
- École secondaire catholique Monseigneur-Bruyère, London

== District Municipality of Muskoka ==
=== English public ===
- Bracebridge and Muskoka Lakes Secondary School, Bracebridge
- Gravenhurst High School, Gravenhurst
- Huntsville High School, Huntsville

=== English Catholic ===
- St. Dominic Catholic Secondary School, Bracebridge

=== English private ===
- Dewey Institute, Bracebridge

== Norfolk County ==
=== English public ===
- Delhi District Secondary School, Delhi
- Port Dover Composite School, Port Dover
- Simcoe Composite School, Simcoe
- Valley Heights Secondary School, Walsingham
- Waterford District High School, Waterford

=== English Catholic ===
- Holy Trinity Catholic High School, Simcoe
- Sprucedale Secondary School, Simcoe (for youth held in secure custody at Sprucedale Youth Centre, operated under contract from the Ministry of Children, Community and Social Services)

== Northumberland County ==
=== English public ===
- Campbellford District High School, Campbellford
- Cobourg District Collegiate Institute East, Cobourg
- Cobourg District Collegiate Institute West, Cobourg
- East Northumberland Secondary School, Brighton
- Port Hope High School, Port Hope

=== English Catholic ===
- St. Mary's Secondary School, Cobourg

== Regional Municipality of Niagara ==
=== English public ===
- A. N. Myer Secondary School, Niagara Falls
- Beamsville District Secondary School, Beamsville
- DSBN Academy, St. Catharines
- E. L. Crossley Secondary School, Fonthill
- Eastdale Secondary School, Welland
- Eden High School, St. Catharines
- Governor Simcoe Secondary School, St. Catharines
- Greater Fort Erie Secondary School, Fort Erie
- Laura Secord Secondary School, St. Catharines
- Port Colborne High School, Port Colborne
- St. Catharines Collegiate Secondary School, St. Catharines
- Sir Winston Churchill Secondary School (St. Catharines), St. Catharines
- Stamford Collegiate Secondary School, Niagara Falls
- Thorold Secondary School, Thorold
- Welland Centennial Secondary School, Welland
- West Niagara Secondary School, Beamsville
- Westlane Secondary School, Niagara Falls

=== French public ===
- École secondaire Confédération, Welland

=== English Catholic ===
- Blessed Trinity Catholic Secondary School, Grimsby
- Denis Morris Catholic High School, St. Catharines
- Holy Cross Catholic Secondary School, St. Catharines
- Lakeshore Catholic High School, Port Colborne
- Notre Dame College School, Welland
- St. Francis Catholic Secondary School, St. Catharines
- St. Michael Catholic High School, Niagara Falls
- St. Paul Catholic High School, Niagara Falls

=== French Catholic ===
- École secondaire catholique Saint Jean de Brébeuf, Welland

=== English private ===
- Ridley College, St. Catharines
- Heritage Christian School, Jordan
- Jordan Christian School, Jordan
- Robert Land Academy, Wellandport
- Smithville District Christian High School, Smithville
- Eagles Nest Academy, Port Dalhousie
- Niagara Christian Collegiate, Fort Erie

== Nipissing District ==
=== English public ===
- Chippewa Intermediate & Secondary School, North Bay
- F. J. McElligott Intermediate & Secondary School, Mattawa
- Laurentian Learning Centre, North Bay
- Northern Secondary School, Sturgeon Falls
- West Ferris Intermediate & Secondary School, North Bay
- Widdifield Secondary School, North Bay (closed)

=== French public ===
- École publique l'Odyssée, North Bay
- École secondaire publique Northern, Sturgeon Falls

=== English Catholic ===
- St. Joseph-Scollard Hall Catholic Secondary School, North Bay

=== French Catholic ===
- École secondaire catholique Algonquin, North Bay
- École secondaire catholique Élisabeth-Bruyère, Mattawa
- École secondaire catholique Franco-Cité, Sturgeon Falls

== Ottawa ==
=== English public ===
- A. Y. Jackson Secondary School
- Adult High School
- Bell High School
- Brookfield High School
- Cairine Wilson Secondary School
- Canterbury High School
- Colonel By Secondary School
- Earl of March Secondary School
- Glebe Collegiate Institute
- Gloucester High School
- Hillcrest High School
- John McCrae Secondary School
- Lisgar Collegiate Institute
- Longfields-Davidson Heights Secondary School
- Maplewood Secondary School
- Merivale High School
- Nepean High School
- Osgoode Township High School
- Ottawa Technical Learning Centre
- Ridgemont High School
- Sir Guy Carleton Secondary School
- Sir Robert Borden High School
- Sir Wilfrid Laurier Secondary School
- South Carleton High School
- West Carleton Secondary School
- Woodroffe High School

=== French public ===
- École secondaire publique L'Alternative
- École secondaire publique De La Salle
- École secondaire publique Gisèle-Lalonde
- École secondaire publique Louis-Riel
- École secondaire publique Omer-Deslauriers
- École secondaire publique Pierre-De-Blois
- École élémentaire et secondaire publique Maurice-Lapointe

=== English Catholic ===
- All Saints Catholic High School
- Holy Trinity Catholic High School
- Immaculata High School
- Lester B. Pearson Catholic High School
- M. F. McHugh Education Centre
- Mother Teresa High School
- Notre Dame High School
- Sacred Heart High School
- St. Francis Xavier Catholic High School
- St. Joseph High School
- St. Mark Catholic High School
- St. Matthew High School
- St. Nicholas Adult High School
- St. Patrick's High School
- St. Paul High School
- St. Peter High School
- St. Pius X High School

=== French Catholic ===
- Centre professionel et technique Minto
- Collège catholique Franco-Ouest
- Collège catholique Samuel-Genest
- École secondaire catholique Béatrice-Desloges
- École secondaire catholique Franco-Cité
- École secondaire catholique Garneau
- École secondaire catholique Pierre-Savard

== Oxford County ==
=== English public ===
- Annandale School, Tillsonburg
- College Avenue Secondary School, Woodstock
- Glendale High School, Tillsonburg
- Huron Park Secondary School, Woodstock
- Ingersoll District Collegiate Institute, Ingersoll
- Norwich District High School, Norwich
- Woodstock Collegiate Institute, Woodstock

=== English Catholic ===
- St. Mary's Catholic High School, Woodstock

=== French Catholic ===
- École secondaire catholique Notre-Dame, Woodstock

== Parry Sound District ==
=== English public ===
- Almaguin Highlands Secondary School, South River
- Parry Sound High School, Parry Sound

=== French public ===
- École publique aux Quatre-Vents, Parry Sound

=== English private ===
- Rosseau Lake College, Rosseau

== Regional Municipality of Peel ==
=== English public ===
- Applewood Heights Secondary School, Mississauga
- Bramalea Secondary School, Brampton
- Brampton Centennial Secondary School, Brampton
- Castlebrooke Secondary School, Brampton
- Cawthra Park Secondary School, Mississauga
- Central Peel Secondary School, Brampton
- Chinguacousy Secondary School, Brampton
- Clarkson Secondary School, Mississauga
- David Suzuki Secondary School, Brampton
- Erindale Secondary School, Mississauga
- Fletcher's Meadow Secondary School, Brampton
- Glenforest Secondary School, Mississauga
- Harold M. Brathwaite Secondary School, Brampton
- Heart Lake Secondary School, Brampton
- Humberview Secondary School, Caledon
- Jean Augustine Secondary School, Brampton
- John Fraser Secondary School, Mississauga
- Judith Nyman Secondary School, Brampton
- Lincoln M. Alexander Secondary School, Mississauga
- Lorne Park Secondary School, Mississauga
- Louise Arbour Secondary School, Brampton
- Mayfield Secondary School, Caledon
- Meadowvale Secondary School, Mississauga
- Mississauga Secondary School, Mississauga
- North Park Secondary School, Brampton
- Port Credit Secondary School, Mississauga
- Rick Hansen Secondary School, Mississauga
- Sandalwood Heights Secondary School, Brampton
- Stephen Lewis Secondary School, Mississauga
- Streetsville Secondary School, Mississauga
- Thomas L. Kennedy Secondary School, Mississauga
- Turner Fenton Secondary School, Brampton
- West Credit Secondary School, Mississauga
- The Woodlands School, Mississauga

=== English Catholic ===
- Ascension of Our Lord Secondary School, Mississauga
- Cardinal Ambrozic Secondary School, Brampton
- Cardinal Leger Secondary School, Brampton
- Father Michael Goetz Secondary School, Mississauga
- Holy Name of Mary Secondary School, Brampton
- Iona Catholic Secondary School, Mississauga
- John Cabot Catholic Secondary School, Mississauga
- Loyola Catholic Secondary School, Mississauga
- Notre Dame Catholic Secondary School, Brampton
- Our Lady of Mount Carmel Secondary School, Mississauga
- Philip Pocock Catholic Secondary School, Mississauga
- Robert F. Hall Catholic Secondary School, Caledon
- St. Aloysius Gonzaga Secondary School, Mississauga
- St. Augustine Catholic Secondary School, Brampton
- St. Edmund Campion Secondary School, Brampton
- St. Francis Xavier Secondary School, Mississauga
- St. Joan of Arc Catholic Secondary School, Mississauga
- St. Joseph's Secondary School, Mississauga
- St. Marcellinus Secondary School, Mississauga
- St. Marguerite d'Youville Secondary School, Brampton
- St. Martin Catholic Secondary School, Mississauga
- St. Michael Catholic Secondary School, Bolton
- St. Oscar Romero Catholic Secondary School, Mississauga
- St. Paul Secondary School, Mississauga
- St. Roch Catholic Secondary School, Brampton
- St. Thomas Aquinas Catholic Secondary School, Brampton

=== French public ===
- École secondaire Jeunes sans frontières, Brampton

=== French Catholic ===
- École secondaire catholique Sainte-Famille, Mississauga

=== English private ===
- Bronte College, Mississauga
- Elpis Academy, Mississauga
- Mentor College, Mississauga

== Perth County ==
=== English public ===
- Listowel District Secondary School, Listowel
- Mitchell District High School, Mitchell
- St. Marys District Collegiate & Vocational Institute, St. Marys
- Stratford Central Secondary School, Stratford
- Stratford Northwestern Secondary School, Stratford

=== English Catholic ===
- St. Michael Catholic Secondary School, Stratford

== Peterborough County ==
=== English public ===
- Adam Scott Collegiate and Vocational Institute, Peterborough
- Crestwood Secondary School, Peterborough
- Kenner Collegiate Vocational Institute, Peterborough
- Norwood District High School, Norwood
- Thomas A. Stewart Secondary School, Peterborough

=== English Catholic ===
- Holy Cross Secondary School, Peterborough
- St. Peter's Secondary School, Peterborough

== Prescott and Russell United Counties ==
=== English public ===
- Rockland District High School, Rockland
- Russell High School, Russell
- Vankleek Hill Collegiate Institute, Vankleek Hill

=== French public ===
- École secondaire publique L'Académie de La Seigneurie, Casselman
- École secondaire publique Le Sommet, Hawkesbury

=== English Catholic ===
- St. Francis Xavier Catholic High School, Hammond
- St. Thomas Aquinas Catholic High School, Russell

=== French Catholic ===
- École secondaire catholique de Casselman, Casselman
- École secondaire catholique de Plantagenet, Plantagenet
- École secondaire catholique Embrun, Embrun
- École secondaire catholique L'Escale, Rockland
- École secondaire catholique régionale de Hawkesbury, Hawkesbury

== Prince Edward County ==
=== English public ===
- Prince Edward Collegiate Institute, Picton

== Rainy River District ==
=== English public ===
- Atikokan High School, Atikokan
- Fort Frances High School, Fort Frances
- Rainy River High School, Rainy River

== Renfrew County ==
=== English public ===
- Arnprior District High School, Arnprior
- Fellowes High School, Pembroke
- Valour High School, Petawawa
- Mackenzie High School, Deep River
- Madawaska Valley District High School, Barry's Bay
- Opeongo High School, Douglas
- Renfrew Collegiate Institute, Renfrew

=== French public ===
- École secondaire publique L'Équinoxe, Pembroke

=== English Catholic ===
- Bishop Smith Catholic High School, Pembroke
- St. Joseph's Catholic High School, Renfrew

=== French Catholic ===
- Centre scolaire catholique Jeanne-Lajoie, Pembroke

== Simcoe County ==
=== English public ===
- Banting Memorial High School, Alliston
- Barrie North Collegiate Institute, Barrie
- Bear Creek Secondary School, Barrie
- Bradford District High School, Bradford
- Collingwood Collegiate Institute, Collingwood
- Eastview Secondary School, Barrie
- Elmvale District High School, Elmvale
- Innisdale Secondary School, Barrie
- Georgian Bay District Secondary School, Midland
- Nantyr Shores Secondary School, Alcona
- Nottawasaga Pines Secondary School, Angus
- OD/Park Secondary School, Orillia
- Stayner Collegiate Institute, Stayner
- Twin Lakes Secondary School, Orillia

=== French public ===
- École secondaire Le Caron, Penetanguishene
- Ecole secondaire Roméo Dallaire, Barrie

=== English Catholic ===
- Holy Trinity Catholic High School, Bradford
- Our Lady of the Bay Catholic High School, Collingwood
- Patrick Fogarty School, Orillia
- St. Joan of Arc Catholic High School, Barrie
- St. Joseph's High School, Barrie
- St. Peter's School, Barrie
- St. Theresa's Separate School, Midland
- St. Thomas Aquinas School, Tottenham

=== French Catholic ===
- École secondaire catholique Nouvelle-Alliance, Barrie

== Stormont, Dundas and Glengarry United Counties ==
=== English public ===
- Charlottenburgh and Lancaster District High School, Williamstown
- Cornwall Collegiate and Vocational School, Cornwall
- Glengarry District High School, Alexandria
- North Dundas District High School, Winchester
- Rothwell-Osnabruck Secondary School, Ingleside
- St. Lawrence High School, Cornwall
- Seaway District High School, Iroquois
- Tagwi Secondary School, Avonmore

=== French public ===
- École secondaire publique L'Héritage, Cornwall

=== English Catholic ===
- Holy Trinity Catholic Secondary School, Cornwall
- St. Joseph's Catholic Secondary School, Cornwall
- St. Matthew Catholic Learning Centre, Cornwall

=== French Catholic ===
- École secondaire catholique La Citadelle, Cornwall
- École secondaire catholique Le Relais, Alexandria

== Sudbury District ==
=== English public ===
- Chapleau High School, Chapleau
- Chelmsford Valley District Composite School, Chelmsford
- Confederation Secondary School, Val Caron
- Espanola High School, Espanola
- Lasalle Secondary School, Sudbury
- Lively District Secondary School, Walden
- Lo-Ellen Park Secondary School, Sudbury
- Lockerby Composite School, Sudbury
- M. W. Moore Secondary School, Shining Tree
- Sudbury Secondary School, Sudbury

=== French public ===
- École Cap sur l'Avenir, Sudbury
- École secondaire de la Rivière-des-Français, Noëlville
- École secondaire Hanmer, Hanmer
- École secondaire Macdonald-Cartier, Sudbury

=== English Catholic ===
- Bishop Alexander Carter Catholic Secondary School, Hanmer
- Marymount Academy, Sudbury
- St. Albert Adult Learning Centre, Sudbury
- St. Benedict Catholic Secondary School, Sudbury
- St. Charles College, Sudbury

=== French Catholic ===
- Carrefour Options+, Sudbury
- Collège Notre-Dame, Sudbury
- École secondaire catholique Champlain, Chelmsford
- École secondaire du Sacré-Cœur, Sudbury
- École secondaire catholique Franco-Ouest, Espanola
- École secondaire catholique l'Horizon, Val Caron
- École secondaire catholique Trillium, Chapleau

== Thunder Bay District ==
=== English public ===
- Geraldton Composite High School, Geraldton
- Hammarskjold High School, Thunder Bay
- Lake Superior High School, Terrace Bay
- Manitouwadge High School, Manitouwadge
- Marathon High School, Marathon
- Nipigon-Red Rock District High School, Red Rock
- Superior Collegiate and Vocational Institute, Thunder Bay
- Westgate Collegiate & Vocational Institute, Thunder Bay

=== French public ===
- École secondaire Château-Jeunesse, Longlac
- École secondaire Cité-Supérieure, Marathon
- École secondaire Manitouwadge, Manitouwadge

=== English Catholic ===
- St. Ignatius High School, Thunder Bay
- St. Patrick High School, Thunder Bay

=== First Nations private ===
- Migizi Miigwanan Secondary School

=== French Catholic ===
- École secondaire catholique de la Vérendrye, Thunder Bay

== Timiskaming District ==
=== English public ===
- Englehart High School, Englehart
- Kirkland Lake District Composite School, Kirkland Lake
- Timiskaming District Secondary School, New Liskeard

=== French Catholic ===
- École secondaire catholique l'Envolée du Nord, Kirkland Lake
- École secondaire catholique Sainte-Marie, New Liskeard
- Centre d'éducation des Adultes, New Liskeard

== Toronto ==
=== English public ===
- Avondale Alternative Secondary School (Note: Institution is operated as an alternative school)
- A. Y. Jackson Secondary School
- Agincourt Collegiate Institute
- Albert Campbell Collegiate Institute
- Birchmount Park Collegiate Institute
- Bloor Collegiate Institute
- Burnhamthorpe Collegiate Institute
- C. W. Jefferys Collegiate Institute
- Cedarbrae Collegiate Institute
- Central Etobicoke High School
- Central Technical School
- Central Toronto Academy
- City School
- Danforth Collegiate and Technical Institute
- David and Mary Thomson Collegiate Institute
- Don Mills Collegiate Institute
- Downsview Secondary School
- Dr Norman Bethune Collegiate Institute
- Drewry Secondary School
- Earl Haig Secondary School
- Eastdale Collegiate Institute
- East York Collegiate Institute
- Emery Collegiate Institute
- Etobicoke Collegiate Institute
- Etobicoke School of the Arts
- Forest Hill Collegiate Institute
- George Harvey Collegiate Institute
- George S. Henry Academy
- Georges Vanier Secondary School
- Greenwood Secondary School
- Harbord Collegiate Institute
- Humberside Collegiate Institute
- Inglenook Community High School
- Jarvis Collegiate Institute
- John Polanyi Collegiate Institute
- Kipling Collegiate Institute
- L'Amoreaux Collegiate Institute
- Lakeshore Collegiate Institute
- Lawrence Park Collegiate Institute
- Leaside High School
- Lester B. Pearson Collegiate Institute
- Malvern Collegiate Institute
- Marc Garneau Collegiate Institute
- Martingrove Collegiate Institute
- Monarch Park Collegiate Institute
- Newtonbrook Secondary School
- North Albion Collegiate Institute
- North Toronto Collegiate Institute
- Northern Secondary School
- Northview Heights Secondary School
- Oakwood Collegiate Institute
- Parkdale Collegiate Institute
- R. H. King Academy
- Richview Collegiate Institute
- Riverdale Collegiate Institute
- Rosedale Heights School of the Arts
- Runnymede Collegiate Institute
- School of Experiential Education
- SEED Alternative School
- Silverthorn Collegiate Institute
- Sir John A. Macdonald Collegiate Institute
- Sir Oliver Mowat Collegiate Institute
- Sir Wilfrid Laurier Collegiate Institute
- Sir William Osler High School
- Stephen Leacock Collegiate Institute
- Subway Academy I
- Subway Academy II
- The Student School
- Thistletown Collegiate Institute
- Ursula Franklin Academy
- Victoria Park Collegiate Institute
- W. A. Porter Collegiate Institute
- West Hill Collegiate Institute
- West Humber Collegiate Institute
- Western Technical-Commercial School
- Weston Collegiate Institute
- Westview Centennial Secondary School
- Wexford Collegiate School for the Arts
- William Lyon Mackenzie Collegiate Institute
- Winston Churchill Collegiate Institute
- Woburn Collegiate Institute
- York Humber High School
- York Memorial Collegiate Institute
- York Mills Collegiate Institute

=== English Catholic ===
- Alternative Pupil Placement for Limited Expelled Students
- Bishop Allen Academy
- Bishop Marrocco/Thomas Merton Catholic Secondary School
- Brebeuf College School
- Cardinal Carter Academy for the Arts (Note: Institution operates as a "combined institution", providing some elementary levels of schooling in addition to secondary education.)
- Chaminade College School
- Dante Alighieri Academy
- Father Henry Carr Catholic Secondary School
- Father John Redmond Catholic Secondary School and Regional Arts Centre
- Francis Libermann Catholic High School
- James Cardinal McGuigan Catholic High School
- Loretto College School
- Loretto Abbey Catholic Secondary School
- Madonna Catholic Secondary School
- Marshall McLuhan Catholic Secondary School
- Mary Ward Catholic Secondary School
- Michael Power/St. Joseph High School
- Monsignor Fraser College
- Monsignor Percy Johnson Catholic High School
- Neil McNeil High School
- Notre Dame High School
- Senator O'Connor College School
- St. Basil-the-Great College School
- St. Joan of Arc Catholic Academy
- St. John Henry Newman Catholic High School
- St. John Paul II Catholic Secondary School
- St. Joseph's College School
- St. Joseph's Morrow Park Catholic Secondary School
- St. Mary Catholic Academy
- St. Michael's Choir School
- St. Mother Teresa Catholic Academy
- St. Oscar Romero Catholic Secondary School
- St. Patrick Catholic Secondary School

=== French public ===
- École secondaire Étienne-Brûlé
- École secondaire Toronto Ouest
- Le Collège français

=== French Catholic ===
- École secondaire catholique Monseigneur-de-Charbonnel
- École secondaire catholique Père-Philippe-Lamarche
- École secondaire catholique Saint-Frère-André

=== Independent ===
- Bayview Glen School
- Bishop Strachan School
- Branksome Hall
- Crescent School
- Crestwood Preparatory College
- De La Salle College
- Elpis Academy
- Greenwood College School
- Havergal College
- Hawthorn School for Girls
- North Toronto Christian School
- Royal St. George's College
- St. Clement's School
- St. Michael's College School
- Toronto French School
- University of Toronto Schools
- Upper Canada College
- Tanenbaum Community Hebrew Academy of Toronto
- York School
- Z3 Education Centre

== Regional Municipality of Waterloo ==
=== English public ===
- Bluevale Collegiate Institute, Waterloo
- Cameron Heights Collegiate Institute, Kitchener
- Eastwood Collegiate Institute, Kitchener
- Elmira District Secondary School, Elmira
- Forest Heights Collegiate Institute, Kitchener
- Galt Collegiate Institute and Vocational School, Cambridge
- Glenview Park Secondary School, Cambridge
- Grand River Collegiate Institute, Kitchener
- Huron Heights Secondary School, Kitchener
- Jacob Hespeler Secondary School, Cambridge
- Kitchener-Waterloo Collegiate and Vocational School (KCI), Kitchener
- Preston High School, Cambridge
- Sir John A. Macdonald Secondary School, Waterloo
- Southwood Secondary School, Cambridge
- Waterloo Collegiate Institute, Waterloo
- Waterloo-Oxford District Secondary School, Baden

=== English Catholic ===
- Monsignor Doyle Catholic Secondary School, Cambridge
- Resurrection Catholic Secondary School, Kitchener
- St. Benedict Catholic Secondary School, Cambridge
- St. David Catholic Secondary School, Waterloo
- St. Louis Adult & Continuing Education, Cambridge and Kitchener
- St. Mary's High School, Kitchener

=== French Catholic ===
- École secondaire Père-René-de-Galinée, Cambridge

=== Private Schools ===
- Rockway Mennonite Collegiate, Kitchener
- Scholars' Hall University Preparatory School, Kitchener
- St. Jude's Special Education Day School, Kitchener
- St. John's-Kilmarnock School, Breslau
- Our Lady of Mount Carmel Academy, New Hamburg
- Woodland Christian High School, Breseau

== Wellington County ==
=== English public ===
- Centennial Collegiate Vocational Institute, Guelph
- Centre Wellington District High School, Fergus
- College Heights Secondary School, Guelph
- Erin District High School, Erin
- Guelph Collegiate Vocational Institute, Guelph
- John F. Ross Collegiate Vocational Institute, Guelph
- Norwell District Secondary School, Palmerston
- Wellington Heights Secondary School, Mount Forest

=== English Catholic ===
- Bishop Macdonell Catholic High School, Guelph
- Our Lady of Lourdes Catholic High School, Guelph
- St. James Catholic High School, Guelph

== Regional Municipality of York ==
=== English public ===
- ACCESS Georgina District High School, Georgina
- ACCESS Program Jefferson Community Learning Centre, Richmond Hill
- Alexander Mackenzie High School, Richmond Hill
- Aurora High School, Aurora
- Bayview Secondary School, Richmond Hill
- Bill Crothers Secondary School, Markham
- Bill Hogarth Secondary School, Markham
- Bur Oak Secondary School, Markham
- Dr. G.W. Williams Secondary School, Aurora
- Dr. John M. Denison Secondary School, Newmarket
- Emily Carr Secondary School, Vaughan
- Hodan Nalayeh Secondary School, Vaughan (formerly Vaughan Secondary School)
- Huron Heights Secondary School, Newmarket
- Keswick High School, Keswick
- King City Secondary School, King City
- Langstaff Secondary School, Richmond Hill
- Maple High School, Vaughan
- Markham District High School, Markham
- Markville Secondary School, Markham
- Middlefield Collegiate Institute, Markham
- Milliken Mills High School, Markham
- Newmarket High School, Newmarket
- Pierre Elliott Trudeau High School, Markham
- Richmond Green Secondary School, Richmond Hill
- Richmond Hill Adult Community Learning School, Richmond Hill
- Richmond Hill High School, Richmond Hill
- Sir William Mulock Secondary School, Newmarket
- Stephen Lewis Secondary School, Vaughan
- Stouffville District Secondary School, Stouffville
- Sutton District High School, Sutton
- Thornhill Secondary School, Thornhill
- Thornlea Secondary School, Thornhill
- Tommy Douglas Secondary School, Vaughan
- Unionville High School, Markham
- Westmount Collegiate Institute, Vaughan
- Woodbridge College, Vaughan

=== English Catholic ===
- Cardinal Carter Catholic High School, Aurora
- Father Bressani Catholic High School, Woodbridge
- Father Michael McGivney Catholic Academy, Markham
- Holy Cross Catholic Academy, Woodbridge
- Our Lady of the Lake Catholic College School, Keswick
- Our Lady Queen of the World Catholic Academy, Richmond Hill
- Sacred Heart Catholic High School, Newmarket
- St. Augustine Catholic High School, Markham
- St. Brother André Catholic High School, Markham
- St. Elizabeth Catholic High School, Thornhill
- St. Jean de Brebeuf Catholic High School, Woodbridge
- St. Joan of Arc Catholic High School, Maple
- St. Luke Catholic Learning Centre, Thornhill
- St. Maximillian Kolbe Catholic High School, Aurora
- St. Robert Catholic High School, Thornhill
- St. Theresa of Lisieux Catholic High School, Richmond Hill

=== French Catholic ===
- École catholique Pape-François, Whitchurch-Stouffville (Note: Institution operates as a combined elementary and secondary institution.)
- École secondaire catholique Renaissance, Aurora

=== French public ===
- École secondaire Norval-Morrisseau, Richmond Hill

=== Independent ===
- Pickering College, Newmarket
- St. Andrew's College, Aurora
- Villanova College (Canada), Richmond Hill
- The Country Day School, King City

== See also ==
- List of school districts in Ontario
- Cantab College, (1934-?) possibly defunct
