= GDHS =

GDHS may refer to:

- Georgetown District High School, Georgetown, Ontario, Canada
- Glengarry District High School, Alexandria, Ontario, Canada
- Groton-Dunstable Regional High School, Groton, Massachusetts, United States
