= Louise Arbour Secondary School =

Coordinates: 43.760°N 79.767°W

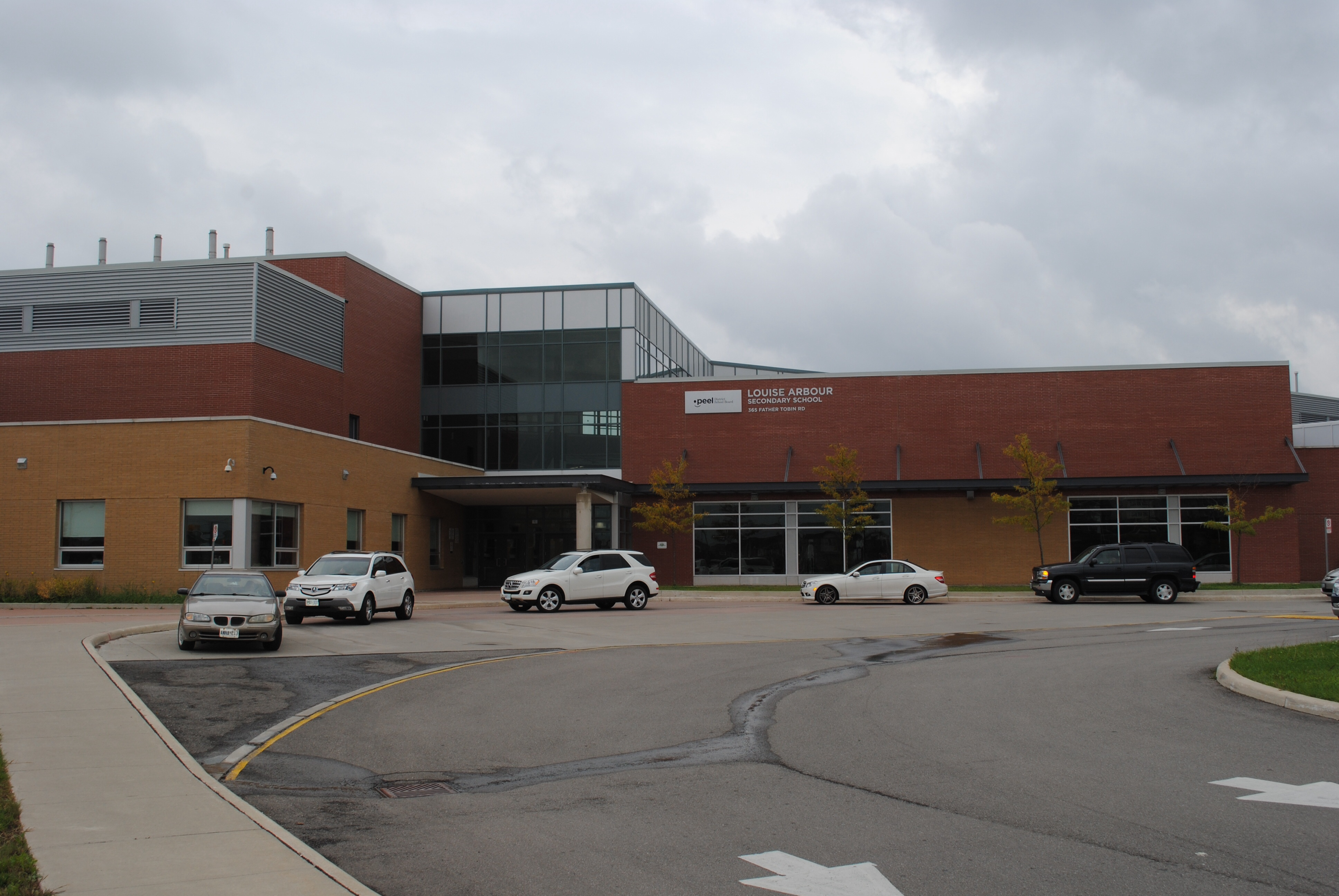

Location
- 365 Father Tobin Road; Brampton, Ontario, L6R0R4; Canada

Information
- School type: Public High School
- Motto: Soaring for Success
- Founded: 2010
- School board: Peel District School Board
- Area trustee: Balbir Sohi
- President: Gurbinder Sandhu
- Principal: Jagtar Singh
- Grades: 9-12
- Enrolment: 1378 (January 2019)
- Language: English,
- Colours: Green and White
- Mascot: Eagle
- Team name: Louise Arbour Eagles
- Website: louisearbour.peelschools.org
- Last updated: January, 2019

Louise Arbour Secondary School is a high school located in Brampton, Ontario, operating under the Peel District School Board. It was established in 2010 to accommodate those who live in north Brampton between Sandalwood Heights Secondary School and Mayfield Secondary School. The school offers programs in all curricular areas along with Specialist High Skills Major programs in Arts and Culture as well as Hospitality and Tourism. Science, mathematics and technology are particular focus areas in the school.

== History ==
The school is named for Louise Arbour, the Governor General of Canada and former justice of the Supreme Court of Canada and UN High Commissioner for Human Rights.

== See also ==
- Education in Ontario
- List of secondary schools in Ontario
