= FMSS =

FMSS may refer to:

- Fairfield Methodist School (Secondary), a co-educational Methodist secondary school in Dover, Singapore
- Fletcher's Meadow Secondary School, a high school in Brampton, Ontario, Canada
