= Streetsville Secondary School =

Coordinates: 43.579835°N 79.718862°W

Location
- 72 Joymar Drive; Mississauga, Ontario, L5M 1G3; Canada

Information
- School type: Public High school
- Motto: Esse Quam Videri (To Be Rather than to Seem)
- Founded: 1958
- School board: Peel District School Board
- Superintendent: Leslie Grant
- Area trustee: Jill Promoli; Evelyn Lee (Student Trustee for schools South of Hwy 401)
- School number: 945978
- Administrator: Amal Attallah
- Principal: Patricia Whyte
- Staff: 98
- Grades: 9-12
- Enrolment: 947 (June 2023)
- Language: English, French immersion
- Colours: Orange and black
- Mascot: Tiger
- Team name: Streetsville Tigers
- Website: streetsvillesecondary.com

Streetsville Secondary School is a high school in the Peel District School Board located in the Streetsville Village community of Mississauga, Ontario, Canada.

== Description and history ==
Streetsville Secondary School was opened in 1958. The school currently has approximately 900+ students enrolled, with about half enrolled in the French Immersion program.

The school features a main floor and a second floor on its north side which consists of mostly English, Math, Geography and history classes. It has two gymnasiums, one large in size, and the second being half the size of the first. When the school first opened, the smaller gym was originally intended to be a swimming pool. The school also has a library, which was renovated and expanded, a weight room, and a cafeteria.

The school has several unusual classes including Grade 11 and 12 Photographic Arts, the unusual aspect being the darkroom available for student use, one of the last remaining in the Peel school system. Also available to students is Music Production, a course teaching the recording and mastering of music using computers.

In 2005, the French immersion programme for students was introduced at Streetsville Secondary School where students can learn bilingualism in Canada. The courses offered are: French Immersion (Grades 9-12), Science, and Geography of Canada (Grade 9), Contemporary Canadian History, Career Studies, and Civics (Grade 10), World History to the 16th Century (Grade 11), and Canadian and World Issues: A Geographic Analysis (Grade 12).

Up until the summer of 2005, the school had 13 portable buildings. However, in 2005, Mississauga Secondary School opened in the area and about half of the grade 9 and 10 students attending Streetsville had to switch schools due to boundary changes. This dropped the overall attendance by about 500, and all of the portables except one were removed. The sole portable remaining was used as an extension of the school's drama room until it was removed in 2006 due to budget cuts.

A $7 million renovation/expansion during the summer of 2015 and the 2015–16 school year included a 6-classroom extension and an elevator.

== Sports ==
Streetsville Secondary School offers many athletic opportunities, including: rugby, basketball, volleyball, track and field, hockey, swimming, badminton, flag football, and rugby sevens. Streetsville has won Senior Boys ROPSSAA (Region of Peel Secondary Schools Athletic Association) Gold Medal in Rugby, as well as an OFSAA Gold Medal, finishing their 2012 season with 32 wins and 0 losses. The school also has an archery team that does exceptionally well each year winning many Olympic class Gold, Silver and Bronze Medals in ROPSSAA and OFSAA. Also, in 2021 the Senior Boys Volleyball team went 0-4 in OFSAA located in North Bay.

Streetsville won its only hockey championship in 2005, coming from behind in both the semi-final and final. The win is still one of the most celebrated events at school reunions.

The junior girls rugby team maintained an 8 game winning streak in the 2022 15s season. They finished 1st at ROPSSAA, defeating St. Francis Xavier 31-0 in the final.

== Notable students and alumni ==
- Ibrahim Aboud - terror-plot convict
- Morag Smith - comedian
- Zaib Shaikh City of Toronto Film Commissioner and Director of Entertainment Industries, actor, writer and director.
- Natalie Wideman Olympic Softball Player.

== See also ==
- Education in Ontario
- List of secondary schools in Ontario
