= St. Kateri Tekakwitha Catholic Secondary School =

Location
- 1125 Kennedy Circle; Milton, Ontario, L9T 5S5; Canada; 43.5007°N 79.8337°W

Information
- School type: Secondary School
- Religious affiliation: Roman Catholic
- Founded: 2021
- School board: Halton Catholic District School Board
- Principal: Kevin Wong
- Grades: Grades 9 to 12
- Language: English
- Website: secondary.hcdsb.org/stkateri/

St. Kateri Tekakwitha Catholic Secondary School is a public Catholic secondary school located in Milton, Ontario, Canada. St. Kateri Tekakwitha is a part of the Halton Catholic District School Board. It opened in September 2021. It is named after Kateri Tekakwitha, a Catholic saint.

The school hopes to offer the International Baccalaureate program beginning in 2026.

== See also ==
- Education in Ontario
- List of secondary schools in Ontario
