= West Credit Secondary School =

Location
- 6325 Montevideo Road; Mississauga, Ontario, L5N 4G7; Canada; 43.5858°N 79.7468°W

Information
- School type: Provincial, High school
- Founded: June 1, 1986 40 years ago
- School board: Peel District School Board
- Superintendent: Nina Jaiswal
- Area trustee: Janet McDougald; Brad MacDonald; Sue Lawton; Rick Williams; Robert Crocker; Nokha Dakroub
- Principal: Stephen Koziarski
- Grades: 9-12
- Enrolment: 500
- Language: English
- Colours: Silver and Blue
- Mascot: The Panther
- Team name: Panthers
- Website: westcredit.peelschools.org

West Credit Secondary School is a high school in Mississauga, Ontario, Canada. It is a workplace or college destination for the Peel District School Board. Its cousin school, Judith Nyman Secondary School is a high school in Brampton, Ontario, Canada that offers similar trades courses. West Credit and Judith Nyman are currently the only two vocational schools in the Peel District School Board and offer students more choices in trades courses than most other Peel high schools. West Credit S.S. is aimed at students who want to pursue a career in the trades, or sometimes it is recommended for those with an Individual Education Plan (IEP) at the vocational 1. Both high schools offer vocational and applied level courses. Students can participate in programs leading to apprenticeship and can work towards their required apprenticeship courses and training upon completing their Ontario Secondary School Diplomas.

West Credit also offers an Applied Skilled Trades program and a Doggy Daycare co-op program.

== See also ==
- Education in Ontario
- List of secondary schools in Ontario
