= Brampton Christian School =

Location
- 12480 Hutchinson Farm Lane; Caledon, Ontario, L7C 2B6; Canada; 43°44′32″N 79°50′21″W

Information
- School type: independent elementary school and high school
- Religious affiliations: Pentecostal Assemblies of Canada; Association of Christian Schools International
- Founded: 1977
- School number: 889814
- Principal: A. Cabral
- Grades: JK-12
- Enrollment: 505 (September 2009)
- Language: English
- Colours: Black, white, burgundy, and grey
- Mascot: Bobcat
- Website: www.bramptoncs.org

Brampton Christian School, formerly Kennedy Road Tabernacle Christian School, founded in 1977, is an independent, interdenominational Christian school in Caledon, Ontario, Canada. It is owned by Kennedy Road Tabernacle.

== Arts ==
The school's music department has one Academy Band. It also has a vocal ensemble that performs at concerts and other events.

== Athletics ==
The high school's team is called the BCS Bobcats. There are teams for badminton, basketball, cross-country, soccer, track and field, volleyball, and flag football. The teams participate in Ontario Federation of School Athletic Associations, Region of Peel Secondary Schools Athletic Association, and Ontario Christian Secondary Schools Athletic Association tournaments.
