= École Publique Renaissance =

École publique Renaissance

Location
- 301 Shirley Street; Timmins, Ontario, P4R 1N5; Canada
- Coordinates: 48.47861°N 81.37936°W

Information
- School type: Public
- Motto: Ta route… ta réussite ! (Your path... Your success!)
- School board: Conseil scolaire de district du Nord-Est de l'Ontario
- Principal: Chantal Tremblay
- Grades: 7-12
- Enrolment: Estimated, 200
- Language: French
- Colours: Black, White, Teal and Purple
- Mascot: Jaguar
- Team name: Renaissance Jags
- Website: renaissance.cspne.ca

École publique Renaissance is a French-language public middle school and high school in Timmins, Ontario, Canada, for grades 7 to 12. It consists of two sections, École Publique Pavillon Renaissance, for grades 7&8, and École secondaire publique Renaissance, for grades 9 to 12. It is administered by the Conseil scolaire de district du Nord-Est de l'Ontario, and is open to all students from Timmins and its surrounding area.

== See also ==
- Education in Ontario
- List of secondary schools in Ontario
