= Elpis Academy =

Elpis Global Education Inc.

Location
- 250 Wyecroft Rd. Unit 9, Oakville, Canada; Oakville, Ontario, L6K 3T7; Canada; 43°26′40″N 79°41′45″W

Information
- School type: private school
- Religious affiliation: none
- Founded: 2003
- Principal: David Kim
- Grades: 1-12
- Enrollment: 80 (September 2008)
- Language: English
- Website: www.elpisglobaledu.ca

Elpis Global Education Inc. is a company that operates Elpis Academy (a learning centre) and Elpis College (a private high school).

== Elpis College ==
Elpis College is an accredited private school in the Province of Ontario since 2007 and offers credit courses based on the Ontario Ministry of Education curriculum. The school has two campuses: Mississauga Campus (BSID #881900) and North York Campus (BSID #884452).

== Administrative Staff ==
- David Kim, PhD, Principal
- Esther Kim, Counsellor
- Christine Hernandez, Counsellor and Administrative Assistant

== Competitions ==
Students from the organization have participated and earned placements in national math competitions run by the Centre for Education in Mathematics and Computing and science competitions.

== See also ==
- Education in Ontario
- List of secondary schools in Ontario
