= Ibrahim Aboud =

Canadian arrestee

- Born: 1987 (age 37–38)

Ibrahim Alkhalel Mohammed Aboud (born 1987) was the 18th person arrested in the 2006 Toronto terrorism plot, on August 3, two months after the other 17 suspects.

Nineteen years old at the time of the arrest, he attended Streetsville Secondary School and lived with his parents and two younger brothers on Falconer Drive in Mississauga, Ontario. He was described as a loner, while his brothers were thought to be "troublemakers".

Represented by Anser Farooq, he was released on $145,000 bail (equivalent to $208,795 in 2023) (Note: also reported as $130,000 (equivalent to $187,195 in 2023)) by a Brampton Justice of the Peace on August 25, and must live with his parents. At the time, he was enrolled at Ryerson University.
