= Lincoln M. Alexander Secondary School =

Location
- 3545 Morning Star Drive; Mississauga, Ontario, L4T 1Y3; Canada; 43.7244°N 79.6401°W

Information
- School type: Public high school
- Founded: 1968 as Westwood Secondary School
- School board: Peel District School Board
- Superintendent: Harjit Aujla
- Area trustee: Carrie Andrews and Susan Benjamin
- School number: 952885
- Principal: Devon Hanson
- Grades: 9-12+
- Enrolment: 922 (May 2022)
- Language: English
- Colours: Blue and Silver
- Mascot: Lynx
- Team name: Lynx
- Website: lincolnmalexanderss.peelschools.org

Lincoln M. Alexander Secondary School is located in the village of Malton in the city of Mississauga, Ontario (part of the Peel District School Board). It is named after the former federal cabinet minister and Lieutenant Governor of Ontario, Lincoln M. Alexander. Founded in 1968 as Westwood Secondary School, it was renamed in 2000 after it merged with Morning Star Secondary School.

After the merger the school was expanded, creating the present day Geography/Historical Studies wing. This was done in an effort to accommodate more students.

The exterior of the school is architecturally almost an exact copy of Erindale Secondary School, while their interiors remain different.

The high school is located on Morning Star Drive near the intersection of Morning Star Drive and Goreway Drive. Its location is central to the small community of Malton. As a result, it is not serviced by school buses except for disabled people. Adjacent to the high school is Malton Community Centre with its facilities such as a library. Behind the secondary school, there is the Jonathan Davis Youth Hub facility open for youth and students at Lincoln and across Malton

== See also ==
- Education in Ontario
- List of secondary schools in Ontario
