= Chinguacousy Secondary School =

Location
- 1370 Williams Parkway; Brampton, Ontario, L6S 1V3; Canada; 43.7375°N 79.7270°W

Information
- School type: Public, High school
- Founded: 1972
- School board: Peel District School Board
- Superintendent: Ozma Masood
- Area trustee: Karla Bailey (Wards 7 & 8)
- School code: 2422
- Director: Rashmi Swarup
- Principal: Loi Lam
- Grades: 9-12
- Enrolment: 1268 (2024)
  - Grade 9: 322
  - Grade 10: 323
  - Grade 11: 324
  - Grade 12: 299
- Average class size: 28+ Students
- Language: English, Core French
- Schedule: 8AM- 2:34PM
- Colors: Dark red, and Green
- Slogan: Belong With Purpose, Succeed With Support, Excel In Character
- Mascot: Timberwolves
- Team name: Chinguacousy Timberwolves, ChingDECA, ChingRobotics, etc.
- Feeder schools: Jefferson Public School Grenoble Public School Goldcrest Public School Greenbriar Middle School
- Website: chinguacousy.peelschools.org

Chinguacousy Secondary School /tʃɪŋˈkuːzi/ founded in 1972, is a high school located in Brampton, Ontario, Canada. Since 2000, the school's enrolment has expanded with the development of the surrounding area. The school sports teams and athletic programs have won a number of OFSAA championships; wrestling (1991, 1992, 1993, 1995), curling (1996, 1998), and rugby (1982). Chinguacousy became competitive in basketball and has won several titles since 2000. Chinguacousy currently has a SciTech Program running. From 1972-2016, the mascot was Chinguacousy Chiefs. In June 2016, the school changed its logo and school mascot to the Chinguacousy Timberwolves after a call to indigenous and aboriginal inclusiveness from the Peel District School Board.

== Robotics ==
Chinguacousy Robotics is a robotics club at the school. They participate in the FIRST Robotics Competition (FRC) and VEX Robotics. The team won the VEX Robotics World Championship in 2014.

Chinguacousy also had success in the late 1990s in robotics, competing in the CanadaFIRST National Robotics Championships, earning 4th in 1997, 2nd in 1999, and winning the national championship in 1998. They were mentored by engineers from SPAR Aerospace.

== Notable alumni ==
- Karl Ludwig, former Paralympic athlete, 2014 Olympic bronze medallist
- Raj Grewal, politician
- Zarqa Nawaz, writer and filmmaker
- Russell Peters, stand-up comedian (grades 9–10)
- Alyssa Reid, singer and songwriter
- Alisha Tatham, Olympic athlete and professional basketball player
- Tamara Tatham, Member of Canadian Women's basketball team, Olympic athlete
- Darryl Hinds, Canadian actor and sketch comedian
- WondaGurl, Canadian producer and songwriter.

== See also ==
- Education in Ontario
- List of secondary schools in Ontario
