= Heart Lake Secondary School =

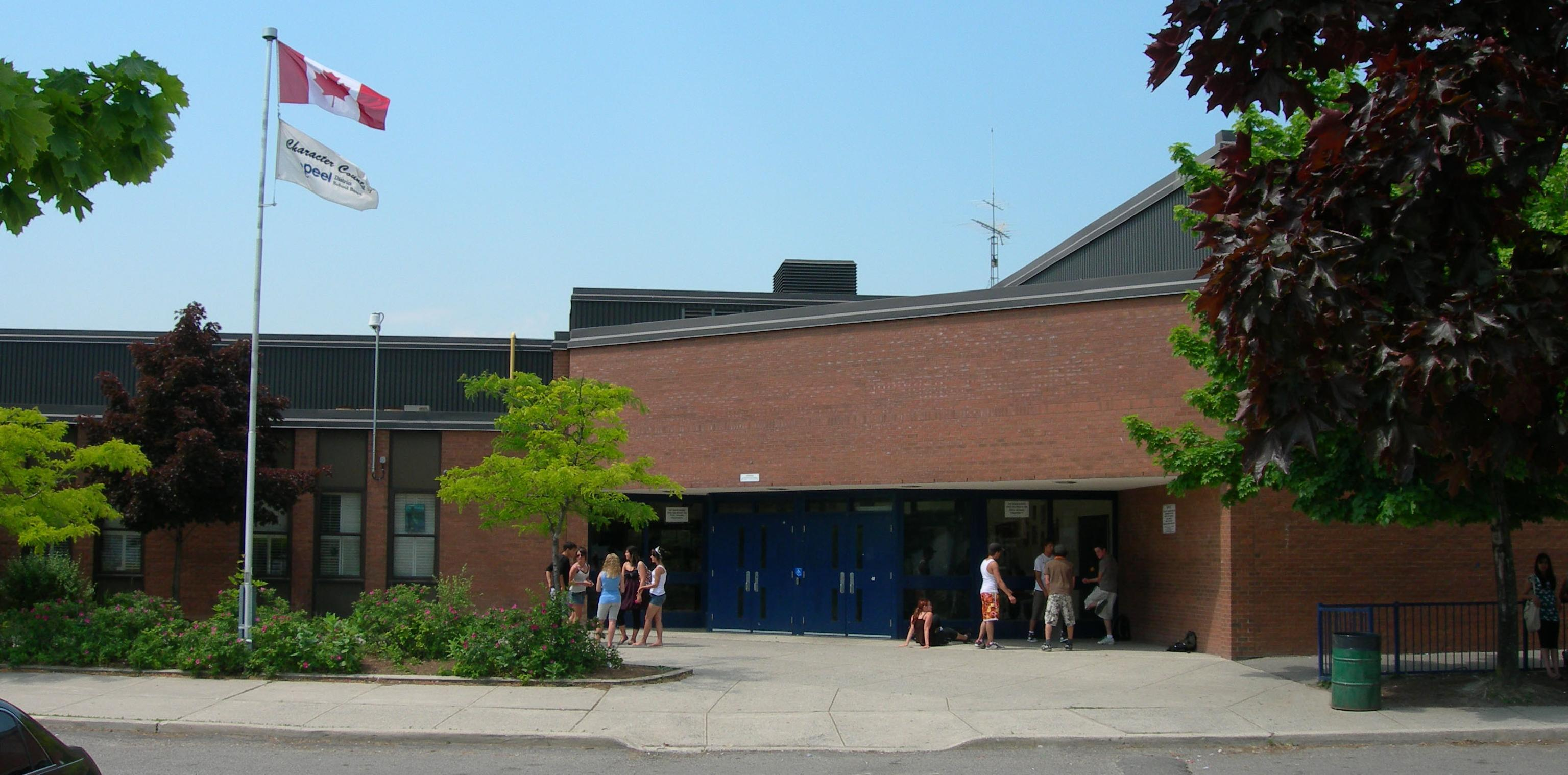
- Front entrance to school

Location
- 296 Conestoga Drive. Brampton, Ontario, L6Z 3M1; Canada; 43.7166°N 79.7888°W

Information
- School type: Provincial, High school
- Motto: Strong Hearts. Bright Minds. Be the best we can.
- Founded: 1988
- School board: Peel District School Board
- Superintendent: Matthew McCutcheon
- Area trustee: Valerie Arnold-Judge; David Green; Steve Kavanagh; Suzanne Nurse
- School number: 916269
- Principal: Carol Ann Mascherin
- Grades: 9-12+
- Enrolment: 1262 (September 2023)
- Language: English
- Colours: Blue, red and white
- Team name: Hurricanes
- Website: www.heartlakess.ca

Heart Lake Secondary School, commonly known as HLSS or Heart Lake, is a public secondary school in Brampton, Ontario, Canada. It is located along Conestoga Drive to the north of Wexford Road, and is named after the Heart Lake neighborhood of Brampton it resides in (which is named after the namesake lake located in nearby Heart Lake Conservation Area). The school was founded in 1988 and is a part of the Peel District School Board. The school has 1150 students enrolled as of September 2019. The school

Heart Lake has two SHSM programs: Arts & Culture and Information & Communication technology,.

== Murder of Eric Levack ==
In 2003, grade nine student Eric Levack, 14, was murdered in the wooded area behind the school during lunch break. The perpetrator was classmate Justin Morton, also 14. Morton pleaded guilty to first degree murder and in 2004 was sentenced as an adult to life in prison, with no eligibility of parole for seven years. Morton was the first person in Canada charged with first degree murder under the newly enacted Youth Criminal Justice Act, which came into force on April 1, 2003, the day of the murder. Morton anonymously appeared in the 2007 documentary film In the Shadow of Feeling, which focused on psychopathic personalities, and spoke about the murder. A lilac tree, planted in memory of Levack, stands on the lawn in front of Heart Lake Secondary School.

== Notable alumni ==
- Michael Bailey, CFL lineman and tackle
- Michael Cera, actor
- Khamica Bingham

== See also ==
- Education in Ontario
- List of secondary schools in Ontario
