= Cantab College =

Cantab College was founded in 1934 and led by L.S.N. Hoare, M.A. (Cambridge) in Toronto, Ontario, Canada. Its name is likely derived from the Latin name of the University of Cambridge, Universitas Cantabrigiensis, often abbreviated to Cantab.
