= Ascension of Our Lord Secondary School =

Location
- 7640 Anaka Drive; Mississauga, Ontario, L4T 3H7; Canada; 43.723°N 79.653°W

Information
- School type: Catholic High School
- Motto: Veni, Sequere Me - Come, Follow Me
- Religious affiliation: Roman Catholic
- Founded: 1976
- School board: Dufferin-Peel Catholic District School Board
- Grades: 9 to 12
- Enrolment: 756 (As of September 28, 2010)
- Language: English
- Campus: Suburban
- Area: Mississauga
- Colours: Yellow and Blue
- Mascot: Eagle
- Team name: Eagles
- Website: www.dpcdsb.org/ASCEN

Ascension of Our Lord Secondary School is a school in the city of Mississauga, in Ontario, Canada.

It is part of the Dufferin-Peel Board. It was originally established as a Middle School (Junior High School), but was converted to a Secondary School (High School) in the 1980s. In 2005 the original building was demolished and a new larger structure was built. The facility was opened to students in January 2006.

In 2012, the Fraser Institute named Ascension as one of Ontario's fastest improving schools. Although a Catholic school, it is open to students from all religious backgrounds.

== History ==
The school opened in 1977. Originally it was a middle school. After 1984, when the Province of Ontario decided that Catholic secondary schools were to be fully funded, the school expanded into high school grades up to grade 13. The original school building was demolished in 2005. In January 2006 the current school building opened. The school now goes up to grade 12 and has a program that allows those that need it to stay in the school beyond grade 12.

== Funding ==
Many complaints have been made by students as well as news sites that the school has not received adequate funding from the school board due to the "socio-economic profile the area is under". Even Parish stated that neglect by the school board is visible.

Construction has not started as of yet (2024) but an email states that funds will be put towards the construction of an artificial turf soccer field, four-lane oval, and long jump pit at Anaka Park. The park is adjacent to Ascension Of Our Lord Catholic Secondary School.

== Notable students ==
- Carlton Chambers - 1996 Olympic gold medalist in 4 × 100 m relay
- George Stroumboulopoulos - media personality
- A.J. Mandani - former international professional basketball player
- Anthony Nalli - executive television producer, drummer of Wicked Truth

== See also ==
- Education in Ontario
- List of secondary schools in Ontario
