= Mayfield Secondary School =

Location
- 5000 Mayfield Road; Caledon, Ontario, L7C 0Z5; Canada; 43.7741°N 79.7821°W

Information
- School type: High school
- Motto: To strive, to seek, to find
- Founded: 1969
- School board: Peel District School Board
- Superintendent: Joy Uniac
- Area trustee: Stan Cameron
- School number: 925349
- Principal: Paul Freier
- Grades: 9-12
- Enrolment: 1865 (2024–25)
- Language: English
- Colours: Gold and Blue
- Mascot: Marvin
- Nickname: Mavs
- Team name: Mayfield Mavericks
- Newspaper: Mayfield Monthly
- Feeder schools: Alloa Public School, Alton Public School, Belfountain Public School, Caledon Central Public School, Herb Campbell Public School, James Grieve Public School, SouthFields Village Public School, Tony Pontes Public School.
- Website: mayfield.peelschools.org

Mayfield Secondary School is located in Caledon, Ontario, Canada. It is one of the Regional Arts Schools in the Peel District School Board. The school offers many programs in all curricular areas, including 2 Specialist High School Major programs in Aviation and Business. As the school is a Regional Arts School, it also offers the Regional Arts Program to students north of the 401 that are interested in the arts. The program covers 4 areas, Dance, Drama, Music, and Visual Arts.

== Controversies ==
=== 2013 Blackface Incident ===
In November 2013, a photo surfaced showing the school’s then vice-principal, Lionel Klotz, dressed in blackface as the television character Mr. T during a Halloween event at the school. This incident prompted concern, and following an investigation of the incident, Klotz was transferred to Humberview Secondary School as a vice-principal in January 2014.

== Transportation ==
Bus transportation to and from the school is provided to all students who live more than a radius of 3.8km (2.4 mi) from the building. Brampton Transit also serves the school with several routes connecting to the Heart Lake and Bramalea terminals.

== Notable alumni ==
- Larnell Lewis, Drummer
- Kyle Quincey, NHL Defenceman
- Megan Bonnell, folk musician
- Clifton Brown, Muay Thai Kickboxer (Grade 9)
- Lara Jean Chorostecki, actor
- Ashley Comeau, actor/Second City alumna/television writer/producer
- Paulo Costanzo, actor
- Director X, music video director Julien Lutz
- Jordan Gavaris, actor
- Michaela Hinds, World Champion Irish dancer
- Jake Holden, Olympic snowboarder
- Kris Lemche, actor
- Nicholas Lindsay, MLS soccer player (Toronto FC)
- Mico (singer), musician
- Jayden Nelson professional soccer player
- Brittany Raymond, actress and dancer, on The Next Step
- Tess Routliffe, Paralympic swimmer
- Kyle Seeback, former MP, Brampton West
- Skye Sweetnam, musician
- Brittany Webster, cross-country skier
- Ian Williams, Giller Prize-winning author
- Dave Greszczyszyn, Skeleton Olympian
- Brandie Wilkerson, Beach Volleyball Olympian
- Zoey Williams, Air Canada First Officer

== See also ==
- Education in Ontario
- List of secondary schools in Ontario
