= David Suzuki Secondary School =

Location
- 45 Daviselm Drive; Brampton, Ontario, L6X 0Z3; Canada; 43.6678°N 79.7855°W

Information
- School type: High school
- Motto: Be the change
- Founded: 2011
- School board: Peel District School Board
- Superintendent: Jeff deFreitas
- Area trustee: David Green
- Principal: Omari Rhoden
- Grades: 9-12
- Enrolment: 1563 (May 2022)
- Language: English
- Campus: Suburban
- Area: Brampton
- Colours: Dark blue, and Green
- Mascot: Grizzly Bear
- Team name: Grizzlies
- Website: dsssonline.com

David Suzuki Secondary School is an institution located in Brampton, Ontario, Canada. The school is named after Canadian environmental activist David Suzuki. The school draws most of its students from the area bounded by Queen Street West, Hurontario Street, Bovaird Drive West, and Mississauga Road. David Suzuki SS also offers a Sports Specialist High Skills Major (SHSM) program (grade 11–12) and a French Immersion program (grade 10–12).

== Campus ==
David Suzuki SS has an AstroTurf field and track facility. It also borders on Teramoto park where students can access baseball and cricket facilities. David Suzuki SS was built by Percon Construction. Building began on 1 May 2010 and was completed on 1 September 2011, estimated at a value of $27,910,000.

== Feeder schools ==
Elementary Schools

- James Potter Public School (K-5)
- Northwood Public School (K-5)
- Glendale Public School (K-5)
- Homestead Public School (K-5)
- Springbrook Public School (K-8)
- McClure Public School (K-8)

Middle Schools

- Beatty-Fleming Senior Public School (6-8)
- Royal Orchard Middle School (6-8)
- McCrimmon Middle School (6-8)

== See also ==
- Education in Ontario
- List of secondary schools in Ontario
