= Thomas L. Kennedy Secondary School =

Coordinates: 43.5813°N 79.6203°W

Location
- 3100 Hurontario Street; Mississauga, Ontario, L5B 1N7; Canada

Information
- School type: High school
- Motto: Lead, Inspire, Achieve
- Founded: 1953
- School board: Peel District School Board
- Superintendent: Darren Van Hooydonk
- Area trustee: Sue Lawton and John Marchant
- School number: 2352
- Principal: Lea-Anne Greene-Smith
- Grades: 9-12
- Enrolment: 940
- Language: English
- Colours: Garnet and White
- Mascot: The Kougar
- Team name: Kougars
- Communities served: Cooksville
- Feeder schools: Briarwood Public School, Camilla Road Sr. Public School, Clifton Public School, Corsair Public School, Fairview Public School, Munden Park Public School, Silver Creek Public School, Thornwood Public School, The Valleys Sr. Public School
- Public transit access: Cooksville GO Station, MiWay Bus #1, 2, 28, 91, 101, 103
- Website: www.tlkennedy.com

Thomas L. Kennedy Secondary School (aka, T. L. Kennedy Secondary School) is a school located in Mississauga, Ontario, that was erected in honour of former Premier of Ontario, Thomas Laird Kennedy. Kennedy had been a longtime resident of the Dixie area of Cooksville, Ontario (now part of Mississauga). He was Master of the River Park Masonic Lodge in Streetsville, Ontario. Thomas L. Kennedy Secondary School first opened to approximately four hundred and fifty students in September 1953.

== Academics ==
The premiere of T. L. Kennedy's Leadership Academy was in September 2013. Students apply for this program in grade 8. T.L. Kennedy began a new academic program in 2011 that allows students to obtain a "Specialist High Skills Major" in Business on their Ontario Secondary School diploma. The school has also started a "Specialist High Skills Major" in Technology from the beginning of the 2012 school year.

== Athletics ==
The school has an extracurricular program, including athletic and sports teams. The school has successful basketball and cricket teams.

== Arts ==
T.L. Kennedy has a music program including clubs such as the TLK Rock Band and the TLK Choir. Students from all grades participate in these clubs and perform at many school wide and community events.

=== Drama productions ===
Play	Date
Quantum Murder Mystery	2024
Evilocity	April 2016
Bottom's Version	April 10–12, 2014
Writer's Block	April 2011
The Sultan's Tale	2009
The Twelve Labours of Don Quioxte	2008
Pirates in Neverland	2006
Bottom's Version	2004
Telling Stories	2003
TRace	2002
Departures and Arrivals	1993
Our Town	1973
Where's Charlie	1972
Charlie's Aunt	1963

== Special events ==
=== September ===
- The annual Terry Fox Run has been running since 1983 and as of March 2010, TLK students have cumulatively raised over $234,000.

=== March ===
- Nutrition Month 2014 was celebrated with "The Great Big Crunch", and contests.

=== April ===
- Day of Pink is celebrated annually
- Annual School Drama Production or M.A.A.D night (produced on alternating years)

=== May ===
- T.L. Kennedy has an annual Asian Heritage Month celebrations which include Asian guest speakers, Asian themed events, workshops and fundraisers.

== Feeder schools ==
T. L. Kennedy Family Schools

- Briarwood Public School
- Camilla Road Sr. Public School
- Clifton Public School
- Corsair Public School
- Fairview Public School
- Munden Park Public School
- Silver Creek Public School
- Thornwood Public School
- The Valleys Sr. Public School

== Notable students and alumni ==
- Gil Moore, former member of rock band Triumph, and founder and CEO of Metalworks Studios

== See also ==
- Education in Ontario
- List of secondary schools in Ontario
