= Bronte College =

Location
- 88 Bronte College Court; Mississauga, Ontario, L5B 1M9; Canada; 43°34′14″N 79°36′21″W

Information
- School type: Private Day and Boarding High School
- Motto: Learning to Understand
- Founded: 1991
- School number: 875112
- Principal: Anne-Louise Power
- Grades: 9-12
- Enrollment: Rolling
- Average class size: 15
- Education system: Ontario Education System
- Language: English
- Campus type: Urban
- Website: www.brontecollege.ca

Bronte College Bronte College is a private, co-educational day and boarding high school located in Mississauga, Ontario, Canada. Established in 1991, the school offers the Ontario Secondary School Diploma (OSSD) for students in grades 9 through 12. Advanced Placement (AP) courses are available to Grade 12 students. Situated in central Mississauga, the campus is conveniently close to shopping malls, public transit, and is approximately 20 minutes from Toronto Pearson International Airport.

== Campus and residence ==
Bronte College is located at 88 Bronte College Court. The building has facilities including a library, auditorium, indoor gymnasium, fitness centre, outdoor field and full-service cafeteria. The eight (8) floor student residence is conveniently located in the same building as the school. There are four floors designated for female students and four floors designated for male students. The residence offers majority single rooms. A homestay program is offered as an extension to the residence building.

== Academic programs ==
Bronte College has three semester intakes; September, February and July.

The school offers the Ontario Secondary School Diploma (OSSD).

Additional programs offered include:

- Advanced Placement (AP)
- Express Program
- English Language Support

Bronte College is an official test centre for:

- AP (Advanced Placement)
- IELTS (International English Language Testing System)

== Summer Camp ==
Bronte College offers a Summer Camp program for ages 12–17 in July and August. Two camp programs are offered; English Language and Math & Science Camp. All camps include approximately 3 hours of daily classroom instruction, accommodation, nutritious meals, health insurance, daily activities, and weekend excursions.

== See also ==
- Education in Ontario
- List of secondary schools in Ontario
