= North Park Secondary School =

Location
- 10 North Park Drive; Brampton, Ontario, L6S 3M1; Canada; 43.72014°N 79.74853°W

Information
- School type: Public High school
- Founded: 1978
- School board: Peel District School Board
- Superintendent: Ozma Masood
- Area trustee: Karla Bailey
- Principal: Engy Boutros
- Vice Principals: Theresa Grindley; Susanna Meszaros
- Grades: 9-12
- Enrolment: 1362 (January 2025)
- Language: English
- Colours: Blue, Orange and White
- Mascot: Viking
- Team name: Vikings
- Website: northpark.peelschools.org

North Park Secondary School is a public high school located at the major intersection of Williams Parkway and North Park Drive in Brampton, Ontario, Canada. It was founded in 1978, making it one of the oldest high schools in the area. North Park is best known for being one of three high schools in Brampton to offer the IBT program.

== See also ==
- Education in Ontario
- List of secondary schools in Ontario
