= Cardinal Ambrozic Catholic Secondary School =

Location
- 10 Castle Oaks Crossing; Brampton, Ontario, L6P 3A2; Canada; 43°47′17″N 79°41′00″W

Information
- School type: Public, Separate high school
- Religious affiliation: Catholic
- Founded: September 8, 2009
- School board: Dufferin-Peel Catholic District School Board
- Superintendent: Les Storey
- Area trustee: Shawn Xaviour
- School number: 749813
- Principal: Tino Malta
- Grades: 9–12
- Enrollment: 1,500 (September 2020)
- Language: English
- Campus: Suburban
- Area: North East Brampton
- Colours: Burgundy and gold
- Mascot: The RiverHawk
- Team name: RiverHawks
- Website: Official website

Cardinal Ambrozic Catholic Secondary School is a separate high school located in Brampton, Ontario, Canada, named after Aloysius Ambrozic. The school is part of the Dufferin-Peel Catholic District School Board. It ranked 130 of 749 schools in Ontario in 2018/2019. This school is a traditional Catholic school. It was named in honour of Cardinal Ambrozic who died in August 2011. Notable people who attended this school include Alessia Cara.

Cardinal Ambrozic CSS was featured in multiple news stories on March 22, 2017, when roughly one hundred parents slept outside the school in order to register their children for grade 9 at 7:30am that morning. The first parent in line arrived at the school at 12pm the day prior.

== Feeder schools ==
- Fr. Francis McSpiritt Catholic Elementary School
- Holy Spirit Catholic Elementary School
- Our Lady of Lourdes Catholic Elementary School
- St. Andre Bessette Catholic Elementary School
- St. Patrick Catholic Elementary School (South of Mayfield Road)
- Father Clair Tipping Catholic Elementary School

== Notable alumni ==
- Alessia Cara, singer-songwriter
- Chris Osei-Kusi, football player, lawyer
- Sam Acheampong, football player
- Jahkeele Marshall-Rutty, soccer player
- Kevaughn Tavernier, soccer player

== See also ==
- Aloysius Ambrozic, namesake
- Education in Ontario
- List of secondary schools in Ontario
