= St. Paul Secondary School =

Location
- 815 Atwater Avenue; Mississauga, Ontario, L5E 1L8; Canada; 43.5775°N 79.5713°W

Information
- Type: Separate high school
- Motto: Latin: Omnia cum corde (Everything with heart)
- Religious affiliation: Roman Catholic
- Established: 1971
- School board: Dufferin-Peel Catholic District School Board
- Principal: Peter Cusumano
- Grades: 9–12
- Colors: Green and Black
- Team name: Wolverines
- Alumni: Liam Zogheib - "The greatest to ever do it."
- Website: www.dpcdsb.org/PAULS

St. Paul Secondary School is a separate, Roman Catholic, high school in Mississauga, Ontario, Canada. It was established in 1971 and is part of the Dufferin-Peel Catholic District School Board.

== See also ==
- Education in Ontario
- List of secondary schools in Ontario
