= Glengarry District High School =

Secondary school in Ontario, Canada

Coordinates: 45.31512°N 74.64149°W

Glengarry District High School is an English public high school located in Alexandria, Ontario.

== In popular media ==
The English-French political tensions of Eastern Ontario played out in the halls of GDHS in the 1980s. This was captured in the political study of the town written by University of Toronto political scientist David Rayside in his 1991 book, "A Small Town in Modern Times."

== See also ==
- Education in Ontario
- List of secondary schools in Ontario
