= Humberview Secondary School =

Location
- 135 Kingsview Drive; Caledon, Ontario, L7E 3V8; Canada; 43.8884°N 79.7373°W

Information
- School type: High school
- Motto: Education is not a business.
- Religious affiliation: Public
- Founded: 1974
- School board: Peel District School Board
- Superintendent: Michael Logue
- Area trustee: Stan Cameron
- Principal: John Colton
- Grades: 9-12+
- Enrolment: 1,372 (2019-2020)
- Language: English, French immersion
- Colours: Red, Gold and Blue
- Mascot: Husky
- Team name: Humberview Huskies
- Special programs: Regional Enhanced Program
- Website: humberviewss.ca

Humberview Secondary School (HVSS) (formerly The Humberview School, or Humberview Senior Public School) is a public high school located in Bolton, Caledon, Ontario, Canada, and is administered by the Peel District School Board (PDSB). It is one of four secondary schools in Caledon. Founded in 1973 as The Humberview School (before its transition to a high school), the school is currently situated at 135 Kingsview Drive. The current principal is John Colton.

== Incidents ==
- On Oct 3rd, 2025, at approximately 8 p.m. during a Friday Night Lights football game celebrating the school's 50th anniversary, the game was forced to end prematurely following a significant disturbance in the crowd. The incident involved multiple altercations and pepper spray being used. Paramedics treated two people for pepper spray with another youth transported to the hospital for serious injuries after a physical altercation.
- On Feb 7th, 2019, a student was charged with six counts of assault with a weapon following a fight. The student reportedly used brass knuckles and an unidentified noxious substance, resulting in minor injuries to five individuals.

== Notable students ==
- Cory Trépanier, artist
- Organik, founder of the King Of The Dot battle rap league.

== See also ==
- Education in Ontario
- List of secondary schools in Ontario
- FIRST Robotics
