= Fletcher's Meadow Secondary School =

Location
- 10750 Chinguacousy Road; Brampton, Ontario, L7A 2Z7; Canada; 43.70029°N 79.82886°W

Information
- School type: State secondary school
- Founded: 2005
- School board: Peel District School Board
- Superintendent: Rasulan Hoppie
- Area trustee: Will Davies
- Principal: Nadine Deerr
- Staff: 100+
- Grades: 9-12
- Enrolment: 1841 (2025-2026)
- Language: English
- Colours: Black and teal
- Team name: Arrows
- Website: fletchersmeadow.peelschools.org

Fletcher's Meadow Secondary School is a high school located in Brampton, Ontario, Canada.

== Mainstage production ==
Each year, Fletcher's showcases on a play, musical or variety show. These shows are presented by the Arts Department and have been viewed by such socialites as Angelina Jolie.

- 2007: Fame - musical
- 2008: iBelieve - showcase of talent
- 2009: Stop the Violence - showcase of arts
- 2010: 12 Angry Jurors - adaptation of the movie 12 Angry Men
- 2011: 7 Stories - play written by Morris Panych
- 2013: ZAP - play by Paul Fleischman
- 2014: iRemember - original play/musical celebrating the ten year anniversary of the school
- 2015: The Laramie Project - play by Moisés Kaufman
- 2016: Fletcher's Winter Talent Showcase - talent show

== Notable alumni ==
- Keshia Chanté
- Doneil Henry
- Tory Lanez
- Winnie Harlow
- Houdini (rapper)

== See also ==
- Education in Ontario
- List of secondary schools in Ontario
