= Erindale Secondary School =

Coordinates: 43.5389°N 79.6667°W

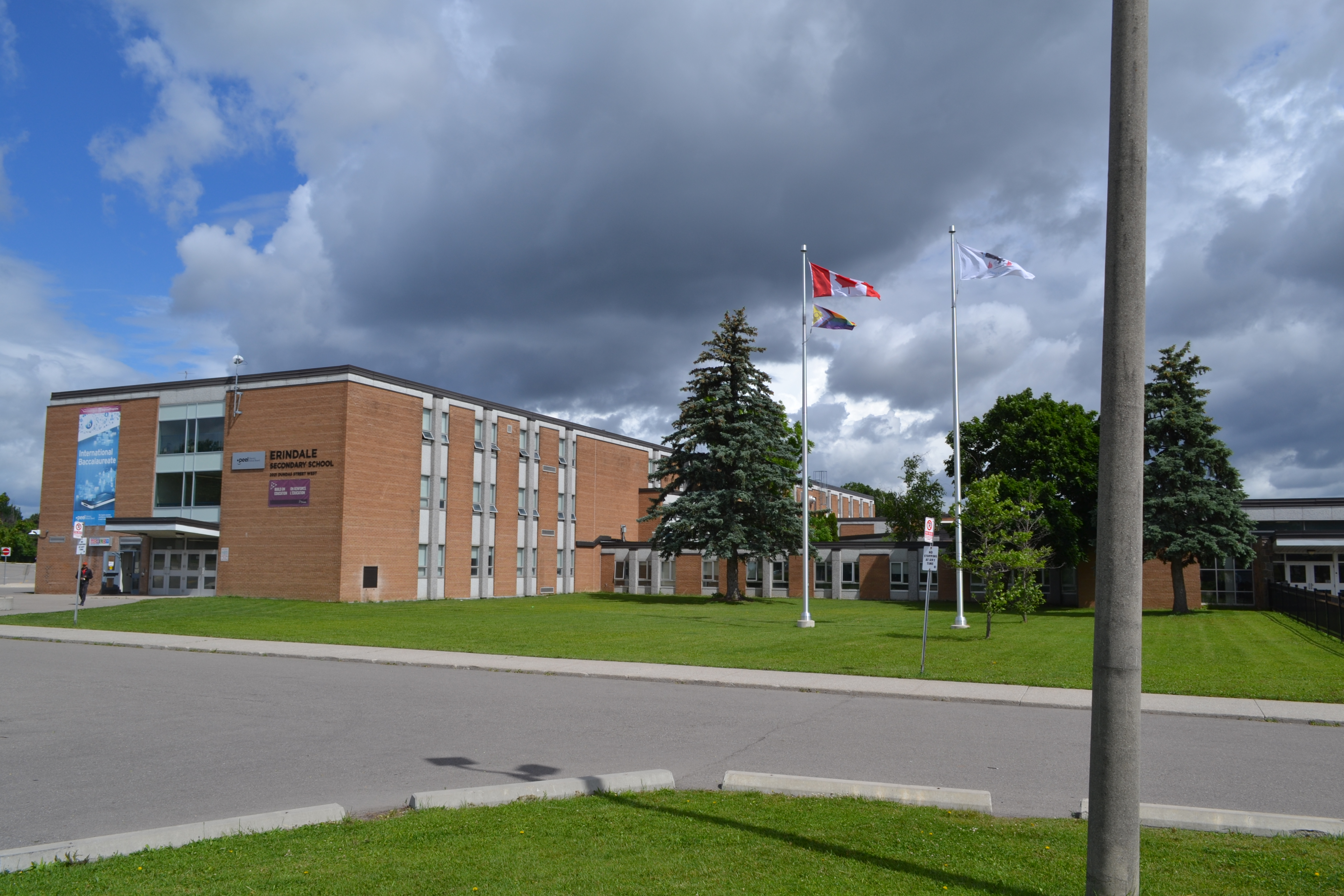

Location
- 2021 Dundas Street West; Mississauga, Ontario, L5K 1R2; Canada

Information
- School type: High school
- Motto: Let all who merit bear the palm
- Religious affiliation: Public
- Founded: 1967
- School board: Peel District School Board
- Superintendent: Mary Zammit
- Area trustee: Brad MacDonald
- School number: 909092
- Principal: Pradeep Rajah
- Grades: 9-12
- Enrollment: 981 (2023-24)
  - Grade 9: 219
  - Grade 10: 248
  - Grade 11: 261
  - Grade 12: 253
- Language: English
- Colours: Green and blue
- Mascot: Elk (formerly Raiders)
- Team name: Erindale Elks (formerly Raiders)
- Feeder schools: Homelands Senior Public School, Erin Mills Middle School
- Website: erindale.peelschools.org

Erindale Secondary School is a secondary school of the Peel District School Board serving the Erindale community of Western Mississauga, Ontario. Erindale Secondary School was founded in 1967. Erindale offers the International Baccalaureate (IB) program and cooperative education.

== Notable alumni ==
- Kevin Kain, tropical disease expert based at the Toronto General Hospital
- Dave Poulin, former NHL centre
- Mike Bullard, television personality
- Pat Bullard, comedian
- Christine Magee (née Bishop) (Sleep Country Canada)
- Kevin Newman, news anchor for CTV television network
- Brian Hayward, former NHL goaltender and current colour analyst for the Anaheim Ducks
- John Roberts, FOX News Anchor
- Jamal Mayers, professional hockey player with the Chicago Blackhawks
- Sterling Hinds, Canadian Olympic sprinter and former CFL player
- Rob Pike, senior scientist for Google, Inc.
- Martin Streek (d. 2009), radio personality
- Dwight Edwards, professional football player for the Toronto Argonauts, Mississauga Sports Hall of Fame 2000
- Robert Tibshirani, professor of statistics at Stanford University
- Lauren Toyota, Canadian television personality
- Thomas McBroom, Canadian golf course architect
- Casey Cizikas, NHL player for the New York Islanders
- Karen Preston, former Olympian and two-time Canadian figure skating champion

== Gallery ==
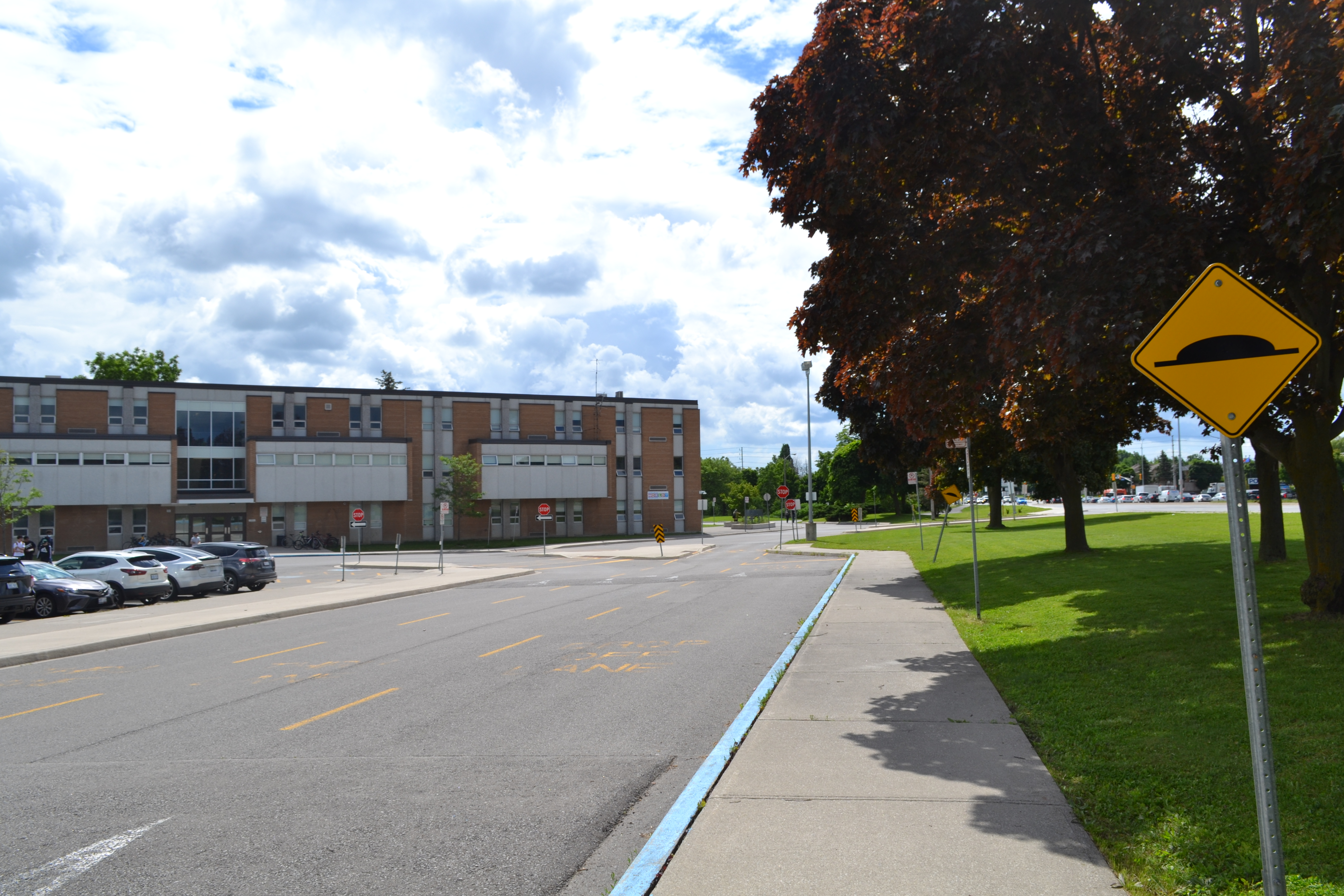

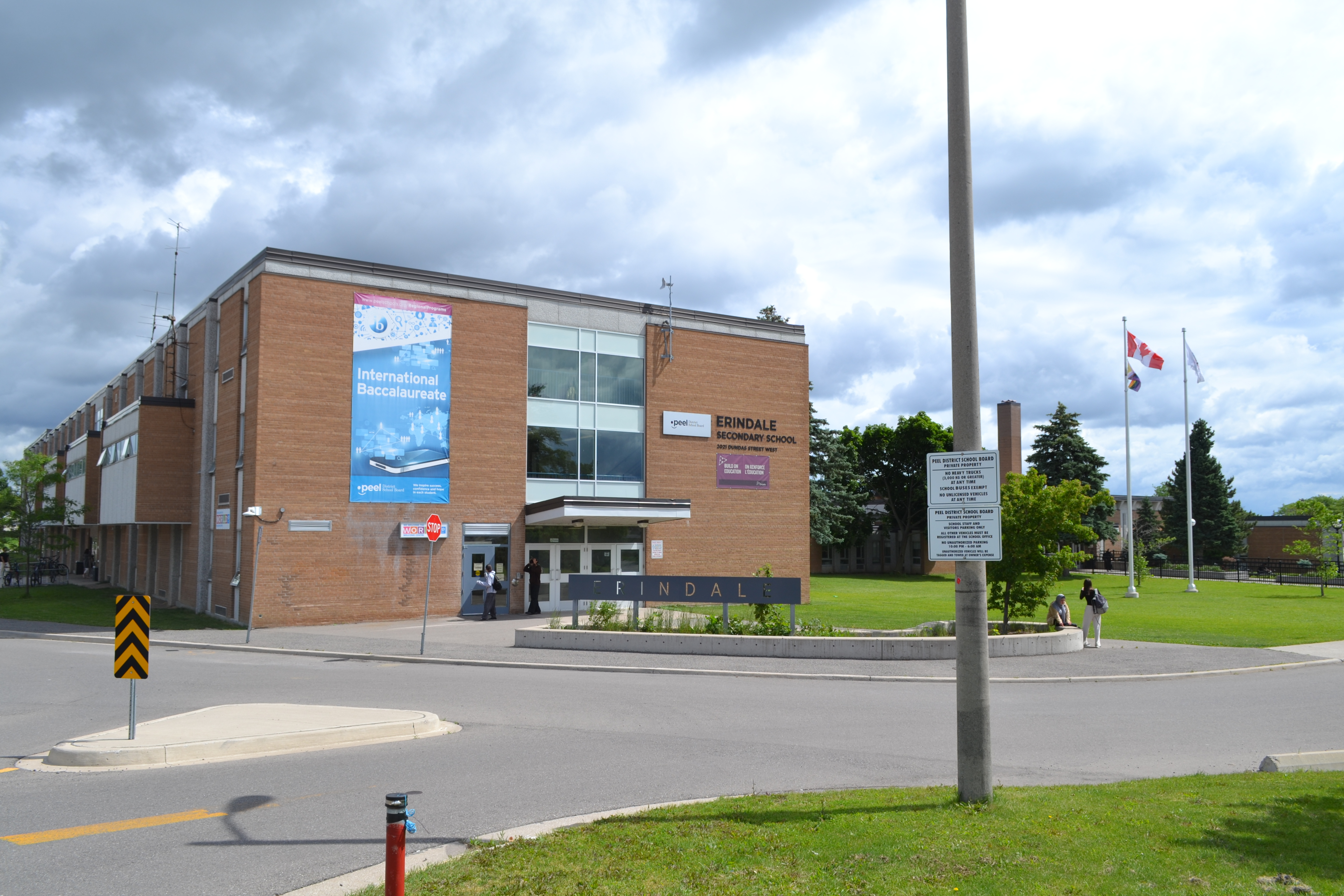

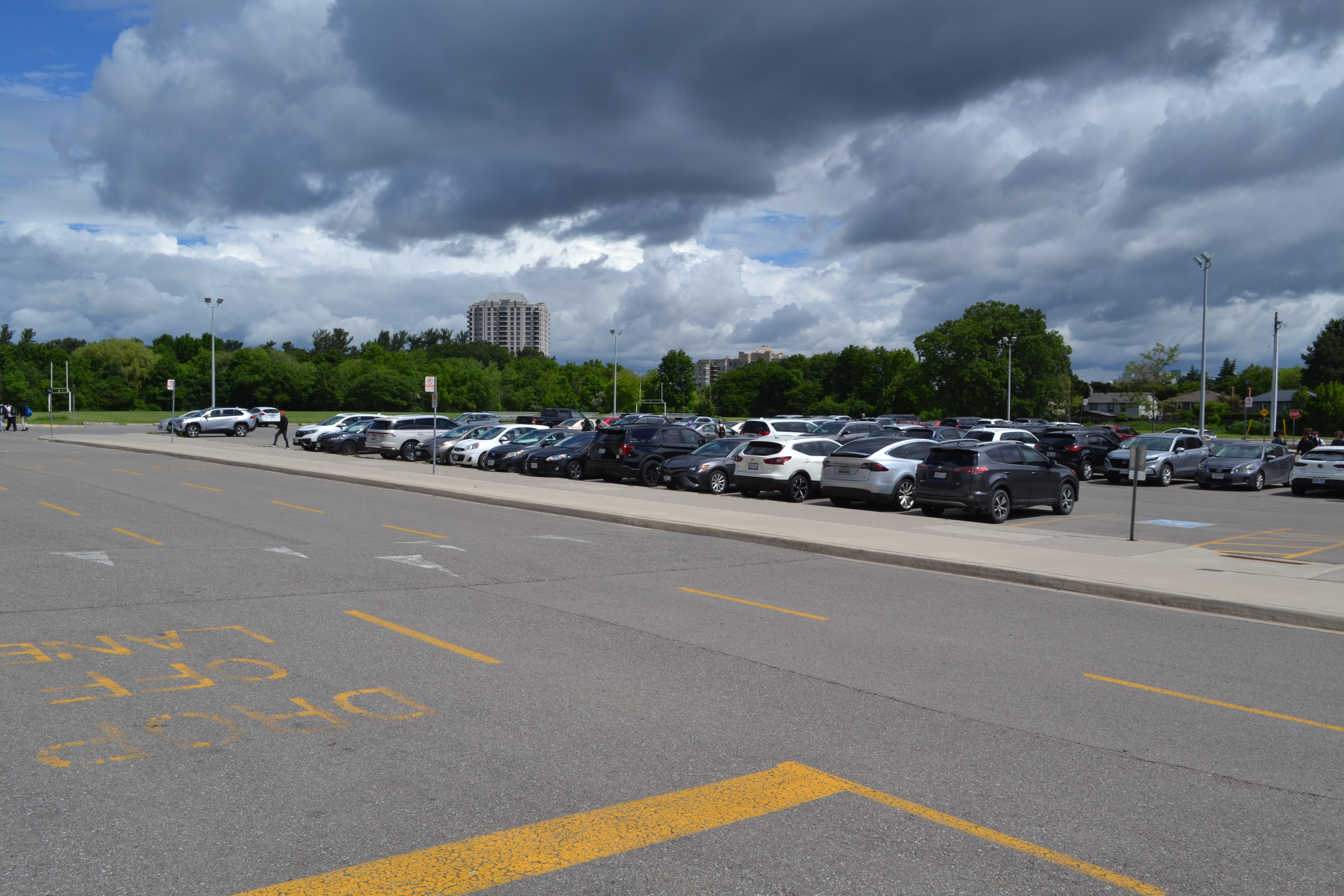

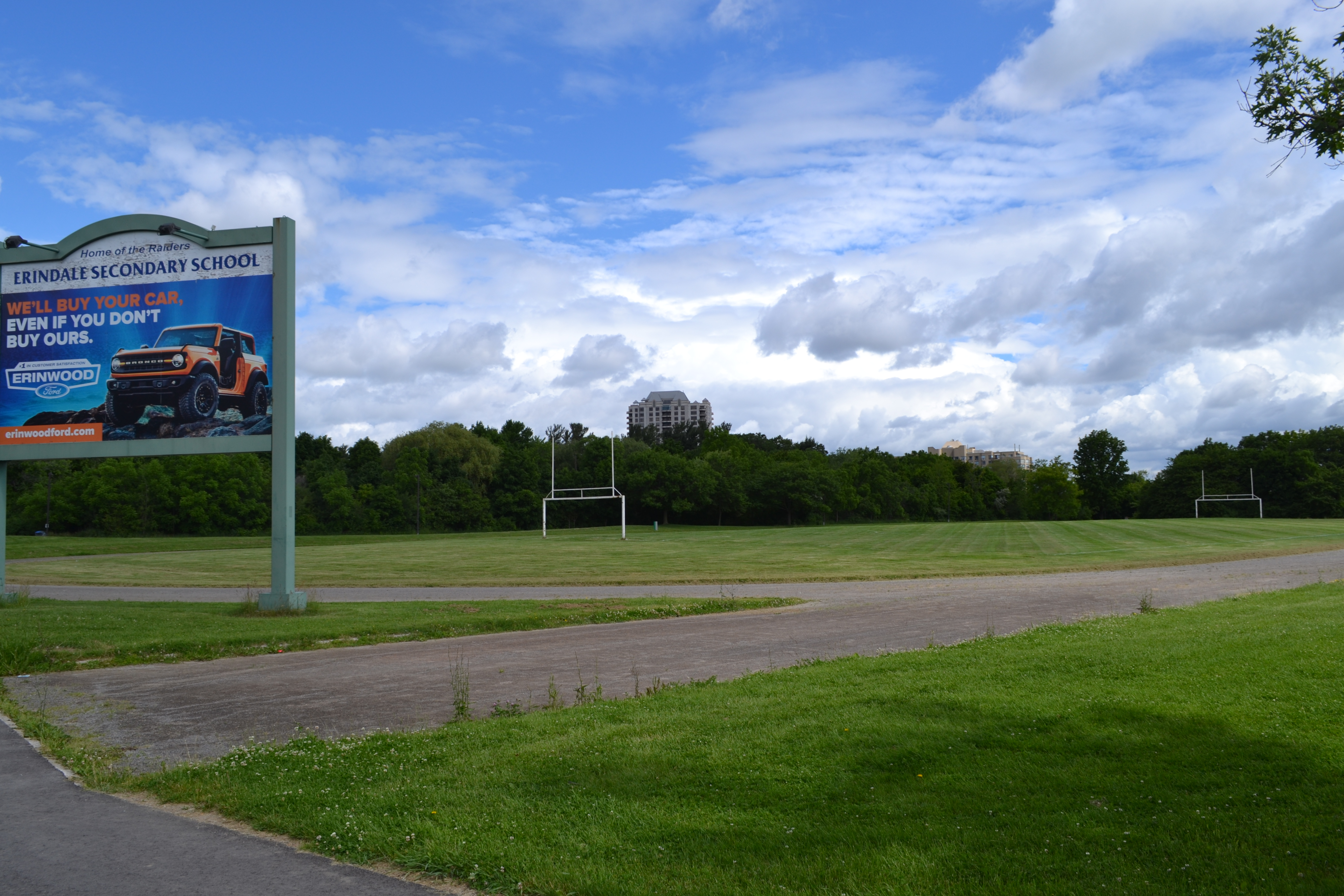

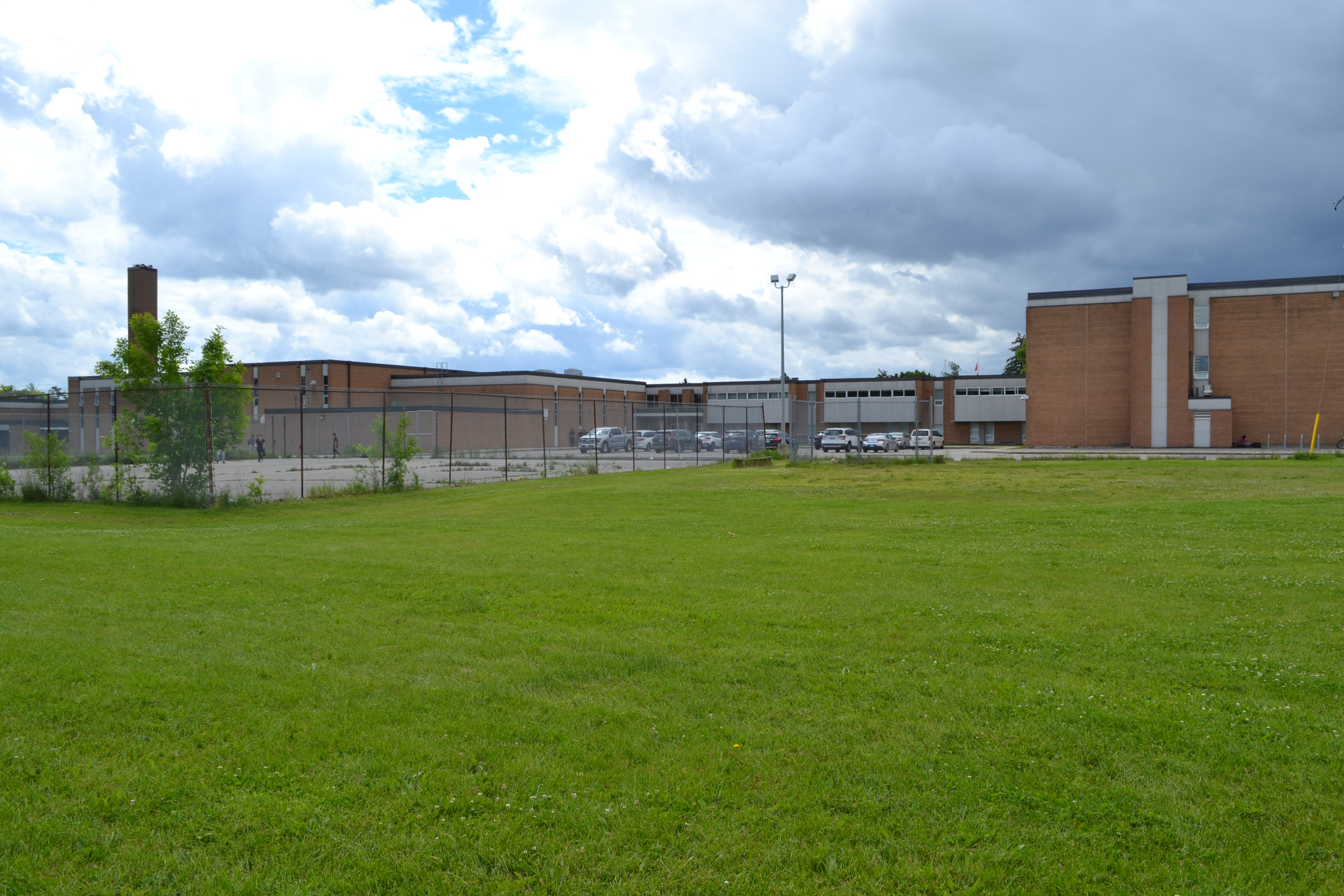

== See also ==
- Education in Ontario
- List of secondary schools in Ontario
