= Central Peel Secondary School =

Location
- 32 Kennedy Road North; Brampton, Ontario, L6V 1X4; Canada; 43°41′55″N 79°45′05″W

Information
- School type: Public, High school
- Motto: Vires Acquirit Crescendo (Gathering Strength as it Grows)
- Founded: 1960
- School board: Peel District School Board
- Superintendent: Maxine Miller
- Area trustee: David Green; Steve Kavanagh; Suzanne Nurse
- School number: 899828
- Administrator: Belinda Medeiros
- Principal: Giota Woods
- Grades: 9–12
- Enrolment: 1223 (2024)
- Language: English
- Colours: Green and Gold
- Mascot: Griffin
- Team name: Central Peel Griffins

Central Peel Secondary School is a high school that is located in Brampton, Ontario, Canada, and it is operated by the Peel District School Board. As of 2024, the school enrolment stands at 1223. Central Peel opened in 1960. Central Peel offers an Advanced Placement program and a Strings program.

== See also ==
- Education in Ontario
- List of secondary schools in Ontario
