= Peel District School Board =

School board in Ontario, Canada

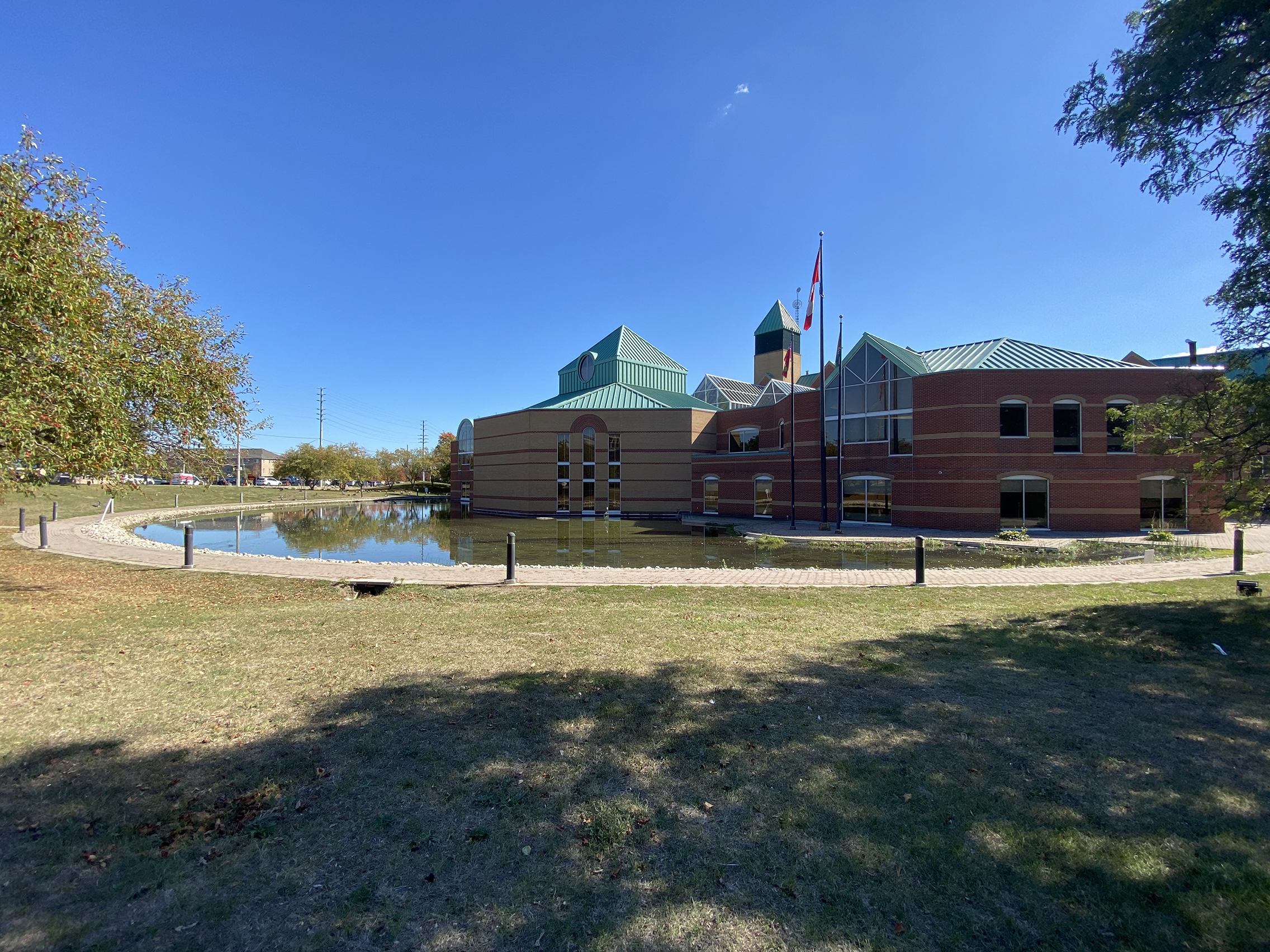

Location
- 5650 Hurontario St; Mississauga, Ontario, L5R 1C6 Canada

District information
- Chief executive officer: Rashmi Swarup
- Chair of the board: Vacant
- Schools: 262 schools (2024-25)
- Budget: ~CA $2.1 billion (2024-2025)
- District ID: B66125

Students and staff
- Students: 148,000+ students (2024-25)
- Staff: 16,321 (2024-25)

Other information
- Elected trustees: 12
- Student Trustees: Amenah Gangat, Shengqun (Julia) Zhu, Indica Simms Johnny
- Indigenous Student Trustee: Indica Simms Johnny
- Website: www.peelschools.org

The Peel District School Board, (PDSB, formerly known as English-Language Public District School Board No. 19 prior to 1999) is the school district for the Region of Peel in Ontario, Canada. The board's 262 schools and other facilities, including two online schools, are used by approximately 148,000 students between kindergarten and the twelfth grade.

The board employs more than 15,000 full-time staff and is the largest employer in Peel Region. As of 2023 it is the second largest school board in Canada.

== History ==
In 1970, 10 local boards came together as the Peel County Board of Education. In 1969, the board served a community of a quarter million residents—20 percent of the population. The newly formed Peel County Board had 50,000 students in 114 schools and an operating budget of $41 million.

In 1973, the name changed to the "Peel Board of Education," before being changed the "Peel District School Board" in 1998.

The Peel board unveiled its current logo in September 2006. The design was based on the feedback from over 500 people including staff, students, parents, representatives of faith and culture communities and unions and federations.

=== Directors ===
* indicates a namesake for a school in the PDSB

- John Fraser, 1973-1988*
- Bob Lee, 1988–c. 1993*
- Harold Brathwaite, 1994–2002*
- Jim Grieve, 2002–2009*
- Tony Pontes, 2010–2017*
- Peter Joshua, 2017–2020
- Colleen Russell-Rawlins, 2020–2021 (interim)
- Rashmi Swarup, 2021–present

== Demographics and cultural sensitivity ==
The Peel District School Board is ethnically and culturally diverse, largely due to its high student population. PDSB was among the first Canadian school boards to permit students to wear kirpans to classes. The school board does not allow religious leaders to lead prayer sessions within schools.

== Programs ==
=== Adult and continuing education ===
PDSB offers a variety of adult programs during the day, at night and on weekends. Programs include credit programs to help adults complete their secondary school diploma, adult ESL programs to help adults develop and refine their English language skills, and literacy and basic skills courses to help adults upgrade specific skills. The board received media attention in 2011 for its Foreign-Trained Teacher course, a course designed to help new Canadians enter the teacher profession.

PDSB offers International Language Programs on weekends for school-aged students. At the secondary level, students can earn credits towards their secondary school diploma. Students additionally have access to night and summer school, literacy and math support, and online school.

=== French immersion ===
French immersion begins in grade 1 and extended French begins in grade 7. Registration for both programs takes place in January, with the board offering information for parents on how to decide whether French immersion is right for their child and other information about French immersion.

=== Regional Enhanced Program ===
The Peel District School Board runs the ELC Regional Enhanced Program, in grades 1 to 12, a gifted education program. The program is described as for students having "an unusually advanced degree of general intellectual ability that requires differentiated learning experiences of a depth and breadth beyond those normally provided in the regular school programme to satisfy the level of educational potential indicated."

There are two high schools designated as Peel Regional Enhanced Centres that provide the Enhanced programming and curriculum from Grade 9 to Grade 12. The Woodlands School is attended by ELC students in most of Mississauga, and Heart Lake Secondary School is attended by ELC students in Caledon, Brampton, and the neighbourhood of Malton in Mississauga. The precise number and variety of Enhanced courses differs from school to school, but most schools offer the core mandatory courses as Enhanced.

== Organization of the school system within the Board ==
The Board organizes its schools into "school families." School families designate the respective feeder schools into each of the secondary schools within the PDSB. The following list is the organization from the 2018-2019 school year.

=== Caledon ===
School family	Secondary school (9-12)	Intermediate (Middle) School (6/7-8)	Elementary school (K-5/6)	K-8 school (K-8)
Humberview	Humberview Secondary School	Allan Drive Middle School	Ellwood Memorial Public School; James Bolton Public School	Caledon East Public School; Macville Public School; Palgrave Public School
Mayfield	Mayfield Secondary School		Alton Public School; Belfountain Public School	Alloa Public School; Caledon Central Public School; Herb Campbell Public School; James Grieve Public School; Southfields Village Public School; Tony Pontes Public School

=== Brampton ===
School family	Secondary school (9-12)	Intermediate (Middle) School (6/7-8)	Elementary school (K-5/6)	K-8 school (K-8)
Bramalea	Bramalea Secondary School	Balmoral Drive Senior Public School; Earnscliffe Sr. Public School	Aloma Crescent Public School; Birchbank Public School; Clark Boulevard Public School; Dorset Drive Public School; Eastbourne Drive Public School; Fallingdale Public School; Folkstone Public School	
Brampton Centennial	Brampton Centennial Secondary School	Centennial Sr. Public School; Sir William Gage Middle School	Copeland Public School; McHugh Public School; Morton Way Public School; Queen Street Public School; Ridgeview Public School	Churchville Public School; Ray Lawson Public School; Roberta Bondar Public School
Castlebrooke	Castlebrooke Secondary School	Calderstone Middle School	Claireville Public School; Red Willow Public School	Beryl Ford Public School; Castle Oaks Public School; Castlemore Public School; Sir Isaac Brock Public School; Thorndale Public School; Walnut Grove Public School
Central Peel	Central Peel Secondary School	Gordon Graydon Sr. Public School; Nibi Emosaawdang Public School	Agnes Taylor Public School; Arnott Charlton Public School; Harold F. Loughin Public School; Kingswood Drive Public School; Madoc Drive Public School	Sir Winston Churchill Public School
Chinguacousy	Chinguacousy Secondary School	Greenbriar Sr. Public School	Goldcrest Public School; Grenoble Public School; Jefferson Public School	
David Suzuki	David Suzuki Secondary School	Beatty-Fleming Sr. Public School; Royal Orchard Middle School	Glendale Public School; James Potter Public School; Homestead Public School; Northwood Public School; Westervelts Corners Public School	Springbrook Public School; McClure Public School
Fletcher's Meadow	Fletcher's Meadow Secondary School; Parkholme School	Cheyne Middle School; McCrimmon Middle School	Brisdale Public School; Burnt Elm Public School; Edenbrook Hill Public School; Nelson Mandela Public School; Rowntree Public School; Worthington Public School	Aylesbury Public School; Dolson Public School; Malala Yousafzai Public School; Mount Pleasant Village Public School; Red Cedar Public School; Tribune Drive Public School
Harold Brathwaite	Harold M. Brathwaite Secondary School		Fernforest Public School	Great Lakes Public School; Ross Drive Public School
Heart Lake	Heart Lake Secondary School	Robert H. Lagerquist Sr. Public School	Conestoga Public School; Esker Lake Public School; Somerset Drive Public School; Terry Fox Public School	
Jean Augustine	Jean Augustine Secondary School			Eldorado Public School; Huttonville Public School; Ingleborough Public School; Lorenville Public School; Whaley's Corners Public school
Louise Arbour	Louise Arbour Secondary School	Lougheed Middle School; Sunny View Middle School	Carberry Public School; Hewson Public School; Larkspur Public School; Springdale Middle School; Stanley Mills Public School	Countryside Village Public School; Mount Royal Public School
North Park	North Park Secondary School; Judith Nyman Secondary School	Williams Parkway Sr. Public School	Hanover Public School; Hilldale Public School; Massey Street Public School; Russell D. Barber Public School	
Sandalwood Heights	Sandalwood Heights Secondary School			Eagle Plains Public School; Fairlawn Public School; Mountain Ash Public School; Pte. Buckam Singh Public School; Robert J. Lee Public School; Shaw Public School; Treeline Public School
Turner Fenton	Turner Fenton Secondary School; Peel Alternative School North	Fletcher's Creek Sr. Public School; William G. Davis Sr. Public School	Cherrytree Public School; Helen Wilson Public School; Hickory Wood Public School; Parkway Public School; Sir Wilfrid Laurier Public School	

=== Mississauga ===
School family	Secondary school (9-12)	Intermediate (Middle) School (6/7-8)	Elementary school (K-4/5/6)	K-8 school (K-8)
Applewood Heights	Applewood Heights Secondary School	Bristol Road Middle School; Fairwind Sr. Public School; Tomken Road Middle School	Barondale Public School; Burnhamthorpe Public School; Champlain Trail Public School; Cooksville Creek Public School; Dixie Public School; Huntington Ridge Public School; Nahani Way Public School; Silverthorn Public School	
Cawthra Park	Cawthra Park Secondary School; Peel Alternative School South	Allan A. Martin Sr. Public School	Clifton Public School; Janet I. McDougald Public School; Munden Park Public School; Westacres Public School	
Clarkson	Clarkson Secondary School	Green Glade Senior Public School	Clarkson Public School; Garthwood Park Public School; Owenwood Public School	Hillside Public School
Erindale	Erindale Secondary School	Erin Mills Middle School; Homelands Sr. Public School	Brookmede Public School; Oakridge Public School; Sawmill Valley Public School; Sheridan Park Public School; Thorn Lodge Public School	
Glenforest	Glenforest Secondary School	Glenhaven Sr. Public School	Forest Glen Public School; Brian W. Fleming Public School	
John Fraser	John Fraser Secondary School	Thomas Street Middle School	Castlebridge Public School; Credit Valley Public School; Middlebury Public School	
Lincoln Alexander	Lincoln M. Alexander Secondary School	Darcel Avenue Sr. Public School; Morning Star Middle School	Brandon Gate Public School; Corliss Public School; Dunrankin Drive Public School; Lancaster Public School; Marvin Heights Public School; Ridgewood Public School	
Lorne Park	Lorne Park Secondary School	Hillcrest Middle School; Green Glade Senior Public School	Owenwood Public School; Lorne Park Public School; Whiteoaks Public School	Tecumseh Public School
Meadowvale	Meadowvale Secondary School	Edenwood Middle School; Lisgar Middle School	Kindree Public School; Maple Wood Public School; Miller's Grove Public School; Osprey Woods Public School; Plowman's Park Public School; Plum Tree Park Public School; Settler's Green Public School; Shelter Bay Public School; Trelawny Public School	
Mississauga	Mississauga Secondary School	David Leeder Middle School	Britannia Public School; Derry West Village Public School; Levi Creek Public School; Meadowvale Village Public School	
Port Credit	Port Credit Secondary School	Camilla Road Senior Public School; Queen Elizabeth Sr. Public School	Cashmere Avenue Public School; Corsair Public School; Floradale Public School; Forest Avenue Public School; Kenollie Public School; Mineola Public School	Riverside Public School
Rick Hansen	Rick Hansen Secondary School; Peel Alternative School Central	Fallingbrook Middle School	Edenrose Public School; Sherwood Mills Public School; Whitehorn Public School	
Stephen Lewis	Stephen Lewis Secondary School; Applewood School	Erin Centre Middle School; Ruth Thompson Middle School	Artesian Drive Public School; Churchill Meadows Public School; McKinnon Public School; Oscar Peterson Public School	
Streetsville	Streetsville Secondary School; West Credit Secondary School	Dolphin Sr. Public School; Hazel McCallion Sr. Public School	Ray Underhill Public School; Vista Heights Public School; Willow Way Public School	
TL Kennedy	Thomas L. Kennedy Secondary School	The Valleys Sr. Public School	Briarwood Public School; Chris Hadfield Public School; Fairview Public School; Silver Creek Public School; Thornwood Public School	Elm Drive Public School
Woodlands	The Woodlands School		McBride Avenue Public School; Springfield Public School	Ellengale Public School; Hawthorn Public School; Queenston Drive Public School

== Controversies ==
Former Vice Principal Ranjit Khatkur of South Asian background alleged that her ethnic/racial background was the reason she was overlooked for promotion to principal despite fulfilling all requirements. Khatkur launched a legal complaint at the Human Rights Tribunal of Ontario alleging systematic discrimination in the Peel public board. One of many such human rights allegations made towards the board. It eventually culminated in allowing the Turner Consulting Group to release a Research Report on Hiring and Promotion at the Peel District School Board. The 111-page report led to changes in the hiring and promotion policies in the Peel Board. Previously Principals conducted interviews alone without having to demonstrate why they chose the applicants they did or document what questions they asked. The changes include having two people conducting an interview to eliminate bias, the principal is not part of the promotion process thereby eliminating their "gatekeeper" role, and begin a diversity census. The report found that it was not only ethnic or visible minorities that experienced discrimination. Tana Turner found that even some white males suspected nepotism, favoritism, or cronyism.

In 2023, the Peel District School Board attempted to remove all titles that had been published before 2008 as an "equity-based weeding process". These books were perceived as inherently lacking inclusivity and thus harming students based solely on their publication date. The district prevented these books from being donated and required them to be thrown out. There were plans to remove any book published more than fifteen years ago on an ongoing basis "to remain culturally relevant". Stephen Lecce ordered the weeding process to be halted from its completion after thousands of books had already been removed.

== Trustees ==
The board's chair is vacant and vice chair is vacant

Trustee	Wards	City/Area
Karla Bailey	Ward 7 and 8	Brampton
Susan Benjamin	Ward 5	Mississauga
Paula Dametto-Giovannozzi	Wards	Caledon
Jill Promoli	Wards 6 and 11	Mississauga
Jeff Clark	Wards 9 and 10	Mississauga
Chris Campbell	Wards 2 and 6	Brampton
Kathy McDonald	Wards 1 and 5	Brampton
Vince Cerullo	Wards 3 and 4	Mississauga
Brad MacDonald	Ward 2 and 8	Mississauga
Charles Corey	Wards 1 and 7	Mississauga
Jot Dhaliwal	Wards 3 and 4	Brampton
Khushpal Singh Pawar	Wards 9 and 10	Brampton
Pradwit Thapa	N/A - Student trustee for Peel schools north of Highway 401	North Mississauga, Brampton and Caledon
Justin Ko	N/A - Student trustee for Peel schools south of Highway 401	Mississauga
Kawela’tsátste/Austin Chrisjohn	Indigenous Student Trustee	Region of Peel

== Secondary school rankings ==
The Peel District School Board does not officially support the Fraser ranking system and does not rank its schools. The most up-to-date Fraser rankings can be found on the Fraser website.

== See also ==
- Education in Ontario
- Dufferin Peel Catholic District School Board
- List of school districts in Ontario
- List of secondary schools in Ontario
- Book censorship in Canada
