= Stephen Lewis Secondary School (Mississauga) =

Location
- 3675 Thomas Street; Mississauga, Ontario, L5M 7E6; Canada; 43.557°N 79.745°W

Information
- School type: State High school
- Founded: 2006
- School board: Peel District School Board
- Area trustee: Brad MacDonald; Allison Van Wagner
- Principal: Dan Drmanic
- Grades: 9-12
- Enrolment: 1700
- Language: English
- Colours: Red, white, black, and grey
- Mascot: Lenny the Lynx
- Team name: Stephen Lewis Lynx
- Website: stephenlewis.peelschools.org

Stephen Lewis Secondary School is a high school located in the Churchill Meadows neighbourhood of the city of Mississauga in Ontario, Canada and is a part of the Peel District School Board. It is one of two schools in the Greater Toronto Area named after Canadian diplomat and social activist Stephen Lewis. It opened in September 2006. Its feeder schools are Ruth Thompson Middle School and Erin Centre Middle School.

== Villages ==
All students and staff are assigned to one of the four villages upon registration. The Stephen Lewis Villages are named after four Canadian heroes of social justice: June Callwood, Craig Kielburger, Agnes Macphail and David Suzuki.

== Notable alumni ==
- Sudarshan Yellamaraju Professional Golfer
