= Mississauga Secondary School =

Location
- 550 Courtneypark Drive West; Mississauga, Ontario, L5W 1L9; Canada; 43.6251°N 79.7029°W

Information
- School type: Public High school
- Motto: Be Fit to Learn and Learn to Be Fit
- Founded: June 1, 2005
- School board: Peel District School Board
- Superintendent: Leslie Grant
- Area trustee: Jill Promoli
- School number: 925535
- Principal: Cheryl Bobb
- Grades: 9-12
- Enrolment: 982 (June 2025)
- Language: English
- Colours: Navy Blue, Light Blue, Silver and Green
- Team name: Bears
- Website: mississauga.peelschools.org

Mississauga Secondary School (MSS) is a public high school located in Mississauga, Ontario. It operates under the Peel District School Board.

== Description ==
Mississauga Secondary School offers a full range of courses providing all students the opportunity to obtain a secondary school diploma, as outlined in Ontario Secondary Schools Grades 9 to 12, Program and Diploma Requirements, 1999.

The school offers several programs for its student body of 1200. The curriculum being taught follows the standard Ontario school curriculum which offers students different pathways after high school. The courses offered serve the need of majority of the students with several different after school programs. Mississauga Secondary School offers an EHS (Explore High Skills) and a SHSM (Specialist High Skills Major) course in health and wellness. This program allows students to learn more about the health and wellness sector, while also taking regular high school courses.

The technology programs offered include transportation, manufacturing, hospitality and cosmetology. Students have the opportunity to take courses in broadcast arts as well as traditional visual, musical and dramatic arts. Subjects such as Mathematics, Science, History, Geography and Languages are enhanced with this accessibility to technology. The use of technology is promoted with the schools BYOD (Bring your own device) program allowing students to use a variety devices to further their education.

== Ranking ==
According to the Fraser Institute, for the 2022 to 2023 school year, Mississauga Secondary School obtained a rank of 303 out of 746 Ontario secondary schools. It is ranked 24 out of 35 secondary schools in the city of Mississauga. It is also given an overall rating of 6.5/10 by the institute.

== Gallery ==
Former logo of Mississauga Secondary School.

== See also ==
- Education in Ontario
- List of secondary schools in Ontario
