= Judith Nyman Secondary School =

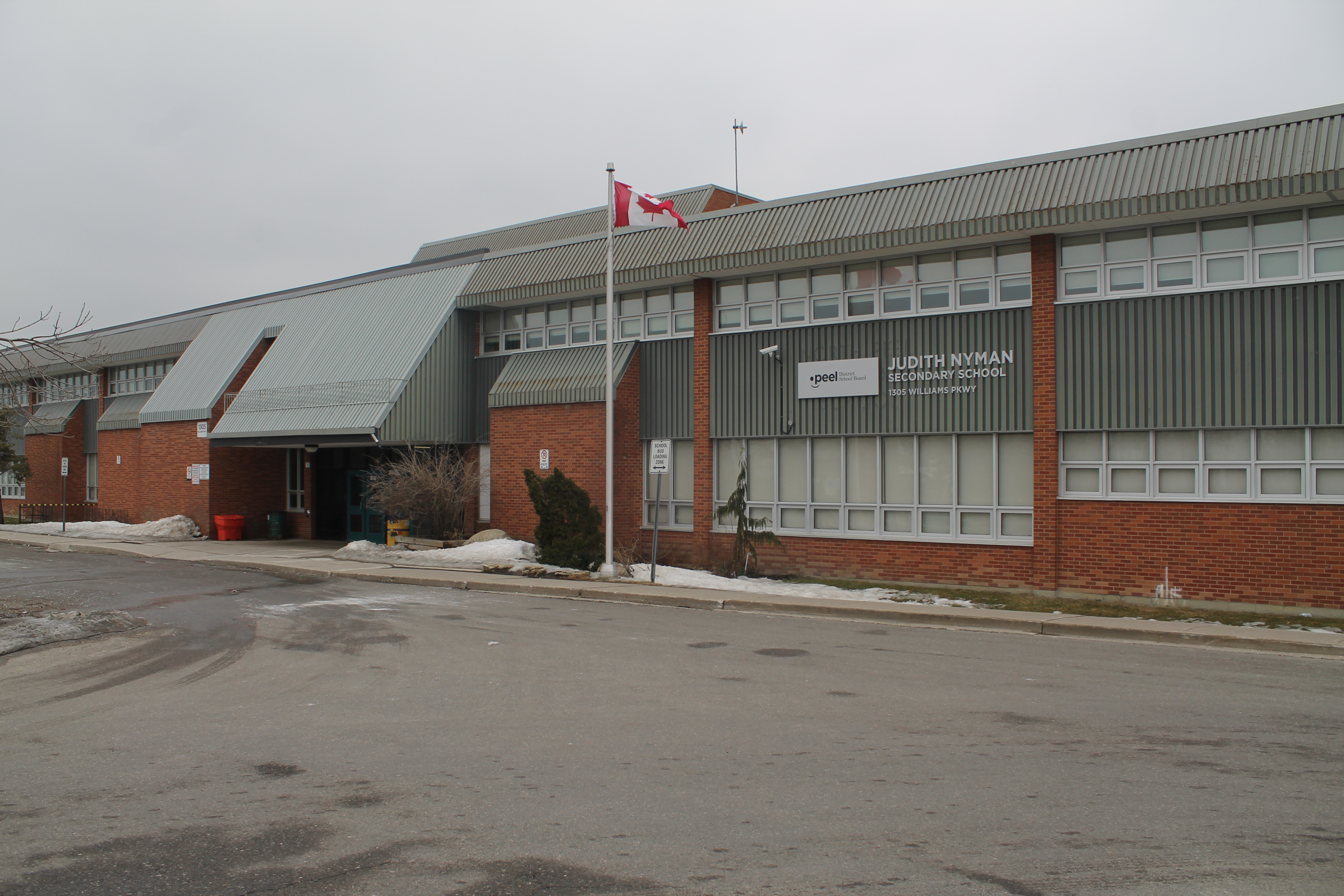

Location
- 1305 Williams Parkway; Brampton, Ontario, L6S 3J8; Canada; 43.73239°N 79.73057°W

Information
- School type: Provincial, Secondary School
- Established: June 1, 1978
- School board: Peel District School Board
- Superintendent: Neerja Punjabi
- Area trustee: Stan Cameron; Suzanne Nurse; Kathy McDonald; Carrie Andrews; Harkirat Singh; David Green
- School number: 930679
- Principal: Dion Neil
- Grades: 9-12
- Enrolment: 700
- Language: English
- Colours: Black and gold
- Mascot: The Hornet
- Team name: Hornets
- Website: www.peelschools.org/schools/judithnyman/

Judith Nyman Secondary School is a high school in Brampton, Ontario, Canada. Is a Regional Skilled Trades Secondary School - it is by application only for all pathways regional skilled trades program.

Upon graduation from Judith Nyman Secondary School, students receive an Ontario Secondary School Diploma or Certificate and may also obtain a Red Seal for Specialist High Skills Major in Construction. It is one of the only schools in Ontario that offers 17 technological trades courses as well as pathways to Workplace an Apprenticeship, college and University.

In 2010, comedian Russell Peters established the Russell Peters North Peel Scholarship, an award worth up to $21,000 and intended to finance up to three years of college. It will be awarded annually to a student from Judith Nyman Secondary School (formerly North Peel) with a strong academic record and the intention of attending college.

== Notable alumni ==
- Russell Peters, comedian and actor

== See also ==
- Education in Ontario
- List of secondary schools in Ontario
