= Turner Fenton Secondary School =

High school in the Peel Region

Coordinates: 43.675384°N 79.719329°W

Location
- 7935 Kennedy Road South; Brampton, Ontario, L6W 0A2; Canada

Information
- School type: High school
- Motto: Remis velisque
- Founded: 1992 merger (1972, 1974)
- School board: Peel District School Board
- Superintendent: Donna Ford
- Area trustee: Kathy McDonald
- School number: 918440
- Principal: Kevin Williams
- Vice principals: Hilary Giles; Sarka Kubelikova; Brianne Manning; Shanae Valor
- Grades: 9-12+
- Enrolment: 1325 (January 22, 2025)
- Language: English, Extended French
- Colours: Royal Blue, Black, White and Silver
- Team name: Trojans
- Newspaper: Turneround (1977–2014); Trojan Times (2014–)
- Endowment: $70K
- Website: turnerfenton.peelschools.org

Turner Fenton Secondary School is a high school in the Peel Region, located in Brampton, Ontario, operated by the Peel District School Board. Turner Fenton Secondary School's name is inherited from two schools that were later merged, which were named after J. A. Turner, the first director of the Peel board, and W. J. Fenton, a pioneer educator.

== Programs ==
Turner Fenton offers the International Baccalaureate (IB) Middle Years Programme (MYP) for grade 9 and 10 students (MYP Year 4 and 5) and the IB Diploma Programme (DP) for grade 11 and 12 students. The MYP, based on similar principles as the DP, is offered as preparation for the DP, requiring students to engage in the study of languages, sciences, mathematics, and humanities. The DP is a globally recognized program that prepares students for university.

== Notable alumni ==
- Charles Allen, Olympic hurdler and sprinter
- Aaron Ashmore, actor (Smallville)
- Shawn Ashmore, actor (X-Men, X2, Terry)
- Navdeep Bains, former Liberal MP for Mississauga—Malton, and Minister of Innovation, Science and Economic Development
- Rupan Bal, Punjabi actor
- Vic Dhillon, former member of Provincial Parliament
- Matt Duchene, NHL Forward, Dallas Stars
- Paul Ferreira, former Member of Provincial Parliament
- Jonita Gandhi, Bollywood singer
- Allison Higson, swimmer and Olympic bronze medallist in the 1988 Seoul Games.
- Rupi Kaur, poet & writer
- Rob Maver, Punter, Calgary Stampeders
- Anna Mather, NDP candidate
- Johnny Reid, country singer
- Jason Spezza, Center, Toronto Maple Leafs
- Courtney Stephen, defensive back, Hamilton Tiger-Cats
- Raffi Torres, Left Wing, Toronto Maple Leafs
- Kate Van Buskirk, cross-country runner
- Roy Woods, musician

== See also ==
- Education in Ontario
- List of secondary schools in Ontario
