= Brampton Centennial Secondary School =

Location
- 251 McMurchy Avenue South; Brampton, Ontario, L6Y 2P8; Canada; 43°40′01″N 79°44′51″W

Information
- School type: Public, high school
- Founded: June 1, 1967
- School board: Peel District School Board
- Superintendent: Adrian Graham
- Area trustee: Kathy McDonald
- School number: 896055
- Principal: Sara Tielli-Mitchell
- Grades: 9-12
- Enrolment: 1475 (November 2023)
- Language: English
- Colours: Red, Yellow and Black
- Mascot: Buck
- Team name: BCSS Bucks
- Website: bramptoncentennial.peelschools.org

Brampton Centennial Secondary School (BCSS) is a public high school located in Brampton, Ontario, Canada and is part of the Peel District School Board. In September 2008, BCSS had 1,775 students.

== History ==
The first secondary school in Brampton opened in 1852 as Brampton High School with three students and its first principal A. Thompson. By 1888 it had an annual budget of $868.25. After a fire, the school building was reconstructed in 1977. Brampton Centennial Secondary School was built in 1967 — the Canadian Centennial year — to replace Brampton High School.

== School shooting ==
On 28 May 1975 Michael Slobodian, a student at the school, brought two rifles to school with the intention of killing two particular teachers and himself. He opened fire, killing one of the teachers and one student, and wounding 13 students before shooting and killing himself. This was only the second high school shooting in Canadian history.

== Athletics ==
Brampton Centennial has many athletics programs which are collectively known by students as "Buckland." The schools sports programs include Football, basketball, curling, swimming, track and field, volleyball, wrestling, hockey, baseball, Fast Pitch, cricket, badminton, lacrosse, rugby and soccer.

=== Recent athletic achievements ===
- Varsity OFSAA Cheerleading Champions (2024)
- South Regionals OFSAA Track and Field Champions (2023)
- Novice male Track & Field ROPSSAA Champions (2023)
- Novice Female Track & Field Champions (2023)
- Senior Boys Basketball ROPSSAA Tier 1 Champions (2019)
- Varsity Boys Rugby ROPSSAA Tier 2 Champions (2018)
- Junior Boys Volleyball ROPSSAA Tier 2 Champions (2018)
- Junior Boys Basketball ROPSSAA TIER I Champions (2017)
- Junior Boys Basketball ROPSSAA TIER I Champions (2011)
- Girls Overall First in ROPSSAA Wrestling (2008)
- Wrestling team won ROPSSAA Championship (2006)
- Two consecutive undefeated Junior Boys Rugby regular seasons (2005-2007)
- Reigning Varsity Boys Lacrosse Three-peat Champions (2004-2007)
- Peel Secondary School Athletic Association Senior Football Champions (1995)

== Alumni ==
- Chris Cuthbert - TSN Sports Broadcaster
- Wayne Middaugh - World and Canadian curling champion
- Peter Corner - World and Canadian curling champion
- Rick Nash - NHL player for the New York Rangers
- Scott Thompson of the Kids in the Hall
- Scott Wedgewood - Goalie drafted by the New Jersey Devils in 2010
- Matt Petgrave - Defensive ice hockey player
- Ken Whillans - Former Mayor of Brampton
- Julie White - Olympic high jumper

== Ontario Human Rights Tribunal ==
Former Vice Principal Ranjit Khatkur of South Asian background alleged that her ethnic/racial background was the reason she was overlooked for promotion to principal despite fulfilling all requirements. She launched an Ontario Human Rights Tribunal alleging systematic discrimination in the Peel public board. It eventually culminated in allowing the Turner Consulting Group to release a Research Report on Hiring and Promotion at the Peel District School Board.

== See also ==
- Education in Ontario
- List of secondary schools in Ontario
