= Sandalwood Heights Secondary School =

Location
- 2671 Sandalwood Parkway East; Brampton, Ontario, L6R 0K7; Canada; 43.7659°N 79.7440°W

Information
- School type: Public high school
- Founded: 2007
- School board: Peel District School Board
- Superintendent: Kervin White
- Area trustee: Satpaul Singh Johal
- Principal: Amit Mehrotra
- Grades: 9-12
- Enrolment: 1,004 (September 2025)
- Language: English
- Colours: Maroon, Gold and Black
- Mascot: Sandy the Sabre
- Team name: Sabres
- Website: sandalwoodheights.peelschools.org

Sandalwood Heights Secondary School is a Canadian high school located in the city of Brampton, Ontario and is a part of the Peel District School Board. It opened in 2007. The Specialist High Skills Major program (SHSM) features student pathways in the business sector. Specific details regarding course packages for the SHSM program are available from the counseling office at the school. School partnerships include Humber College, Ryerson University, Magna International, the Region of Peel, Apple Computers, Magnus Inc., and will provide unique cooperative education experiences for Sandalwood students. New starting September 2023, SHSM in Health and Wellness.

== See also ==
- Education in Ontario
- List of secondary schools in Ontario

no
