= Central library =

Central library may refer to:

== Canada ==
- Calgary Central Library, Alberta
- Mississauga Central Library, Ontario
- North York Central Library, Toronto, Ontario
- Halifax Central Library, Nova Scotia

== Denmark ==
- Odense Central Library

== Finland ==
- Helsinki Central Library

== Hong Kong ==
- Hong Kong Central Library

== India ==
- Central Library, IIT, Bombay
- Sayaji Rao Gaekwad Library at Banaras Hindu University, in Varanasi, Uttar Pradesh

== Iran ==
- Central Library of Astan Quds Razavi, in Mashad

== Italy ==
- National Central Library (Florence)
- National Central Library (Rome)

== Japan ==
- Tenri Central Library

== Mexico ==
- Central Library (UNAM), at the National Autonomous University of Mexico

== New Zealand ==
- Christchurch Central Library

== Pakistan ==
- Central Library Bahawalpur

== Singapore ==
- Central Library, NUS, of the National University of Singapore

== South Africa ==
- Central Library Cape Town

== Spain ==
- Central Library of Cantabria

== Switzerland ==
- Zurich Central Library

== Taiwan ==
- National Central Library (Taiwan)

== United Arab Emirates ==
- Dubai Central Library

== United Kingdom ==
=== England ===
- Central Library, Blackpool
- Birkenhead Central Library
- Birmingham Central Library
- Bristol Central Library
- Croydon Central Library
- Derby Central Library
- Islington Central Library
- Kensington Central Library
- Leeds Central Library
- Liverpool Central Library
- Manchester Central Library
- Oxford Central Library
- Reading Central Library
- Sheffield Central Library
- Stockport Central Library

=== Northern Ireland ===
- Belfast Central Library

=== Scotland ===
- Central Library, Aberdeen
- Central Library, Edinburgh

=== Wales ===
- Cardiff Central Library
- Old Swansea Central Library

== United States ==
=== California ===
- Los Angeles Central Library
- Sacramento City Library
- Norman F. Feldheym Central Library, San Bernardino
- San Diego Central Library

=== Florida ===
- Hart Memorial Central Library, Kissimmee

=== Georgia ===
- Atlanta Central Library

=== Indiana ===
- Central Library (Indianapolis)

=== Maryland ===
- NOAA Central Library, in Silver Spring

=== Massachusetts ===
- Central Library (Somerville, Massachusetts)

=== Minnesota ===
- Minneapolis Central Library

=== Missouri ===
- Central Library (Kansas City, Missouri)

=== New York ===
- Central Library (Brooklyn Public Library)

=== Oregon ===
- Central Library (Portland, Oregon)

=== Pennsylvania ===
- Parkway Central Library, Philadelphia

=== Texas ===
- J. Erik Jonsson Central Library, Dallas
- Old Dallas Central Library

=== Wisconsin ===
- Central Library (Milwaukee, Wisconsin)

=== Washington ===
- Seattle Central Library

== See also ==
- State Central Library (disambiguation)
