= Meadowvale =

Meadowvale may refer to:

== Australia ==
- Meadowvale, Queensland, a rural locality in the Bundaberg Region

== Canada ==
- Meadowvale, Ontario, a community of Mississauga, Ontario, Canada
  - Meadowvale (village), a residential subdivision near the community
  - Meadowvale GO Station, a station in the GO Transit network located in the community
  - Meadowvale Secondary School, a high school in the Peel District School Board in Mississauga, Ontario, Canada
  - Meadowvale Town Centre Bus Terminal
- Meadowvale Road, a street in Toronto
