= Tarun Kant =

Indian engineering professor (born 1946)

- Born: 1 July 1946 (age 80); Ballia, Uttar Pradesh, India
- Occupations: Teacher and researcher
- Spouse: Rekha Srivastava
- Children: Devanshu Kant, Vishaal Kant
- Awards: Jawaharlal Nehru Memorial Trust (UK) Scholarship (1979); European Commission Senior Faculty Exchange Fellowship (1992–93); Professor H. H. Mathur Award for Excellence in Research in Applied Sciences (2006); IIT Roorkee-Khosla National Award (2009); IIT Bombay Research Paper Award (2010); IIT Bombay Lifetime Achievement Award (2011); APACM Senior Scientist Award (2013); ICCES Lifetime Achievement Award (2015); BITS Pilani Lifetime Achievement Award (2018); INSA Professor Brahm Prakash Memorial Medal (2019); Vasvik Award for Mechanical & Structural Science and Technology (2020); INAE Professor Jai Krishna Memorial Award (2026)
- Scientific career
- Fields: Civil engineering
- Workplaces: Indian Institute of Technology Bombay; IIT Mandi; IIT Indore; IIT Hyderabad; IIT Patna
- Doctoral advisor: Prof C.K Ramesh

Tarun Kant is a Professor Emeritus at the Indian Institute of Technology Bombay (IIT Bombay) in Mumbai, where he served as Institute Chair Professor from December 2009 to June 2013. He was born on 1 July 1946 in Ballia, Uttar Pradesh, India. He received a BSc degree from Allahabad University in 1962, a B.Tech (Hons.) degree in civil engineering from IIT Bombay in 1967 and an M.Tech in civil engineering, specializing in structural engineering, from the Indian Institute of Technology Kanpur (IIT Kanpur) in 1969. Kant spent about 18 months at a consulting engineering firm in Mumbai before becoming a lecturer at IIT Bombay in January 1971. He received a PhD degree in 1977. Kant became an assistant professor in 1978 and a professor in 1986. At IIT Bombay, he has been a department head (2000–2002), dean of planning (2001–2003) and chair of the Joint Entrance Examination (1998) and the Central Library (1995–1999).

Kant formally retired from IIT Bombay on 30 June 2011 but was re-employed by India's Ministry of Human Resource Development (later renamed the Ministry of Education) until 30 June 2016. He subsequently held the positions of Emeritus Fellow of the Institute (2016), INSA Senior Scientist (2016–2022), Visiting Distinguished Professor at IIT Mandi (2019–2022), Adjunct Professor at IIT Indore (2019–2022), Honorary Professor at IIT Hyderabad (2019–2021), Adjunct Professor at IIT Hyderabad (2021–2024), and Visiting Professor at IIT Patna (2025–2026). IIT Bombay conferred on him the title of Professor Emeritus for life on 27 September 2017. A Prof. Tarun Kant Endowed Chair was established in the Department of Civil Engineering at IIT Bombay in his honour on 19 March 2020, funded through contributions from his former students, industry associates and his own personal donation.

Kant was elected a fellow of the Indian National Academy of Engineering in 1999, the Indian Academy of Sciences in 2004, the Indian National Science Academy (INSA) in 2007 and the National Academy of Sciences, India in 2011. He is the first civil engineer to be elected to all four national academies, and the fourth civil engineer to be elected to the two national science academies (INSA and IASc). He is also a Fellow of the Institution of Engineers (India) and the Aeronautical Society of India, and holds memberships in several other Indian and international professional and technical societies. Kant has been a visiting professor at the University of Wales, Swansea (1979–82), the University of Cambridge (1993) and the University of California, Los Angeles (2005).

A recipient of the Burmah-Shell Best Paper Prize, he was awarded the 1979 Jawaharlal Nehru Memorial Trust (UK) Scholarship and the 1992–93 European Commission (EC) Senior Faculty Exchange Fellowship by the Government of India. On 13 March 2007, IIT Bombay gave Kant its 2006 Professor H. H. Mathur Award for Excellence in Research in Applied Sciences in recognition of his work in the mechanics of composite materials and structures during the institute's Foundation Day celebrations. He also received the 2009 IIT Roorkee-Khosla National Award for lifetime achievement in the field of engineering. He received the 2010 IIT Bombay Research Paper Award, presented during Teachers' Day celebrations in 2011, and on 4 April 2012 the institute gave him its 2011 Lifetime Achievement Award. In 2013, the 17th International Conference on Composite Structures (ICCS17) in Porto, Portugal recognised Kant, together with Romesh Batra and J. N. Reddy, with the title of "legend and pioneer" in the mechanics of composites. He received the APACM Senior Scientist Award from the Asia Pacific Association for Computational Mechanics in 2013, the ICCES Lifetime Achievement Medal in 2015, and a Lifetime Achievement Award from the Birla Institute of Technology and Science, Pilani in 2018. In 2019 he received the Indian National Science Academy's Professor Brahm Prakash Memorial Medal, delivering the associated institute lecture, "Evolution of Macro-Mechanics of Laminated Composites," on Engineers' Day (15 September) 2021, and in 2020 the Vasvik Award for Mechanical & Structural Science and Technology.

Kant has published 167 research papers in peer-reviewed journals, seven chapters in edited books, about 185 papers in conference proceedings, and has edited six books; he serves on the editorial boards of five international journals: Structural Engineering & Mechanics - An International Journal (Techno-Press), the International Journal for Computational Methods in Engineering Science and Mechanics (Taylor & Francis), Computer Modeling in Engineering & Sciences (Tech Science Press), Advances in Civil Engineering (Hindawi Publishing) and the International Journal of Computational Methods (World Scientific). He served a term on the editorial board of Computational Mechanics – An International Journal, has supervised 28 PhD theses and more than 77 M.Tech and 90 B.Tech dissertations, and has refereed more than 100 external PhD theses. As of 18 September 2026, his published work had received more than 10,800 citations on Google Scholar, with an h-index of 52.

He established a research school of computational structural mechanics at IIT Bombay. Kant served two terms as president of the Indian Society of Theoretical and Applied Mechanics (1999 and 2000), founded the Indian Association for Computational Mechanics (IndACM) and the Indian Association for Structural Engineering (IASE), and organizes the biennial ICCMS (International Congress on Computational Mechanics and Simulation) and SEC (Structural Engineering Convention) congresses in India. He was an INSA-nominated member of the National Committee of International Union of Theoretical & Applied Mechanics (IUTAM) for two three-year terms: July 2000-June 2003 and January 2008-December 2011, and was a member of the IUTAM General Assembly until 2012. Kant is chair and a member of the engineering and technology sections of INSA and IASc, respectively, and served a further three-year term as an INSA Council Member (2020–2022). In 2018, following a sustained decade-long effort, he helped establish the Centre for Computational Engineering and Science at IIT Bombay, an interdisciplinary research facility supported by a grant of about ₹10 crore from the Department of Atomic Energy through the Board of Research in Nuclear Sciences. In 2016 he delivered a semi-plenary talk at the WCCM-APCOM conference in Seoul, South Korea.

== Education ==
Qualification	Year	Institution
High School	1958	Queen's College, Varanasi (Uttar Pradesh Board)
Intermediate	1960	King Edward Government Inter College, Deoria (Uttar Pradesh Board)
BSc	1962	Allahabad University (Physics, Chemistry and Mathematics)
BTech (Hons.)	1967	IIT Bombay (Civil Engineering)
MTech	1969	IIT Kanpur (Structural Engineering)
PhD	1977	IIT Bombay (thesis: "Thick Elastic Shells")

== Employment ==
Period	Position
March 1969 – August 1969	Research Assistant, IIT Kanpur
August 1969 – January 1971	Senior Design Engineer-cum-Programmer, Builders' Associates (Consulting Engineers), Bombay
January 1971 – May 1978	Lecturer, IIT Bombay
May 1978 – May 1986	Assistant Professor, IIT Bombay
October 1979 – September 1982	Visitor, University of Wales, Swansea, UK
May 1986 – June 2011	Professor, IIT Bombay
February 1993 – September 1993	Visiting Professor, University of Cambridge, UK
July 2005 – December 2005	Visiting Professor, University of California, Los Angeles, USA
December 2009 – June 2013	Institute Chair Professor, IIT Bombay
July 2011 – June 2016	Professor (re-employed by the Government of India), IIT Bombay
July 2016 – December 2016	Emeritus Fellow, IIT Bombay
December 2016 – June 2022	INSA Senior Scientist
September 2017 – present	Professor Emeritus (honorary), IIT Bombay
2 September 2019 – 1 September 2022	Visiting Distinguished Professor, IIT Mandi
26 March 2019 – 25 March 2021	Honorary Professor, IIT Hyderabad
2019 – 2022	Adjunct Professor, IIT Indore
2021 – 2024	Adjunct Professor, IIT Hyderabad
1 July 2025 – 30 June 2026	Visiting Professor, IIT Patna

=== Major administrative responsibilities ===
- Chairman, Joint Entrance Examination 1998 (JEE-98) (June 1997 – September 1998)
- Chairman, Central Library Committee (1995–1999)
- Head of Department, Civil Engineering (8 March 2000 – 18 January 2002)
- Dean (Planning) of the Institute (18 December 2001 – 3 December 2003)

== Government committee memberships ==
- Member, High-Rise Committee, Government of Maharashtra (June 2007 – June 2010)
- Member, State Expert Appraisal Committee (SEAC), Environment Department, Government of Maharashtra, representing the Ministry of Environment and Forest (MoEF), Government of India (from 7 July 2011)
- Member, Joint Technical Committee constituted by the Government of Maharashtra (Resolution No. ENV-2011/CR-55/TC3, dated 30 June 2011) on the feasibility study for the western coastal road in Mumbai (July 2011 – December 2011)
- Member, Building Sub-Committee, Reserve Bank of India (2013–2017)

== Fellowships and memberships ==
Year	Fellowship / membership	Scope
1999	Elected Fellow, Indian National Academy of Engineering (INAE)	National
2004	Elected Fellow, Indian Academy of Sciences (IASc)	National
2007	Elected Fellow, Indian National Science Academy (INSA)	National
2011	Elected Fellow, National Academy of Sciences, India (NASI)	National
—	Fellow, Institution of Engineers (India) (FIE)	National
—	Fellow, The Aeronautical Society of India (FAeSI)	National
—	Fellow, Indian Association for Structural Engineering (FIASE)	National
—	Fellow, Indian Association for Computational Mechanics (FIndACM)	National
—	Fellow, World Innovation Foundation	International
—	Member, Indian Society of Theoretical and Applied Mechanics (MISTAM)	National
—	Member, Indian Society for Technical Education (MISTE)	National
—	Member, International Society for Computational Engineering and Science (MISCES)	International

== Books ==
- Finite Elements in Computational Mechanics (ed.), Pergamon Press, Oxford, 1985 (ISBN 978-0-08-031682-6)
- Advances in Structural Engineering (co-ed.), Quest Publications, Mumbai, 2000 (ISBN 81-87099-08-9)
- "Computational Mechanics" (thematic issue, ed.), Proceedings of the Indian National Science Academy, Vol. 82(2), June 2016

== Personal life ==
As of 2026, Kant resides in Hyderabad with his wife, Rekha Srivastava, a retired teacher at Kendriya Vidyalaya, IIT Powai. The couple have two sons, Devanshu Kant and Vishaal Kant.
