= Courtneypark Library =

Library in Ontario, Canada

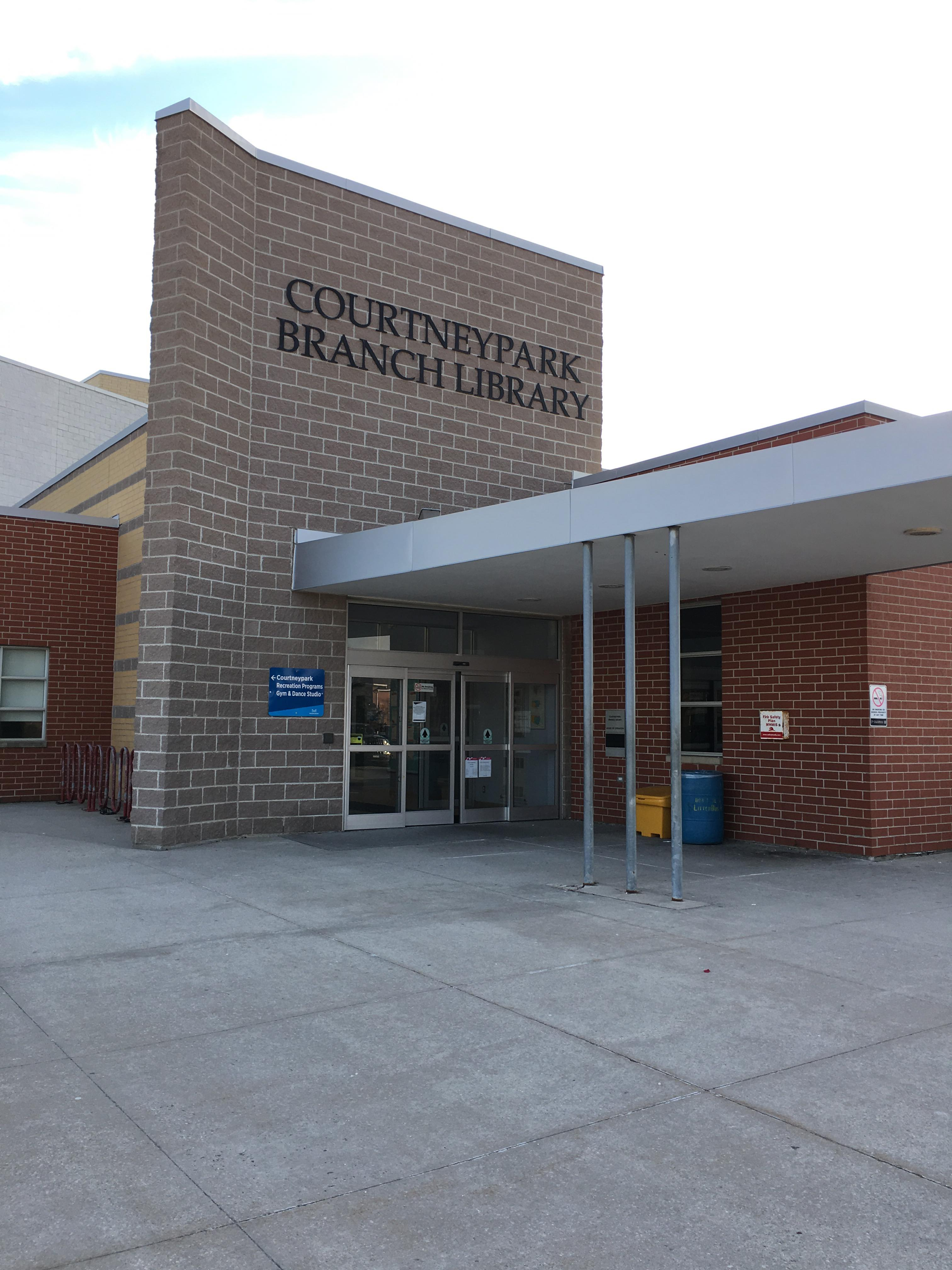
- Front of Courtneypark Library
- 43°37′25.46″N 79°42′36.29″W
- Location: Meadowvalle Village, Canada
- Type: Public Library
- Established: 2004
- Service area: Mississauga
- Branch of: Mississauga Library System

Other information
- Website: www.mississauga.ca/portal/residents/courtneyparklibrary

Courtneypark Library is a library branch under the Mississauga Library System located in Meadowvalle Village. The library was established in late 2004 to respond to the needs of the large and growing Courtneypark community of 75,000 residents. The Courtneypark Library serves as both a community library with resources and programs geared to the everyday requirements of all ages of users, and a school library for St. Marcellinus Secondary School. This library is a shared facility between the City of Mississauga and the Dufferin-Peel Catholic District School Board.

The building is also an Active Living Centre including amenities such as a triple gymnasium, a multi-purpose room, and a dance studio. Recreation & Parks programming at the facility includes yoga, pilates, karate, volleyball, badminton, basketball, tennis, soccer, track and field.

== Gallery ==
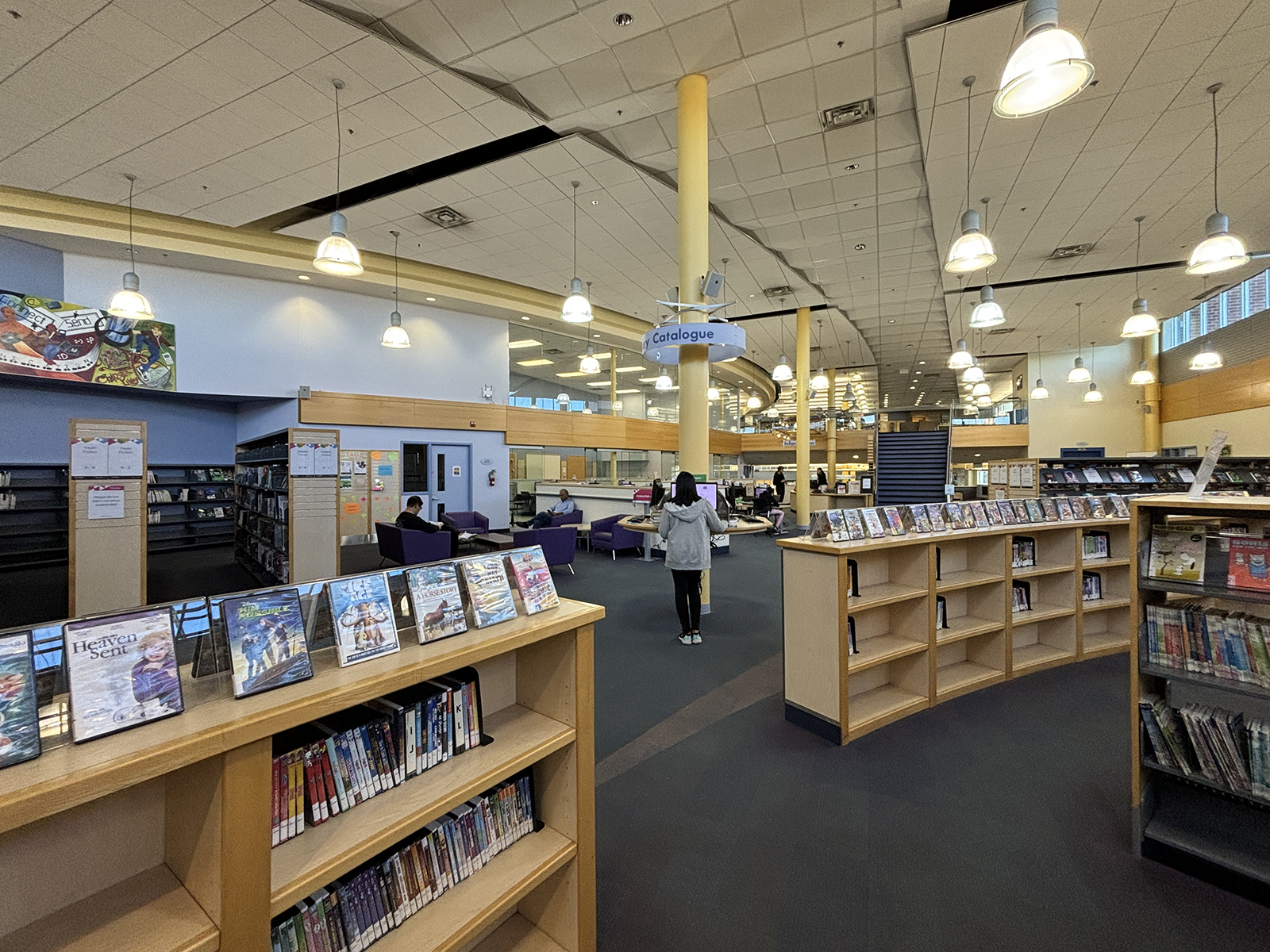
Library interior as of January 2023
