= Meadowvale, Mississauga =

Meadowvale
- Suburban district
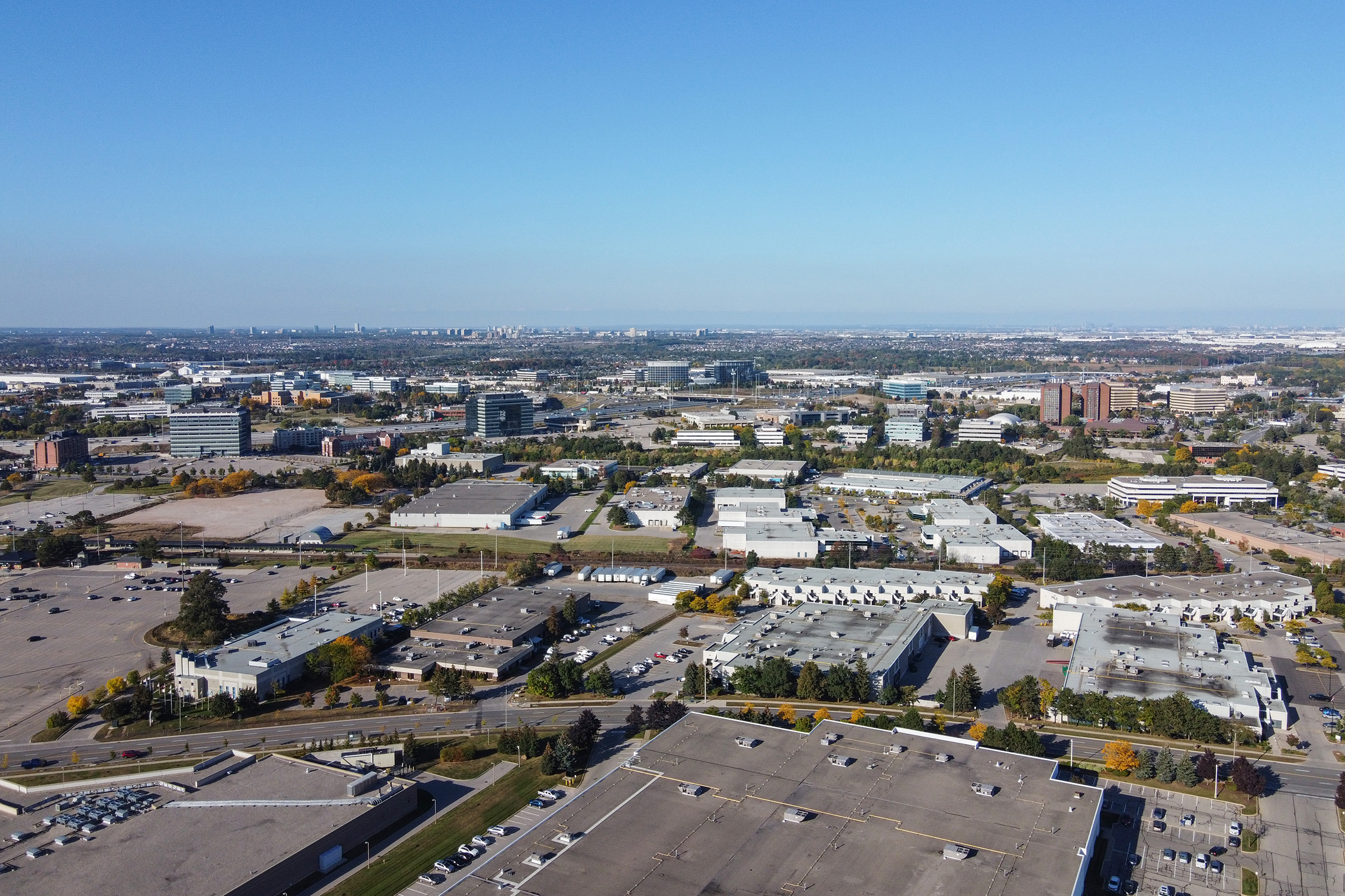
- Mississauga Road overpass at Highway 401, in the industrial area of Meadowvale.
- Interactive map of Meadowvale
- Coordinates: 43°35′05″N 79°45′20″W
- Province: Ontario
- Regional municipality: Peel
- City: Mississauga
- Postal code: L5N
- NTS Map: 030M12
- GNBC Code: FDHXD

Meadowvale is a large suburban district located in the northwestern part of Mississauga, Ontario, Canada, just west of Toronto. In the 19th and early 20th centuries, Meadowvale Village in Toronto Township was established nearby and named for the meadows along the Credit River. In the 1970s the area to the west of the village (actually a hamlet) was selected to be the site of a "new town" for the newly (1974) incorporated City of Mississauga and took the Meadowvale name, while "Village" was added to the historic community. This newer section comprises the bulk of the district today. Meadowvale borders the neighbourhoods of Lisgar to the west, Streetsville and Erin Mills to the south, Churchill Meadows to the southwest, and the City of Brampton to the north.

== Geography ==
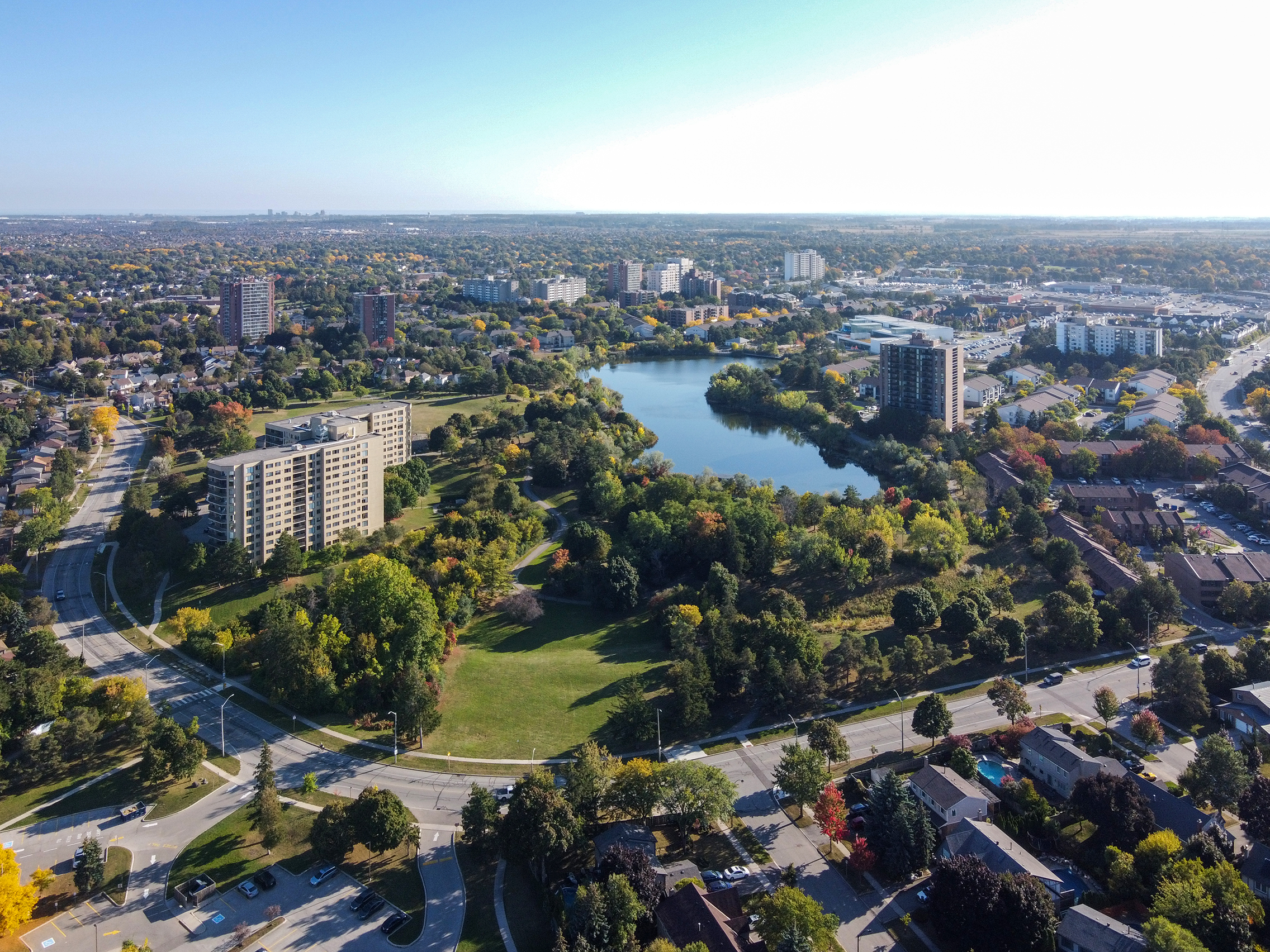
Lake Aquitaine Park

Meadowvale is located at 43°35′05″N 79°45′20″W. The community is situated near the Credit River which lies to the east. Mixed forest is located along the Credit River valley which covers most of the central part of the district. Another creek named Levi Creek runs to the south and southwest and is a tributary of the Credit lying to the south.

The rough boundaries of Meadowvale are: Ninth Line, Mavis Road, Highway 407, Britannia Road.

Meadowvale has two lakes, Aquitaine and Wabukayne, both of which were largely man-made. A system of parks and trails connects the two lakes, which are located about 1.5 kilometres apart.

== Demographics ==
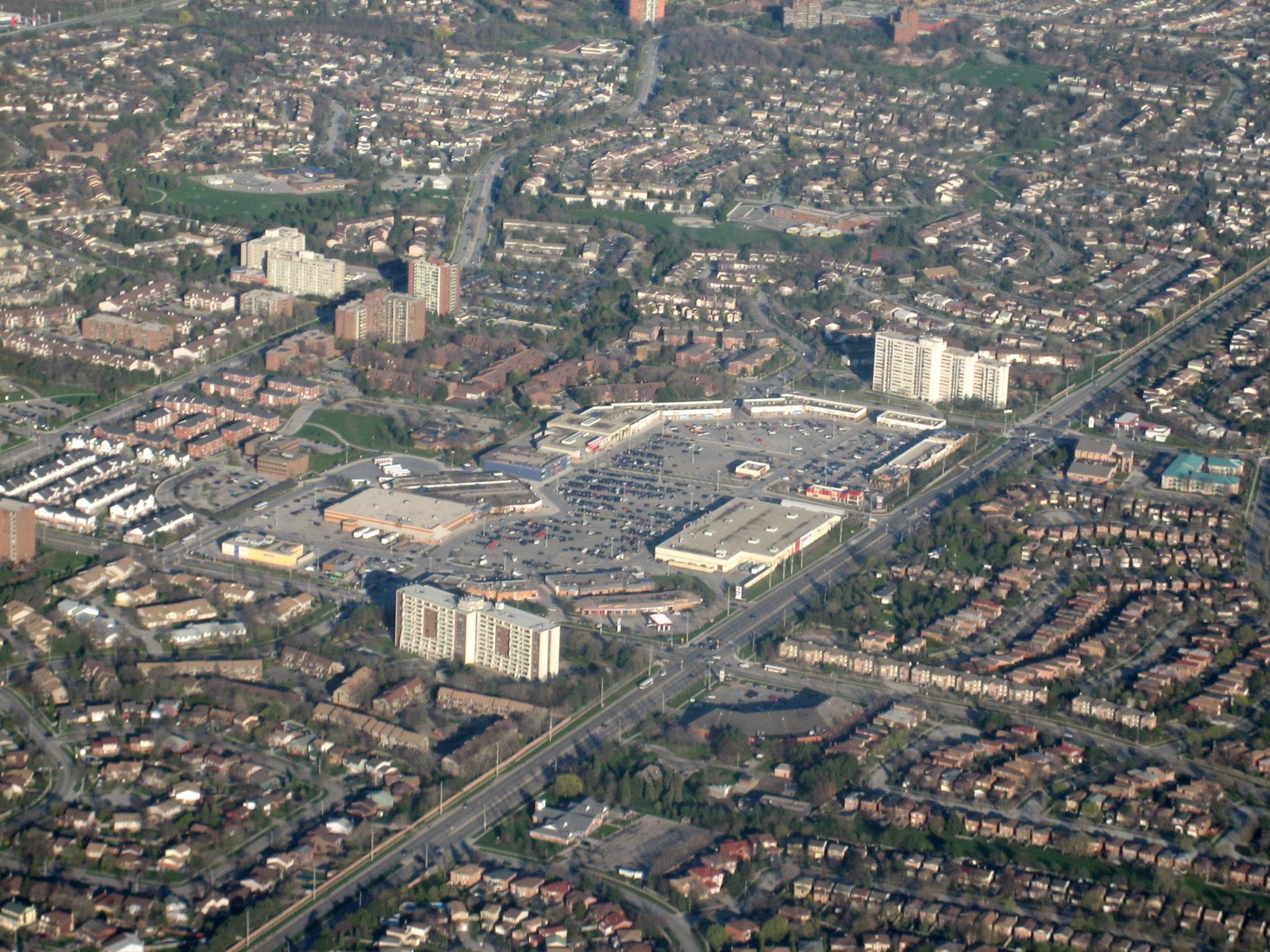
Meadowvale Town Centre

- Population of Meadowvale as a whole
  - 1996: 63,095
  - 2001: 84,225
  - 2006: 99,700 (estimated population)
  - 2009: 104,540
- For planning purposes the city of Mississauga is divided into 24 districts. Here are the estimated 2009 populations for districts which comprise the area known as Meadowvale.
  - Meadowvale 43,500
  - Lisgar 34,500
  - Meadowvale Village 26,500
- Percentage visible minority population
  - 1996: 22.6%
  - 2001: 31.6%
  - 2009: 46.6%
- Breakdown of visible minority population as of 2009
  - South Asian 24.3%
  - Black 11.7%
  - Chinese 6.4%
  - Filipino 5.2%
  - Arab/West Asian 3.8%
  - Latin American 3.2%

== History ==
=== Meadowvale Village ===
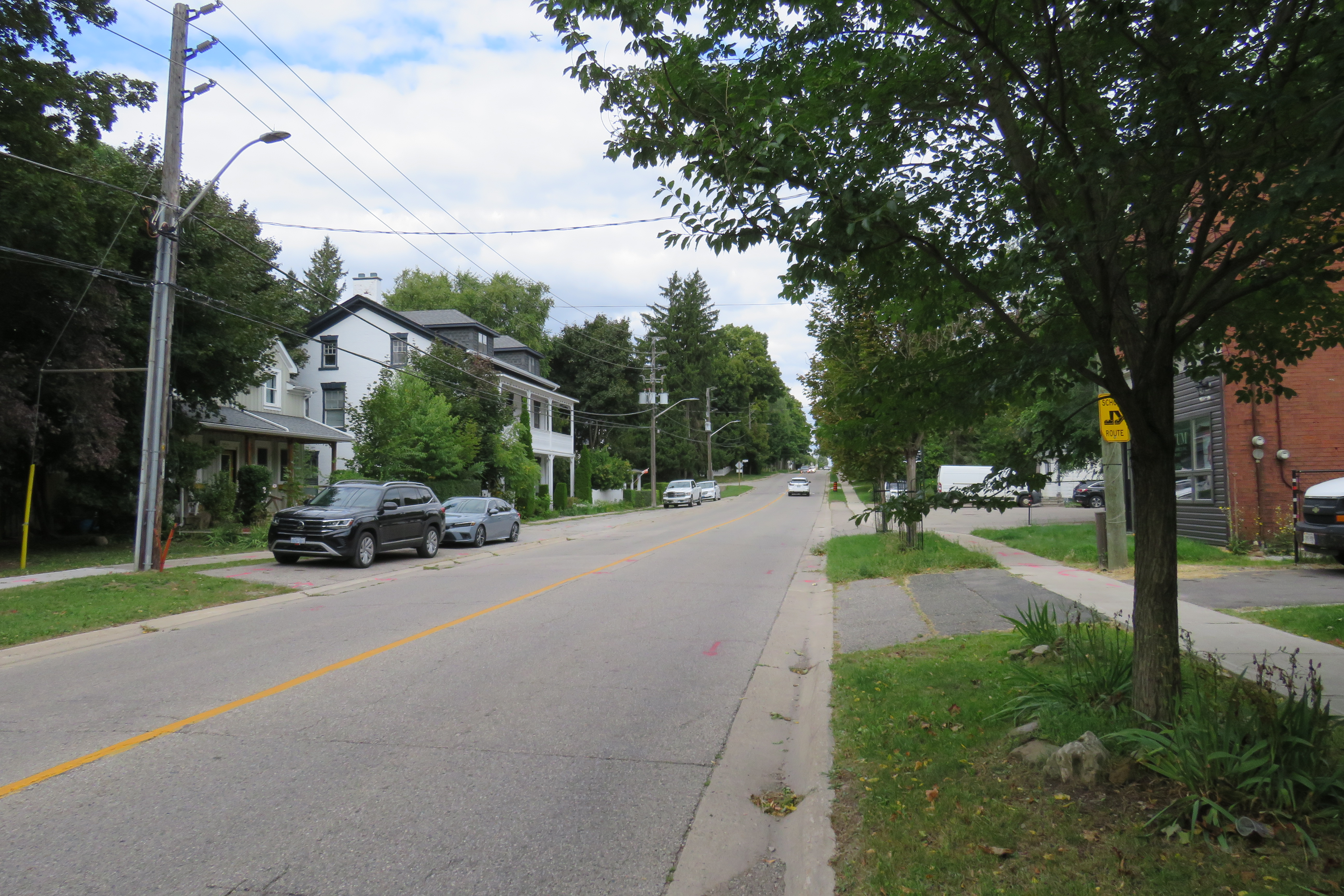
Historic Meadowvale Village

Meadowvale Village was established in 1819 by Irish immigrants from New York State state led by John Beatty. In the village's early years, the main industry was milling, with the mills drawing power from the Credit River. Gooderham and Worts owned and operated many businesses in the village in the 1860s and 1870s, including a mill.

The historic village was named for the meadows in the wide Credit River valley. The village was frequented by Group of Seven artists A.Y. Jackson and A.J. Casson whom painted nearby scenes. Casson frequented the area as his grandmother lived in the community.

In recognition of its many historical buildings, Meadowvale Village was recognized as Ontario’s first Heritage Conservation District in 1980. To eliminate through-traffic in the village, a new Derry Road bypass was opened in 1994. Located about one kilometre north of the original route (Old Derry Road), the new route runs between Mississauga and Mavis Roads.

The village remains and is well preserved, including the Old Derry Road Bridge over Credit River, Commercial Hotel (c. 1850s, and now a private residence), Millworker Houses, Meadowvale Village Hall (old school house c. 1871) and Exous Apostolic Church (former United Church) on Second Line West. Also, as the village is partially situated in the floodplain of the Credit (which is unusually wide in the vicinity), where development is prohibited, there is a sizeable swathe of preserved rural land immediately to the west, extending to south of Highway 401.

=== Meadowvale ===
The modern community of Meadowvale was created to the west, beyond the floodplain. The multi-lane, controlled access MacDonald-Cartier Freeway (Highway 401), was opened south of Meadowvale Village in 1959. In 1968, Meadowvale was incorporated into the new Town of Mississauga. In the 1970s, farmland west of the original Meadowvale Village was developed into a series of subdivisions that make up much of present-day Meadowvale. This area continued to expand, and now fills most of the northwest corner of Mississauga.

Meadowvale is home to the largest business park area in Mississauga along the Highway 401 corridor, where numerous major corporations have located their offices, factories and research and development facilities, including:

- Wal-Mart Canada - Retailer
- Chrysler Canada - Automotive
- Siemens - Electronics
- GlaxoSmithKline - Pharmaceuticals
- Magna International - Auto Parts
- Microsoft - Software
- Tech Data - Computer parts Distributor
- Biovail - Bio-medical
- DuPont - Chemicals
- Fujitsu - Computer
- Mitutoyo - Measuring Equipment
- Sandvik - Materials and Metallurgy
- FANUC Robotics - CNC controllers
- Snap-on - Tools
- Purolator Courier - Courier
- Royal Bank of Canada - Bank
- Maple Leaf Foods - Food Manufacturer
- Tech Data - IT Components Distributor
- Mary Kay - Cosmetics
- Royal LePage - Real Estate
- D-Link - Computer/Networking Parts
- Vivid Entertainment - Adult Services
- Ashley Madison - Dating Website
- Cascades - Packaging
- Bureau Veritas - Food Quality Assessment

In June 2006, Meadowvale found itself in an international media spotlight, as a number of former Meadowvale Secondary School students were among those charged in an alleged terror plot to bomb well-known Canadian buildings and assassinate political leaders.

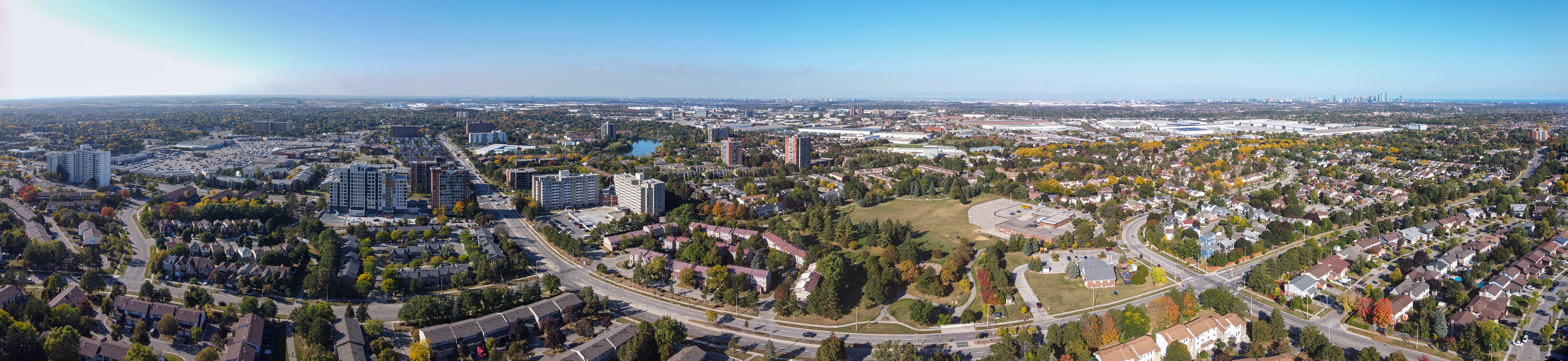
Aerial view of Meadowvale in 2023

== Transportation ==
=== Freeway ===
Meadowvale is accessed via Highway 401 via Winston Churchill Boulevard, Mississauga Road, or Mavis Road. The tolled Highway 407 bypasses Meadowvale along its western and northern borders.

=== Major thoroughfares ===
Winston Churchill Blvd, Erin Mills Parkway and Mavis Road are major north-south roads that connect Meadowvale to the rest of Mississauga and neighbouring Brampton. Derry and Britannia Roads are major east-west roads.

=== Interurban transit ===
Meadowvale GO Station serves as a hub for GO Transit operations. It is an intersection point for GO Transit in the north west of the GTA. The station is serviced by one rail/bus line and three bus lines. The station offers express hourly service to the two largest transit hubs in the GTA, York University and Union Station.

- The station is located along the Milton Line rail line, which offers rush hour train service to downtown in the morning and from downtown in the evening. Bus service is provided for the reverse-commuter and during non-rush hour periods.
- York University Express along Highway 407. With some service via Bramalea GO Station and Highway 407 & Hurontario.
- Milton 401 service - Milton via Meadowvale to Yorkdale and Finch Terminal.
- University of Guelph Service to York University via Meadowvale, Highway 407 & Hurontario and Bramalea GO Station.

GO Transit buses arriving from Milton, pass by Meadowvale Town Centre on their way to Meadowvale GO Station.

MiWay offers a shuttle bus service to and from Meadowvale GO Station during rush hour.

Lisgar GO Station, which opened in September 2007, provides service to commuters living in newly developed areas in the western portion of Meadowvale. Construction of a GO Transit bus garage at Alpha Mills Road and Mississauga Road has also been proposed. (completed in 2009)

=== Local transit ===
Meadowvale Town Centre Transit Terminal is MiWay's third largest terminal. It is the second largest in Mississauga, after the main terminal, Square One.

MiWay offers local transit, as well as service to Kipling Subway Station and Square One.

Pearson Airport is serviced indirectly via either the 42 Derry Road bus or Square One bus terminal.

Lisgar GO station is served by both Brampton Transit and Milton Transit.

=== Trails ===
Meadowvale also has a series of bike and walking trails, offering access to, among other things, schools, parks, the Meadowvale Town Centre and the Meadowvale Community Centre.

== Sports and Recreation ==
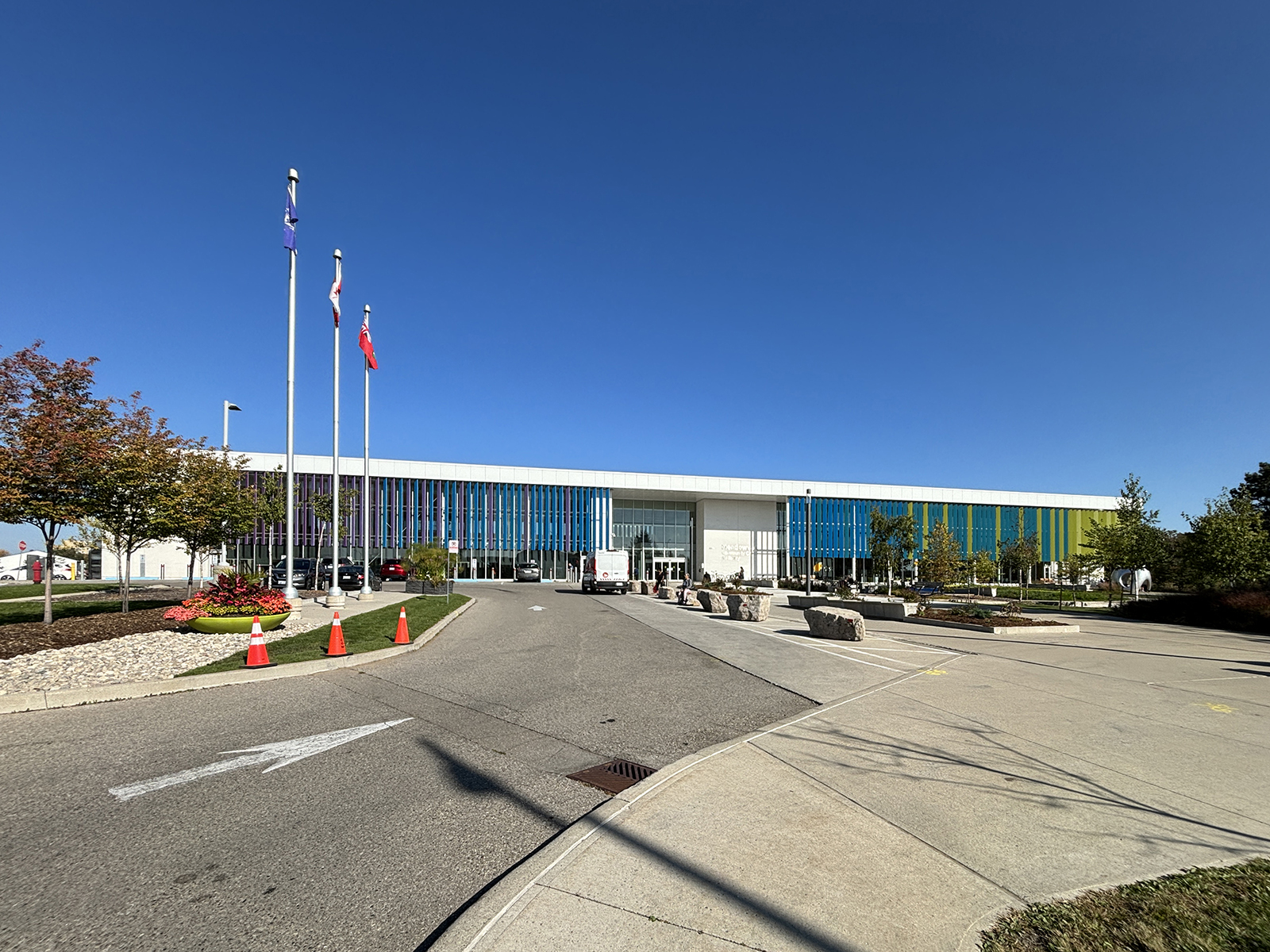
The Meadowvale Community Centre was renovated in July 2014 and re-opened in fall 2016

Meadowvale is the former home to Burlington Twins of the Intercounty Baseball League from 2009-2010 before moving to Burlington. Meadowvale is also home to the minor hockey team the "Meadowvale Hawks", which is part of the Mississauga Hockey League (MHL). In 2016, after two years of construction, and at a cost $37 million, the Meadowvale Community Centre re-opened. This provided Meadowvale residents with access to fitness facilities, a library, a pool, and meeting areas. The community centre is located on the shore of Lake Aquitaine.

== Notable people from or residing in Meadowvale ==
- Billy Talent band members Ian D'Sa, Aaron Solowoniuk, Benjamin Kowalewicz, and Jonathan Gallant.
- Joel Gibb, lead vocalist of the indie pop band The Hidden Cameras
- Maitreyi Ramakrishnan, Tamil Canadian actress.
- Jackson Tomlinson, Former Special Olympics Ontario Short-track speed skater, Gold Medalist at the 2020 Thunder Bay and 2024 Calgary Winter Games

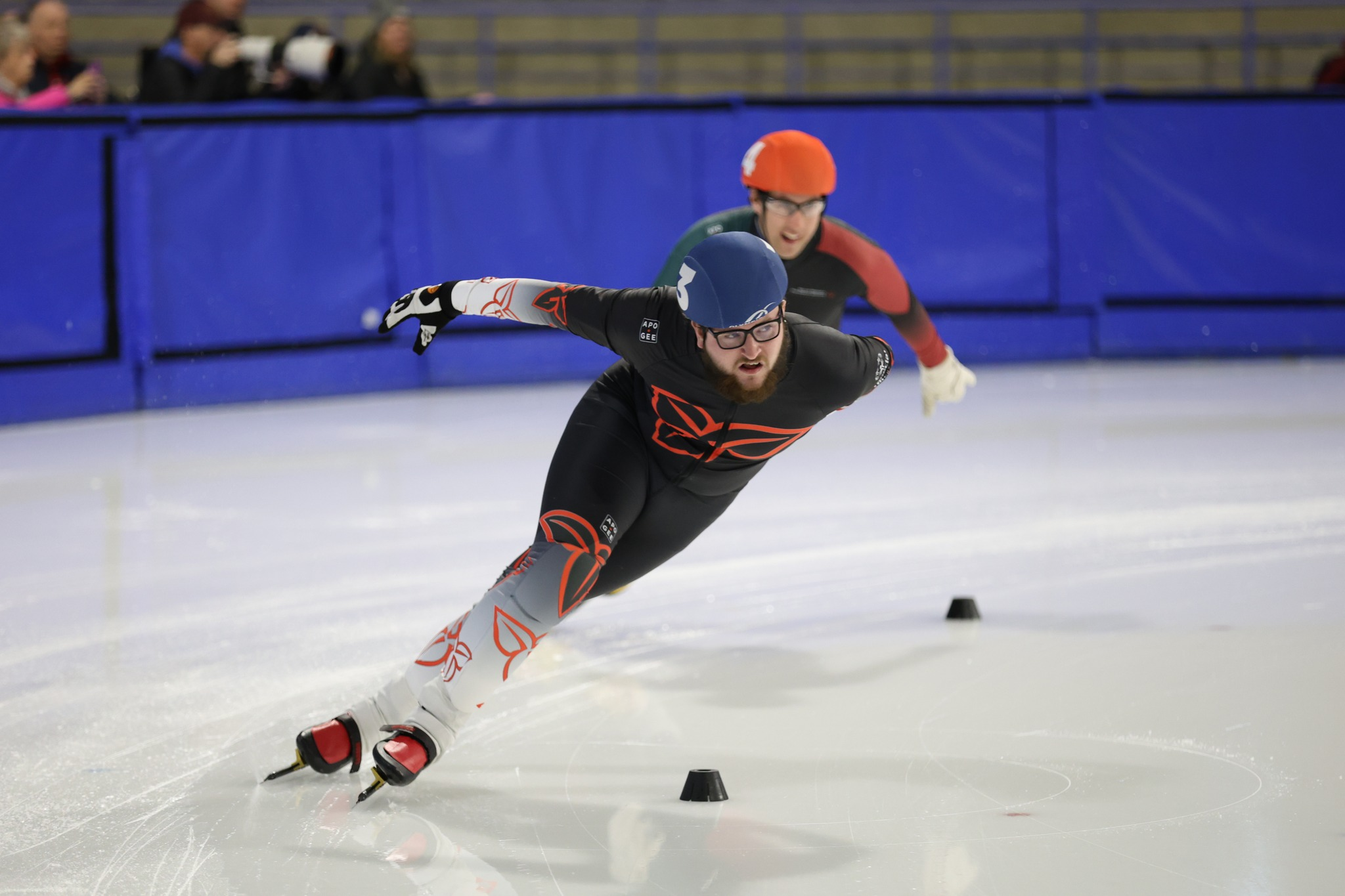
Tomlinson in 2024, mid-corner at the 2024 Special Olympics Canada Calgary Winter Games, located at the Olympic Oval at the University of Calgary

• Adam Pavao New Look (band)
