= Meadowvale Community Centre and Library =

Library in Mississauga, Canada

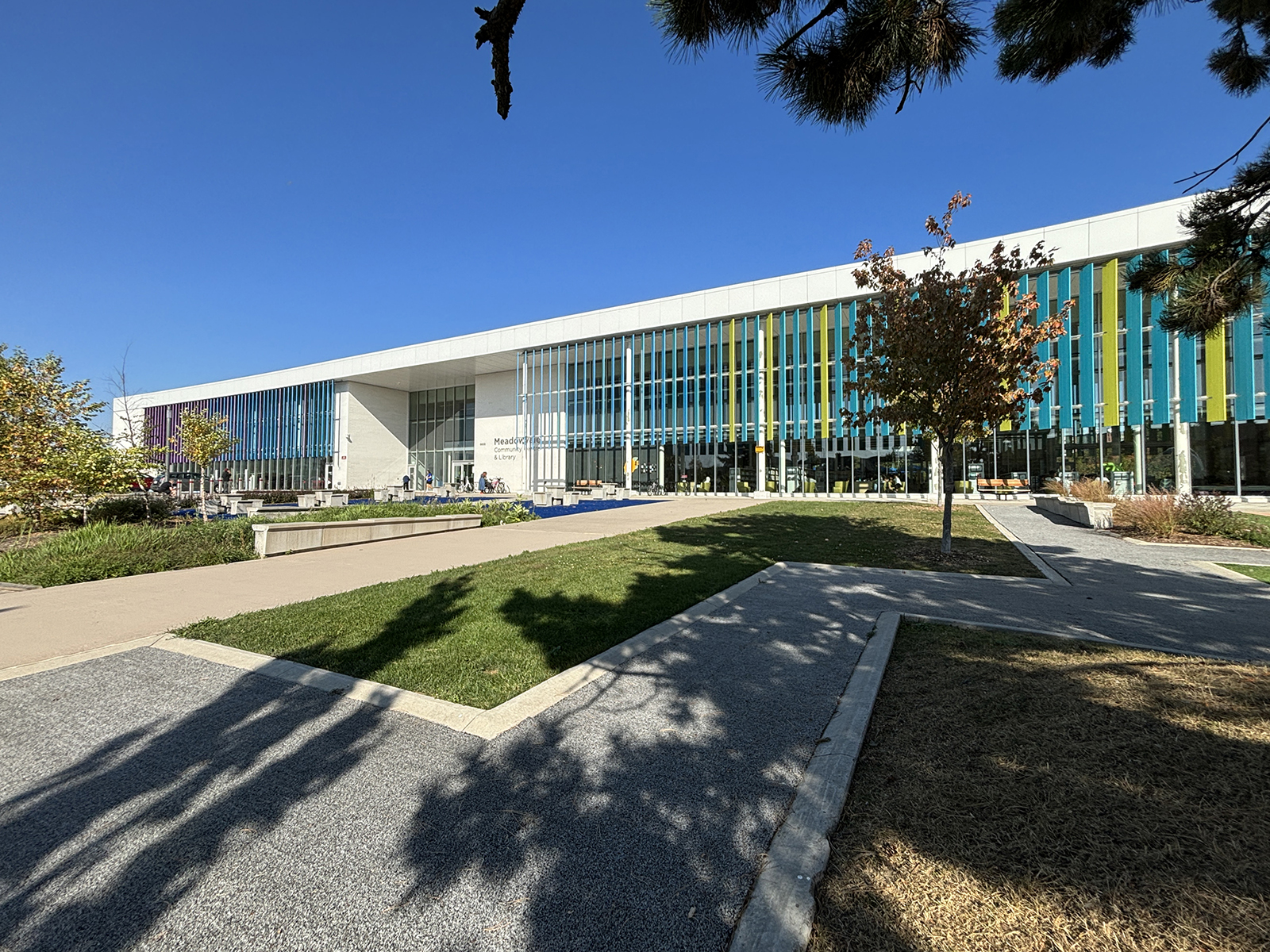
- Front of Meadowvale Community Centre & Library
- 43°35′6.96″N 79°45′22.48″W
- Location: Mississauga, Ontario, Canada
- Type: Public Library, Community Centre
- Established: January 1982, reopened in 2016
- Service area: Meadowvale
- Branch of: Mississauga Library System

Other information
- Website: www.mississauga.ca/portal/residents/meadowvale

Meadowvale Community Centre and Library is a library branch under the Mississauga Library System and a community centre located in the Meadowvale neighbourhood of Mississauga, Ontario. The Meadowvale Community Centre was officially opened in January 1982. The original building was 43,500 square feet, including a pool, fitness centre with racquetball and squash courts, meetings rooms (including a large auditorium) and lobby space.

In 2014, the community centre was closed for redevelopment by the City of Mississauga. The redevelopment of Meadowvale Community Centre was a priority for the City with an estimated budget of $37 million (CDN). The demolition and rebuilding of the centre were aimed to improve public accessibility, update mechanical systems, enlarge program space and add a therapeutic pool in response to the changing recreational needs of the community. The redevelopment was also an opportunity to incorporate the Meadowvale Library into this expanding facility.

The Meadowvale Community Centre and Library were re-opened in September 2016 after 2 years of construction. It is the City of Mississauga's first Community Centre to pursue a LEED certification (silver).

== Gallery ==
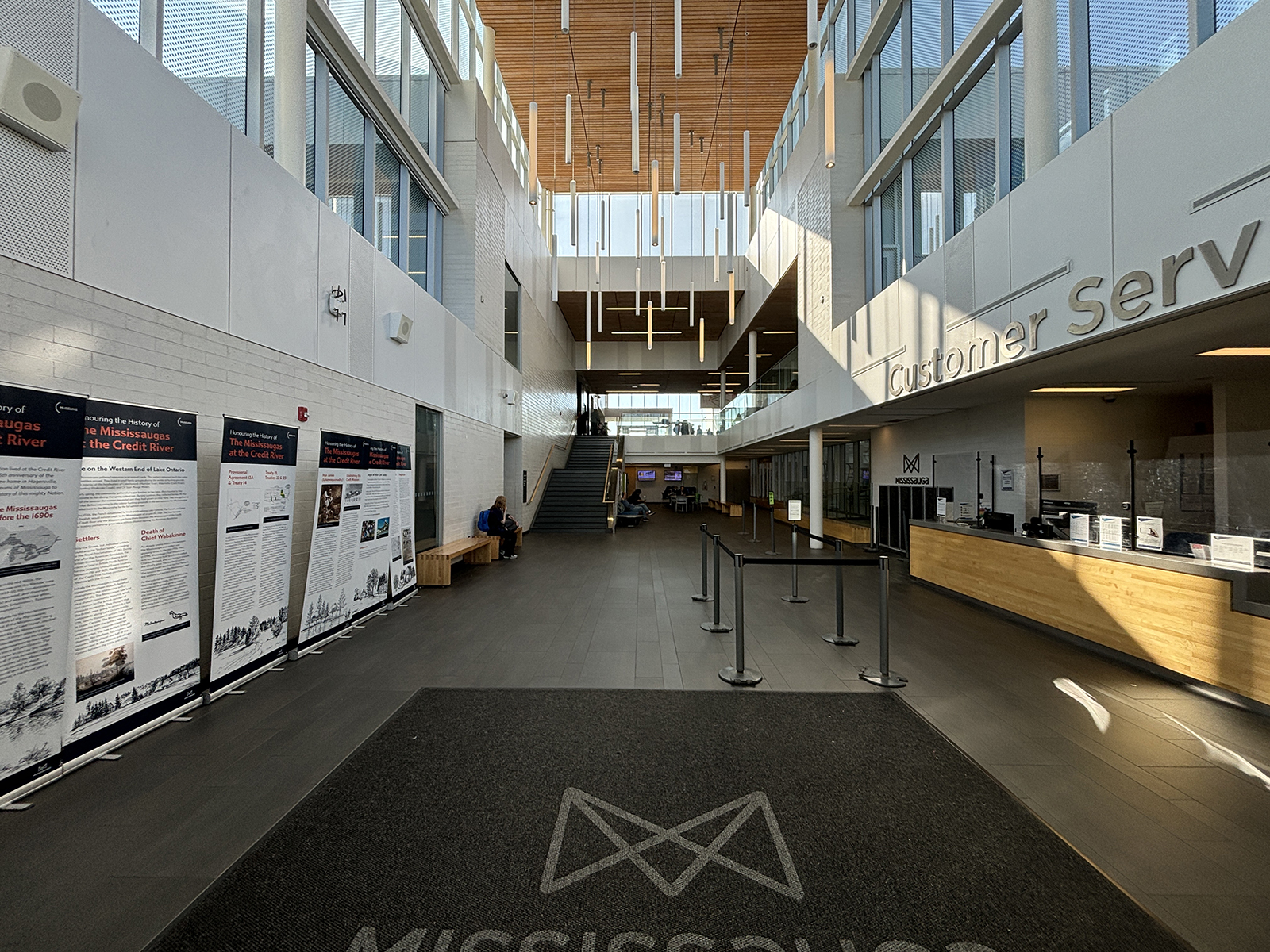
Lobby

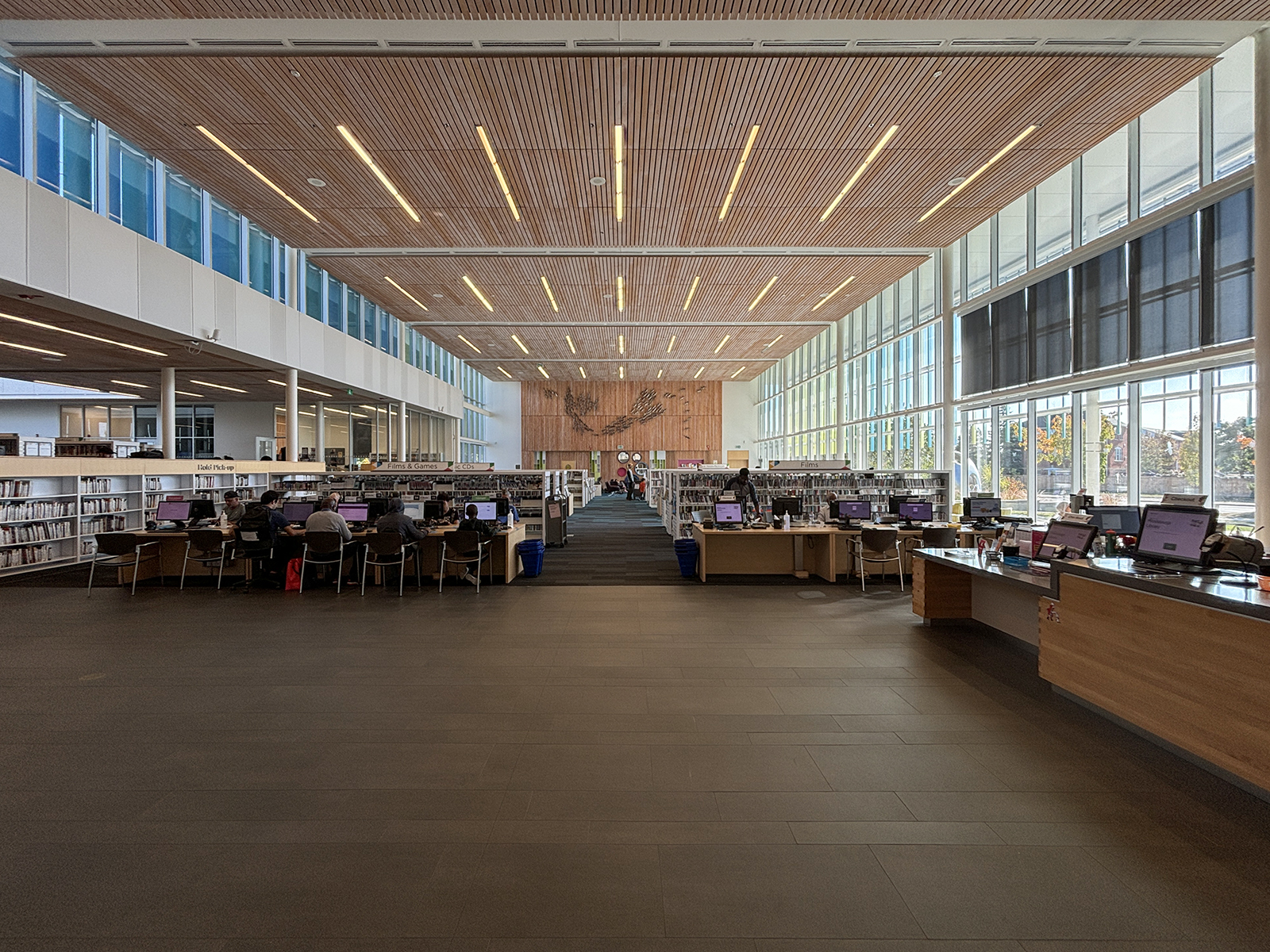
Public Library

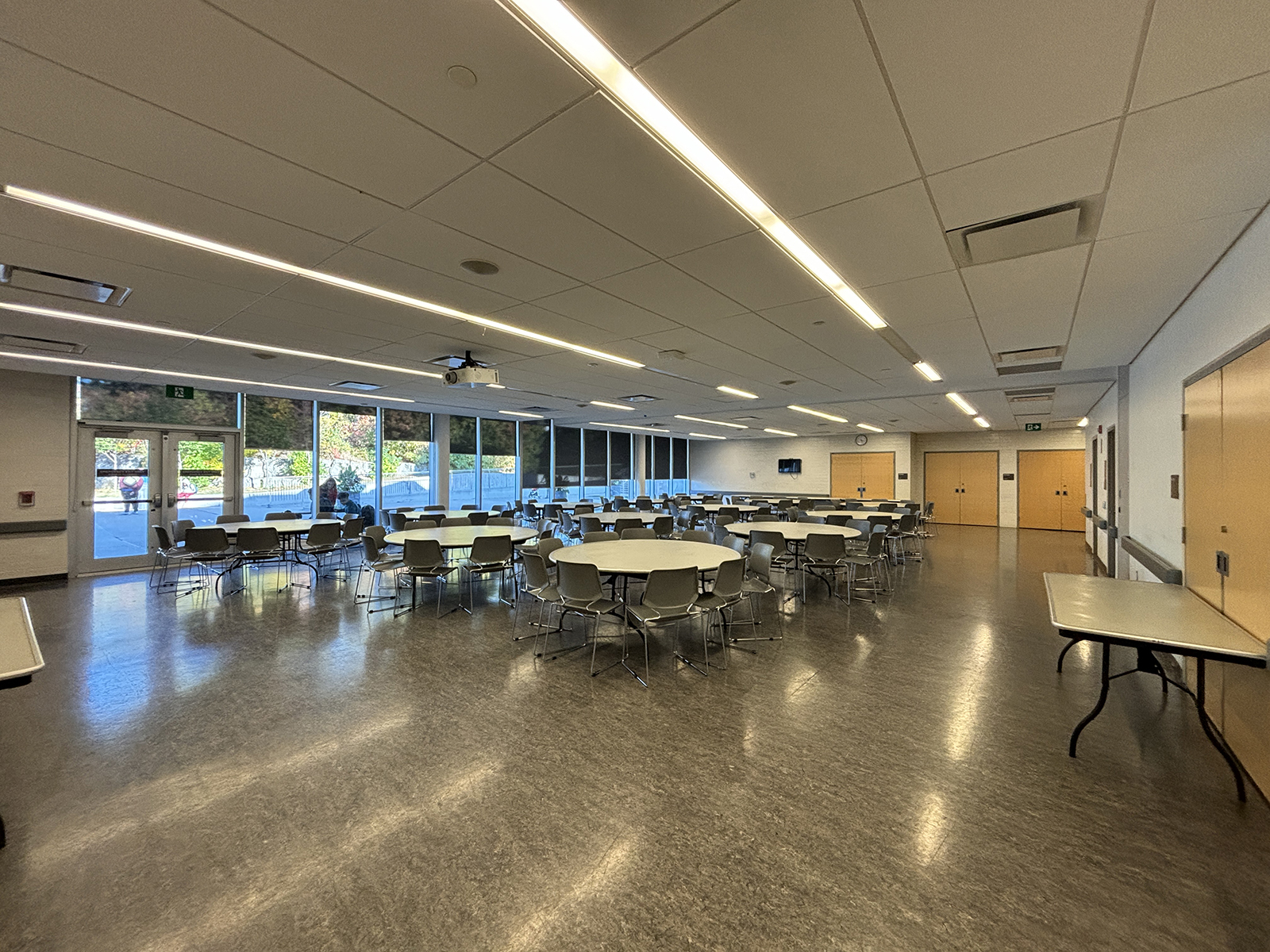
Activity Room

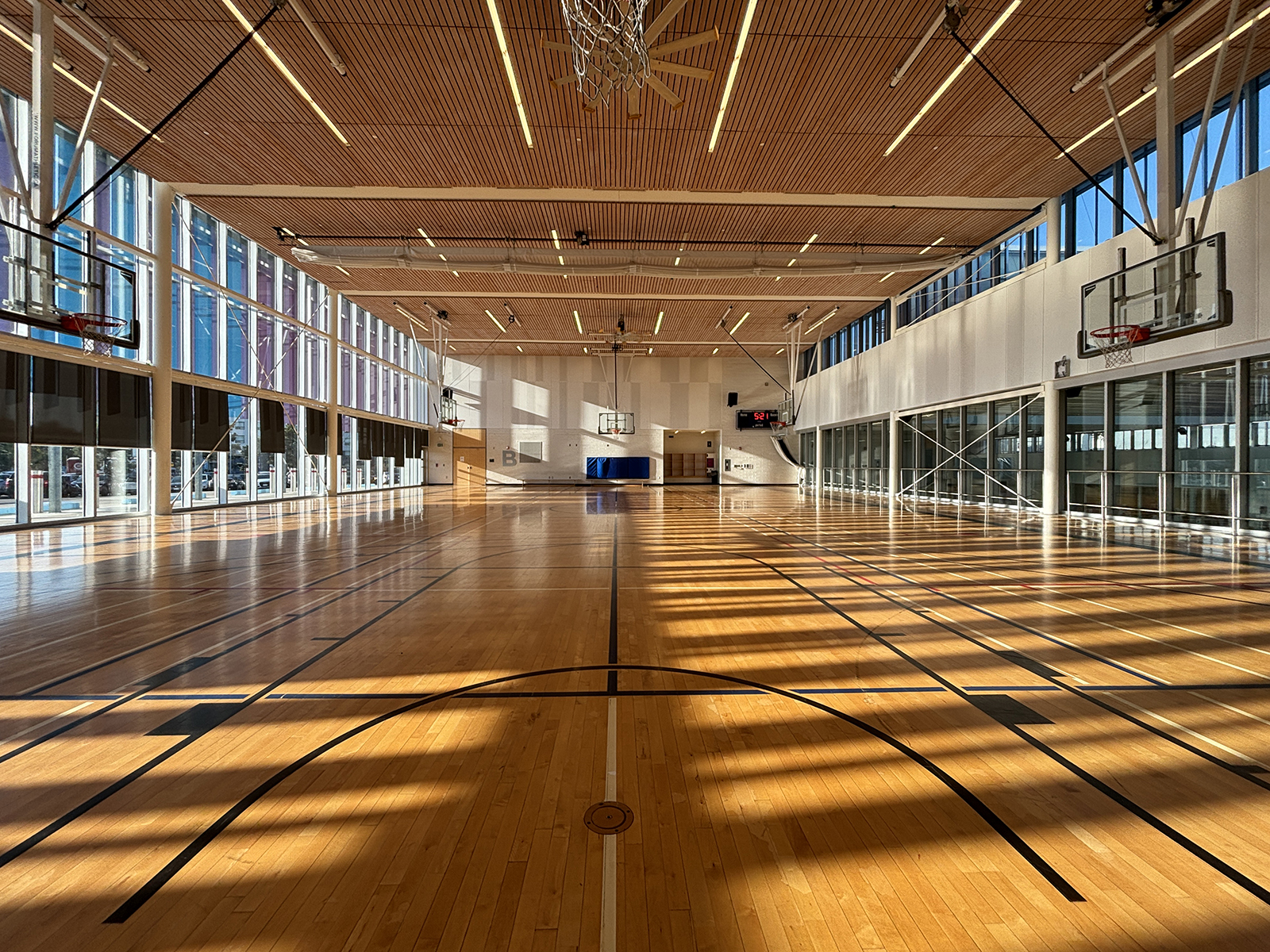
Gymnasium

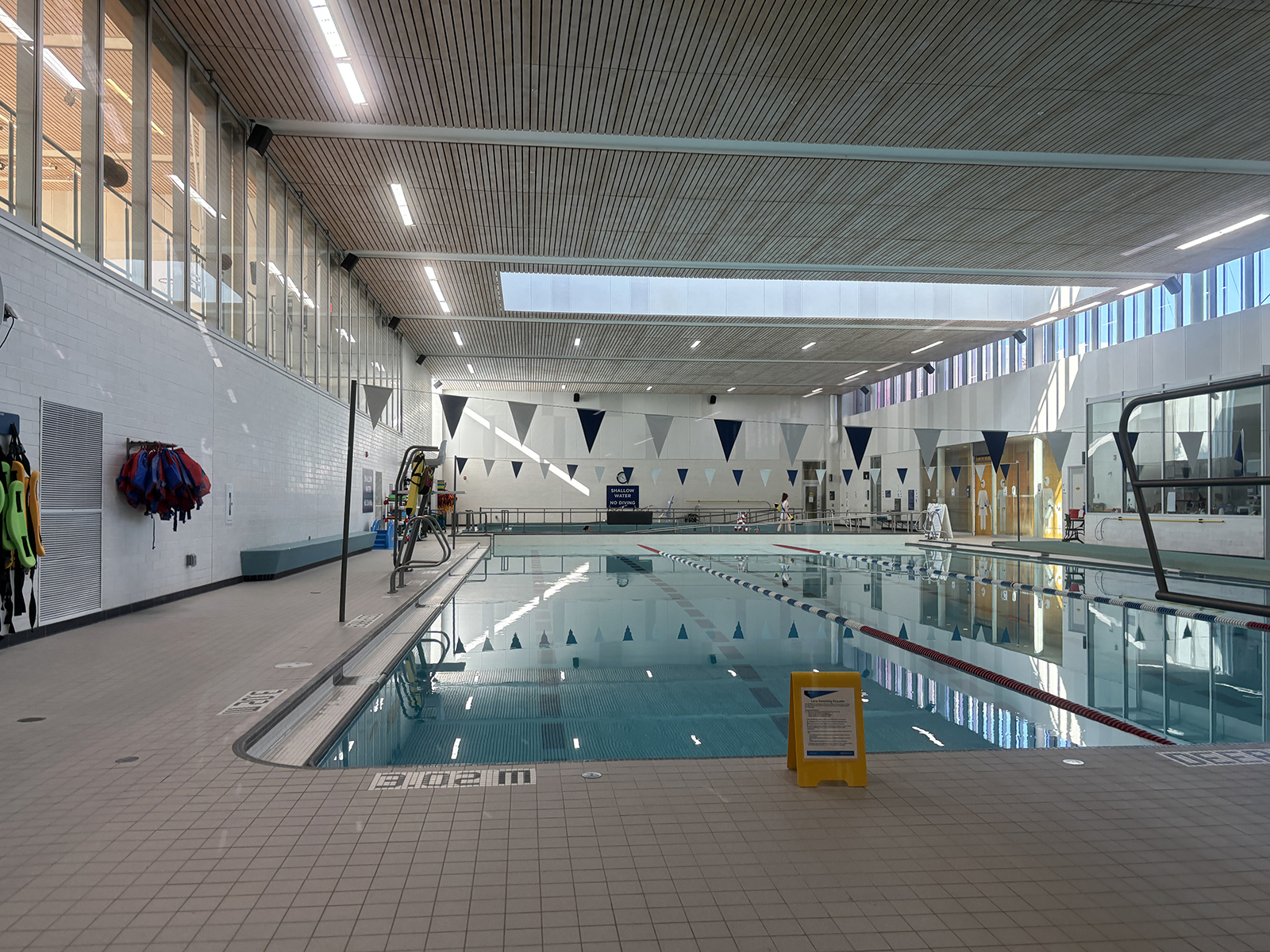
Swimming Pool

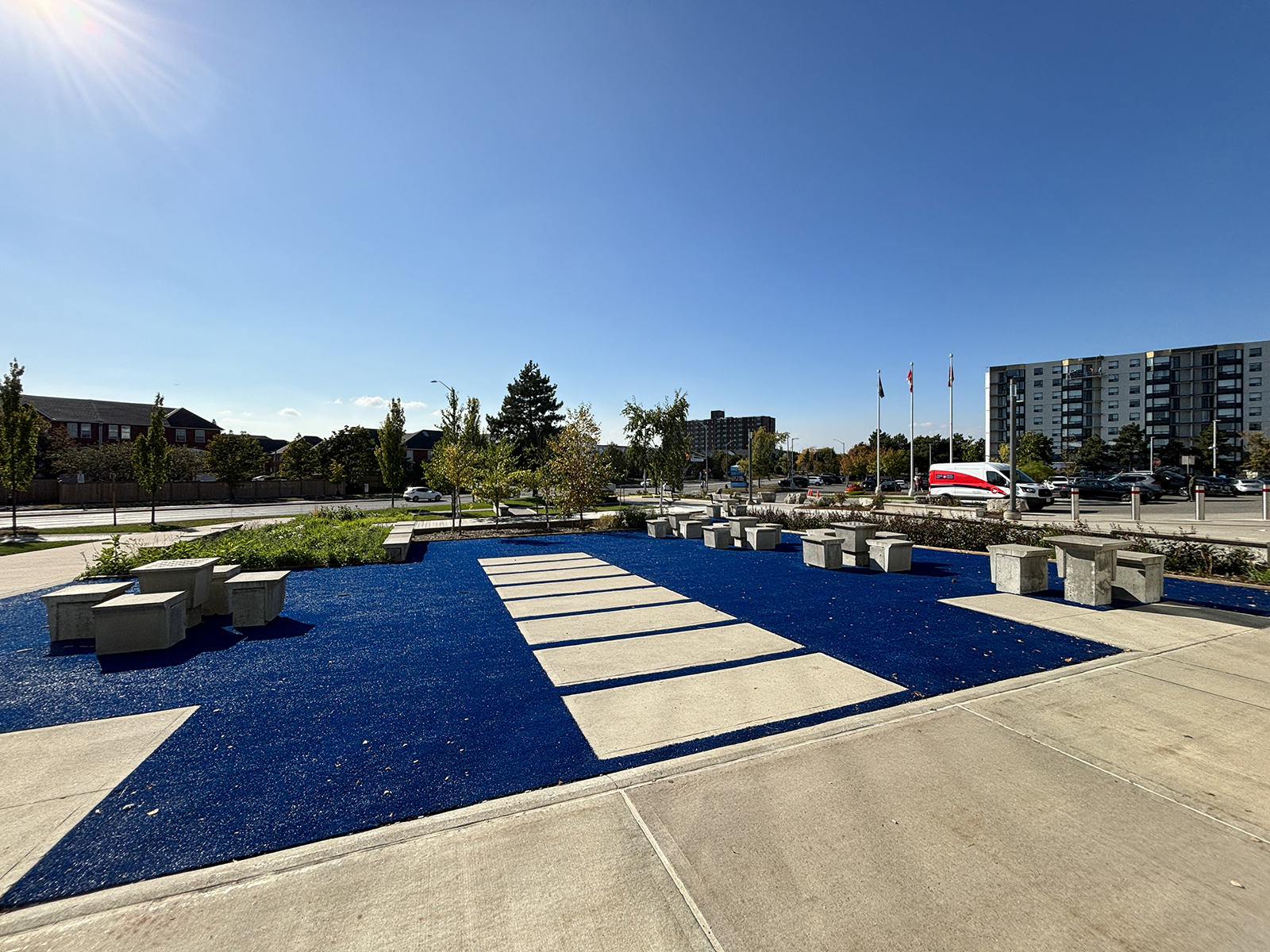
Outdoor open space
