= State Central Library =

State Central Library may refer to:

- Goa State Central Library, India
- State Central Library, Hyderabad, India
- State Central Library, Kerala, India
