= Central Library of Cantabria =

Library in Santander, Cantabria, Spain

Coordinates: 43.4544°N 3.8141°W

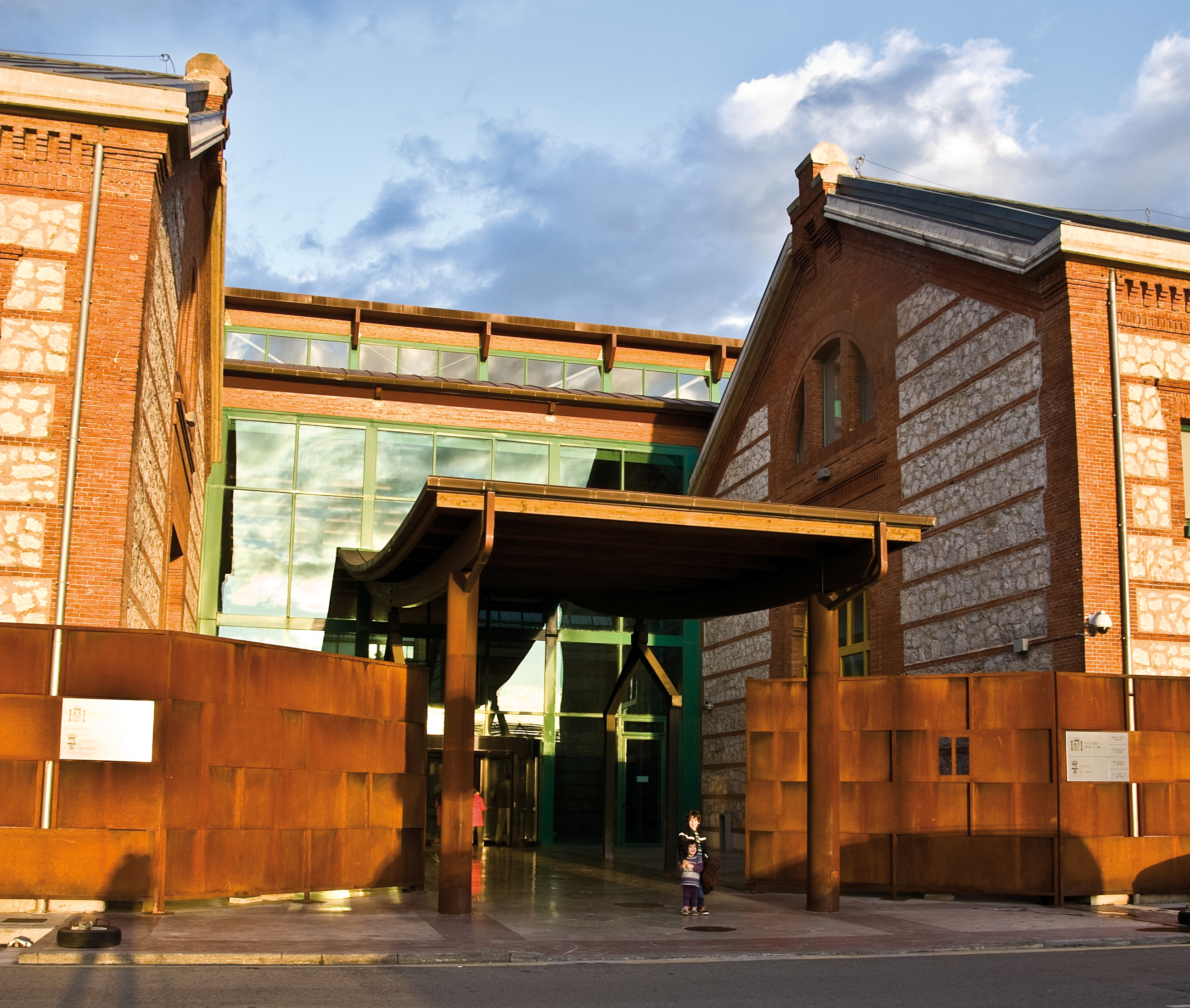

Cantabria Central Library (Spanish: Biblioteca Central de Cantabria) is a library in the city of Santander, in Cantabria, Spain. It was known as the State Public Library of the city of Santander, although on March 23, 1999, it was declared by decree as the Cantabria Central Library of Cantabria.

== History ==
The State Public Library began as a school library when in 1839 it was created for the Instituto Cántabro para la Enseñanza de Náutica y del Comercio. Five years later, during the first change of name of the institute, the Provincial Library was established with funding for the lessons that were taught in the educational institution. It received content from the libraries of the convents of Santa Clara, Santa Catalina de Monte Corbán and San Francisco Santander and some important books from the Las Caldas del Besaya monastery.

Later, the collection increased with subsidies for the purchase of books given to the Provincial Council, and donations from individuals. The Provincial Library was incorporated into Corps Archivists and Librarians in August 1898. When the library passed to the Corps Archivists and Librarians it had less than 5000 volumes; by 1960 it had 25,000.

In 1960 under the agreement signed between the Municipality of Santander and the Ministry of Education, the library was merged with the City Library of Santander, moving their funds and services to the premises of this. Both libraries have served since then working in unison, sharing premises, services, personnel, etc.

Since 23 March 1999, the State Public Library in Santander was declared by decree Cantabria Central Library and the official main library of Cantabria.

In 2009 funds, furniture and workers moving to the building of the former General Deposit in Branch Snuff Tobacco, in an area rehabilitated by the Ministry of Culture, at the Ruiz de Alda street in an area near the port of Santander. On August 3, units of the Central Library in the Gravina road closed its doors.

The new building was inaugurated on December 16 with the presence of the authorities of the region and the Minister of Culture Angeles Gonzalez-Sinde, opening its doors on January 11, 2010.

== Building ==
In 1900, it was built on the sands of Maliaño dock in the port area of Santander, the building now houses the BCC. Built on an area of 12,000 square meters and it was neo-Mudejar. Its proximity to the port facilitated the transport and storage, with half of the snuff imported into Spain was received and stored in the warehouse, distributed by coasting vessels, rail or road to the national eleven factories Tabacalera.

During the civil war, there was a hiatus, turned into a prison for republican prisoners. After this period resumed its original use as a warehouse until 1986.

The rehabilitation of the property is an example of industrial architecture reused to house a cultural institution and the architects in charge of the project were Alejano Eduardo de la Torre, Luciano Moreno Feu and Ricardo Miguel A. Aguilar, being the project coordinator Manuel Martín-Rabadan Caballero.

== Mission and functions ==
BCC's mission is to promote reading, training, research and collect, catalog, store and disseminate bibliographic heritage and print production, sound and visual of Cantabria or make reference to it.

Cantabria Central Library / State Public Library in Santander has a dual function:

1. It Cantabria Central Library, so it is at the head of the Library System of Cantabria.
2. State Public Library is, therefore, exercising the functions designated by the Regulations of the State Public Library System and Library Spanish.

== Collections ==
In 2009 the library has 144,613 bibliographic background documents distributed in the following collections:

- Comicteca
- Legal Deposit
- Old Fund, special and valuable
- Adult General Fund
- Children & Youth Fund
- Local Fund
- Travel Guides
- Newspaper Archive and Media Library
- Reference

== Services ==
- Bibliographic information and reference
- Loan (individual, collective and ILL)
- Reading room of the collections
- Internet access and electronic information
- Bureau of Legal Deposit and Intellectual Property
- User training
- Facilities: research offices, group rooms and assembly hall
- Cultural activities
- Reproduction of documents
