= Mississauga Library System =

- Location: Mississauga, Ontario, Canada
- Type: Public library
- Established: 1956
- Branches: 18

Collection
- Items collected: business directories, maps, books, periodicals, genealogy, local history,
- Size: 1.3 million

Access and use
- Circulation: 7,301,788 (2012)
- Population served: 770,000

Other information
- Budget: $26,453,145
- Director: Rona O'Banion
- Website: mississauga.ca/library

The Mississauga Library System, or Mississauga Library, is the public library system for the city of Mississauga, Ontario. The system has 18 branches, consisting of the Hazel McCallion Central Library and 17 smaller neighbourhood libraries. It eliminated late fees in 2022.

== Hazel McCallion Central Library ==
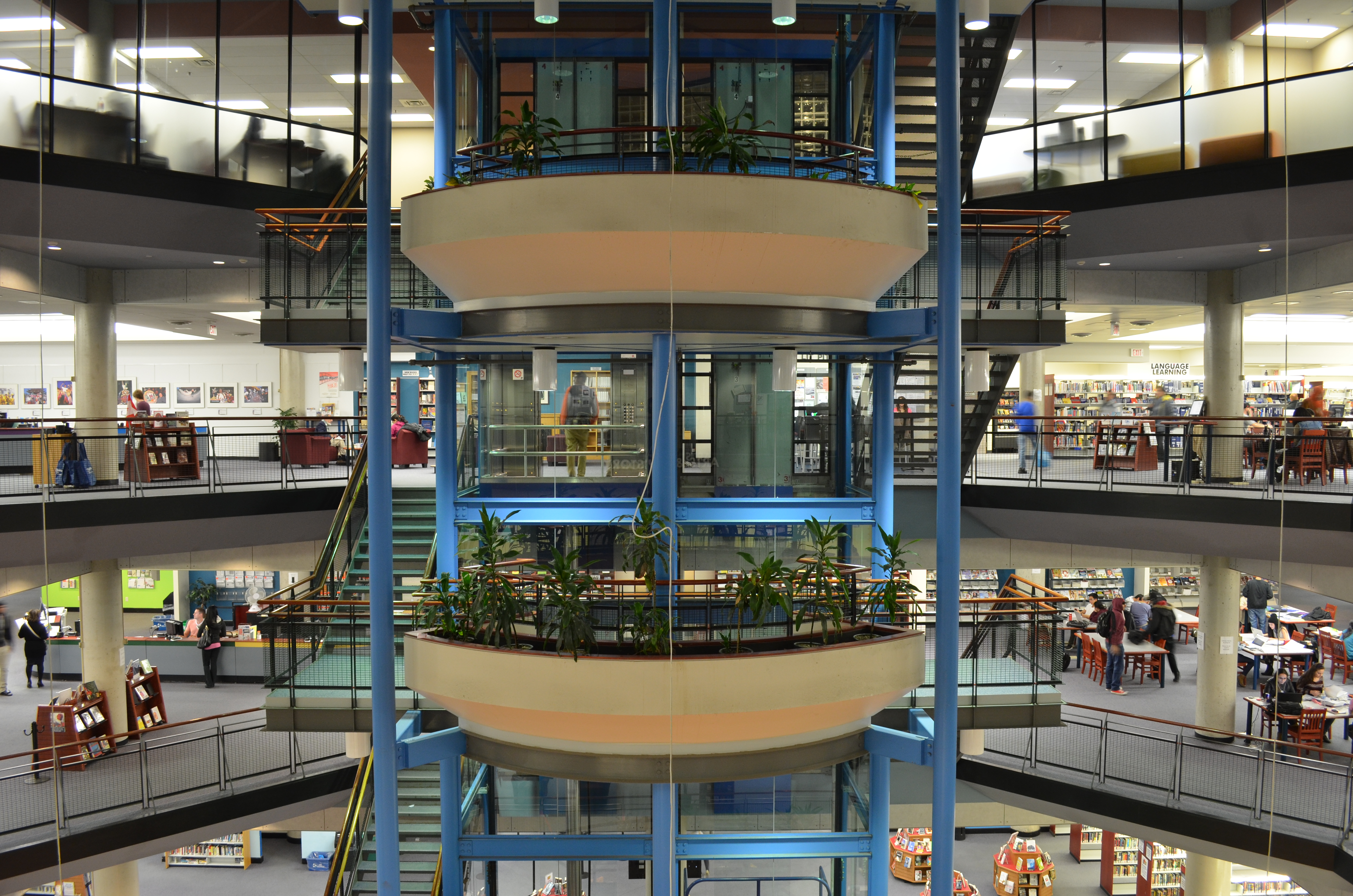
Interior of the Central Library prior to the 2023 renovation.

The Hazel McCallion Central Library (commonly shortened to Central Library) is located in the city centre at 301 Burnhamthorpe Road West, adjacent to the Mississauga Civic Centre. It is the largest branch of the Mississauga Library System, containing four floors of materials and a further floor for silent study, and has functioned as the main library for the system since its opening in 1991 as the Mississauga Central Library.

The Central Library closed for extensive renovations during the COVID-19 pandemic. The library was renamed in February 2021 to honour the centennial birthday of Mississauga's longest-serving mayor, Hazel McCallion. The Hazel McCallion Central Library was reopened to the public on December 19, 2023 with limited hours before its official grand reopening on February 3, 2024.

== Branches ==
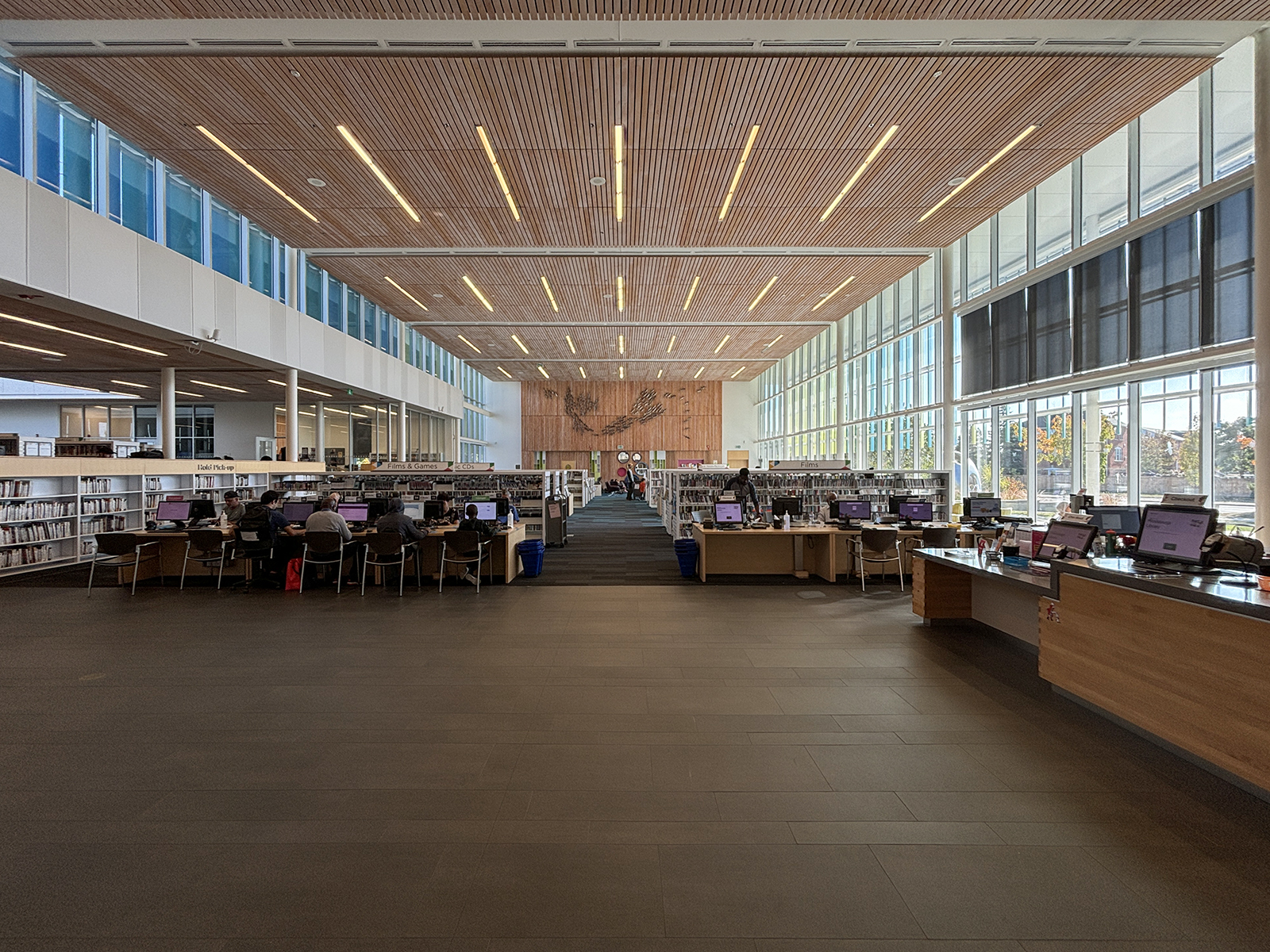
The Meadowvale Community Centre was renovated in July 2014 and re-opened in fall 2016 with a new library within the building.

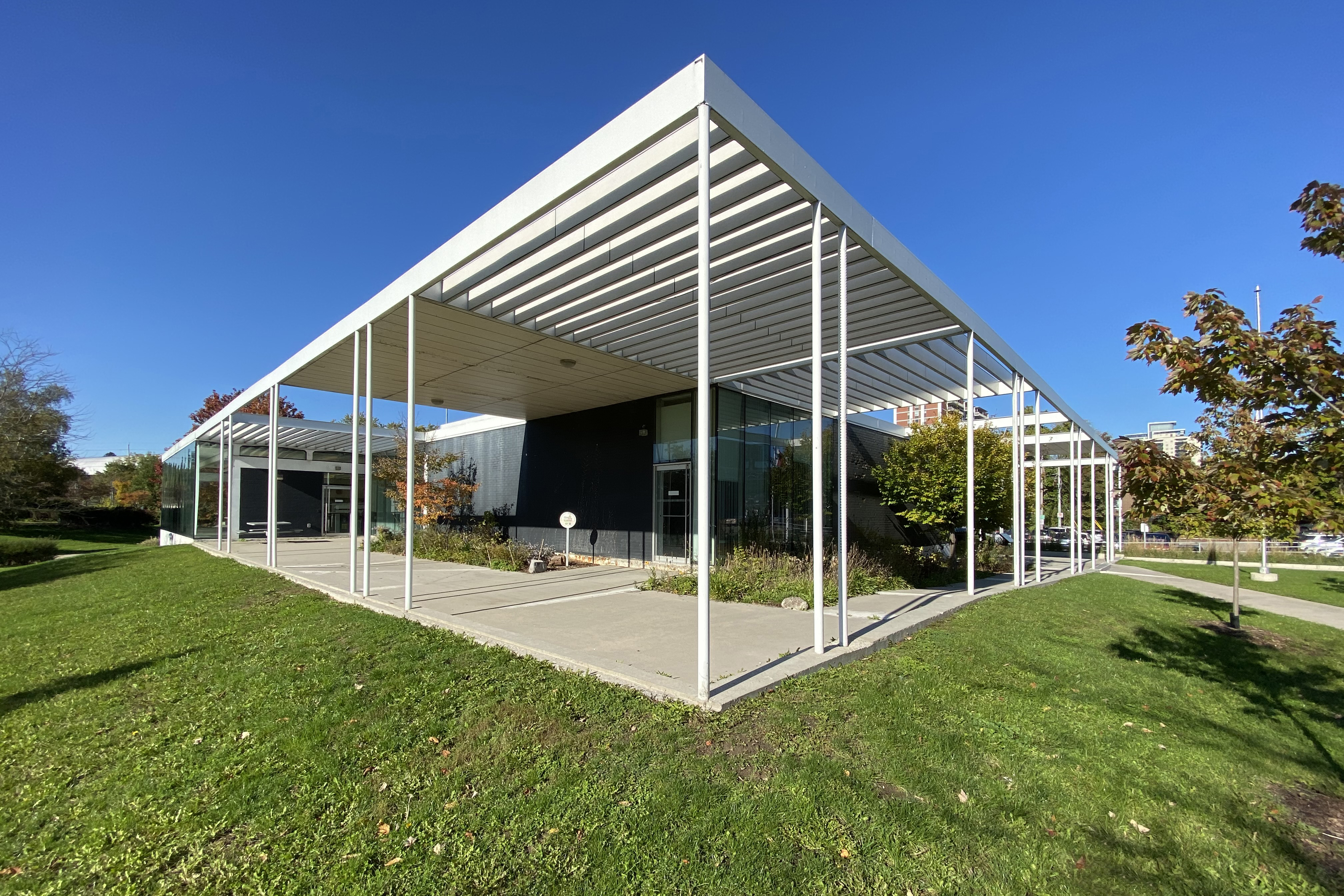
The Port Credit Library $3.1 million renovation project completed in 2013, however due to the building structure issues, it closed since June 28, 2021. It has since been reopened as of August 2023.

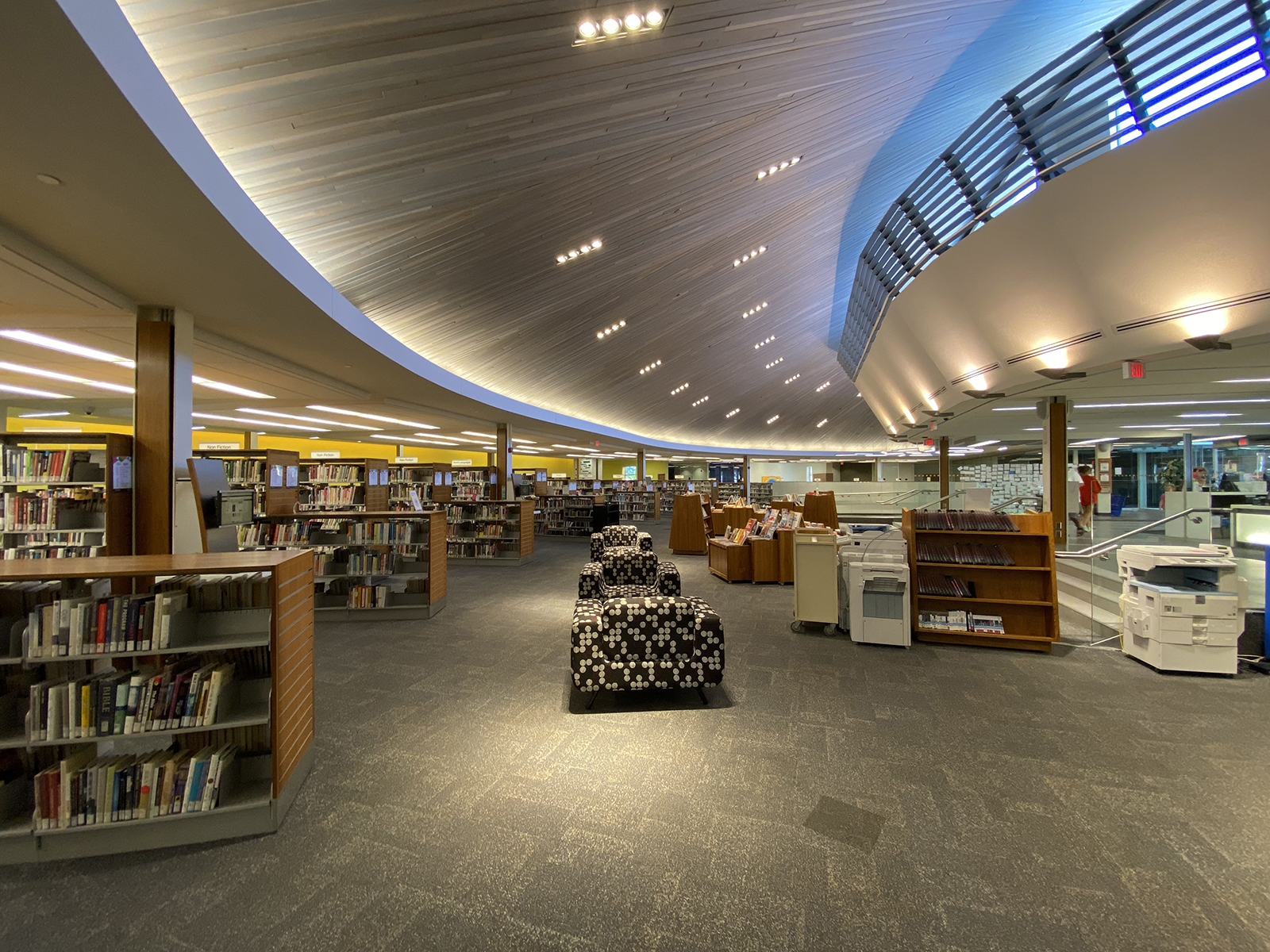
Burnhamthorpe Library

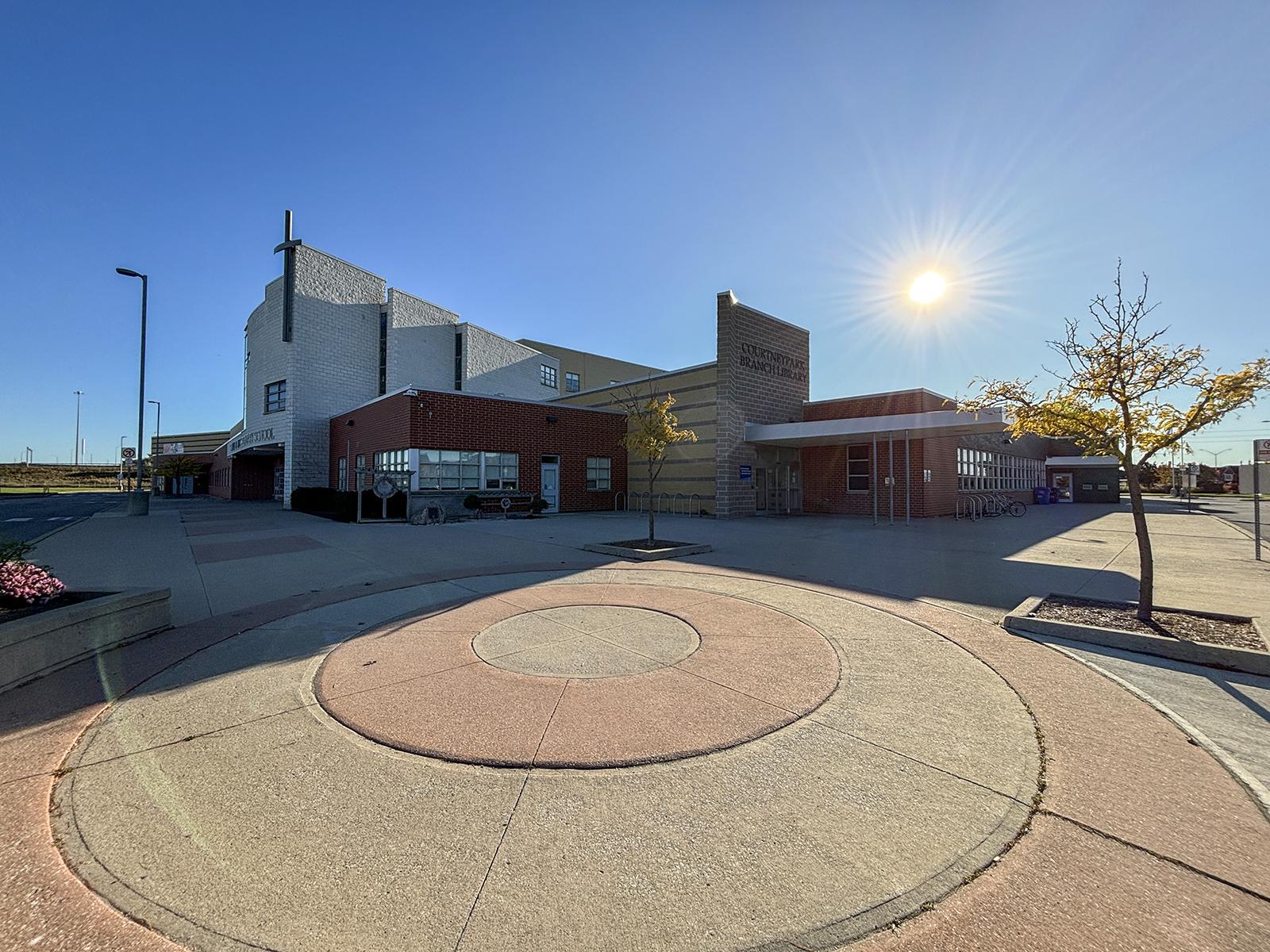
Courtneypark Library shares the building with St. Marcellinus Secondary School. It is also the second largest library branch in the city of Mississauga.

| Branch | Address | Date opened | Notes |
|---|---|---|---|
| Burnhamthorpe | 43.62113°N 79.60306°W | 1976 | Shares facilities with Dixie Bloor Neighbourhood Center and Maja Prentice Theater |
| Churchill Meadows | 43.55275°N 79.74730°W | January 2007 | Shares facilities with St. Joan of Arc Catholic Secondary School |
| Clarkson | 43.51153°N 79.65038°W | 1956 | At current location since 2002. |
| Cooksville | 43.58051°N 79.61728°W | June 2004 | |
| Courtneypark | 43.62410°N 79.71001°W | November 2004 | Shares facilities with St. Marcellinus Secondary School |
| Erin Meadows | 43.55629°N 79.71677°W | September 15, 2001 | Shares facilities with St. Aloysius Gonzaga Secondary School |
| Frank McKechnie | 43.61663°N 79.65324°W | June 24, 2000 | |
| Lakeview | 43.58329°N 79.56312°W | 1967 | |
| Lorne Park | 43.53100°N 79.62768°W | 1967 | |
| Malton | 43.72322°N 79.63885°W | 1977 | |
| Meadowvale | 43.58502°N 79.75613°W | 1974 | At current location since 2016. Shares facilities with Meadowvale Community Centre. It is located on the upper level. |
| Mississauga Valley | 43.59701°N 79.62421°W | January 26, 1980 | Shares facilities with Mississauga Valley Community Center |
| Port Credit | 43.55168°N 79.58647°W | 1962 | $3.1 million renovation project completed in 2013, however due to the building structure issue, it closed since June 28, 2021. It has since been reopened as of August 2023. |
| Sheridan | 43.53047°N 79.65252°W | 1976 | At current location in Sheridan Mall since 2002. |
| South Common | 43.54216°N 79.68454°W | 1983 | At current location since 1998. When it was located at 2227 South Millway Drive, the branch was known as Erin Mills South branch. Closed as of June 17, 2024 for a three-year renovation. |
| Streetsville | 43.58376°N 79.71704°W | 1967 | |
| Woodlands | 43.56277°N 79.64943°W | April 7, 1975 | At current location since 2014. |

== See also ==
- Ontario Public Libraries
- Ask Ontario
