= St. Marcellinus Secondary School =

Catholic high school located in Mississauga, Ontario

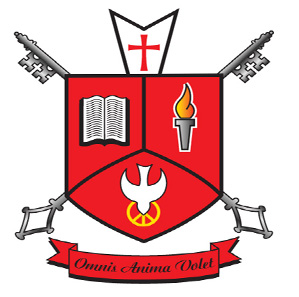

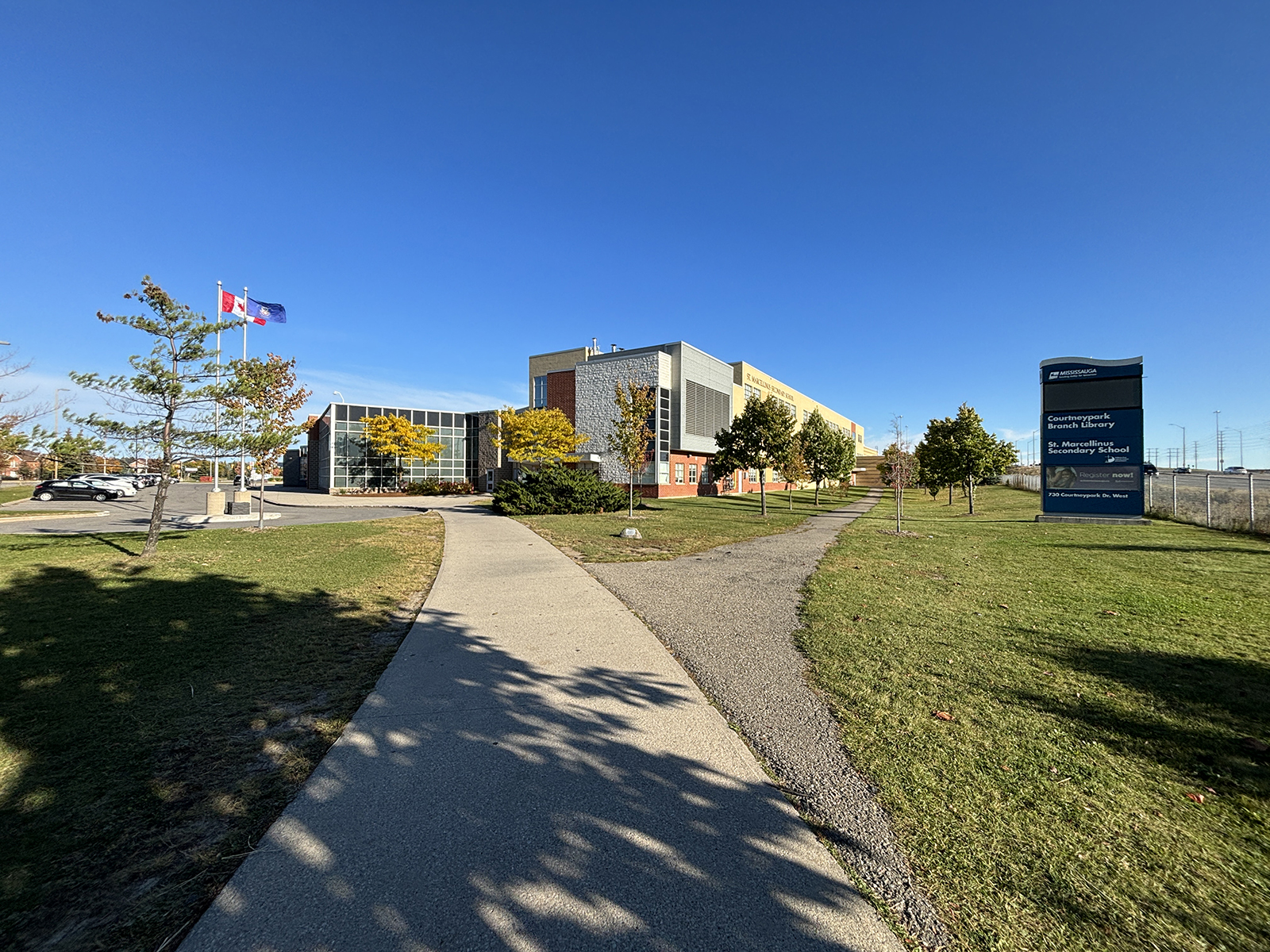

Location
- 730 Courtneypark Drive West. Mississauga, Ontario, L5W 1L9; Canada; 43.62367°N 79.7102°W

Information
- School type: Provincial, Catholic Secondary School
- Motto: Let Every Spirit Soar
- Religious affiliation: Roman Catholic
- Founded: 2003
- School board: Dufferin-Peel Catholic District School Board
- Superintendent: Laura Odo
- Area trustee: Thomas Thomas; Luz del Rosario
- School number: 821381
- Principal: Maria Bueno
- Grades: 9 to 12
- Enrolment: 1838 (As of October 31, 2015)
- Language: English, programs include French
- Campus: Suburban
- Area: Mississauga Central
- Colours: red, black
- Team name: St. Marcellinus Spirit
- Website: www.dpcdsb.org/MARCL

St. Marcellinus Secondary School (commonly referred to as Marcies) is a Catholic high school located in Mississauga, Ontario.

== History ==
The construction of St. Marcellinus was necessary to decrease overpopulation at St. Joseph Secondary School and St. Francis Xavier Secondary School by providing teens living in the newly developed Meadowvale Village area an easily accessible secondary school. John McAllister was hired as the founding principal of the school, along with only 12 original teachers and 3 secretaries. The school opened with 143 grade 9 students in a temporary location in Streetsville during its formation. The school shared this facility with John Cabot Catholic Secondary School and St. Edmund Campion Secondary School. In September 2004, the school moved to its new permanent facility at Mavis Road and Courtneypark Drive West. The state of the art institution is part of a shared facility agreement with the City of Mississauga. The campus includes the second largest library in the City of Mississauga and a track and field complex that boasts a $1,000,000 artificial field and an 8 lane all weather track.

== Feeder Schools ==
- St. Barbara Catholic Elementary School
- St. Gregory Catholic Elementary School
- St. Julia Catholic Elementary School
- St. Veronica Catholic Elementary School

== Courtneypark Library ==
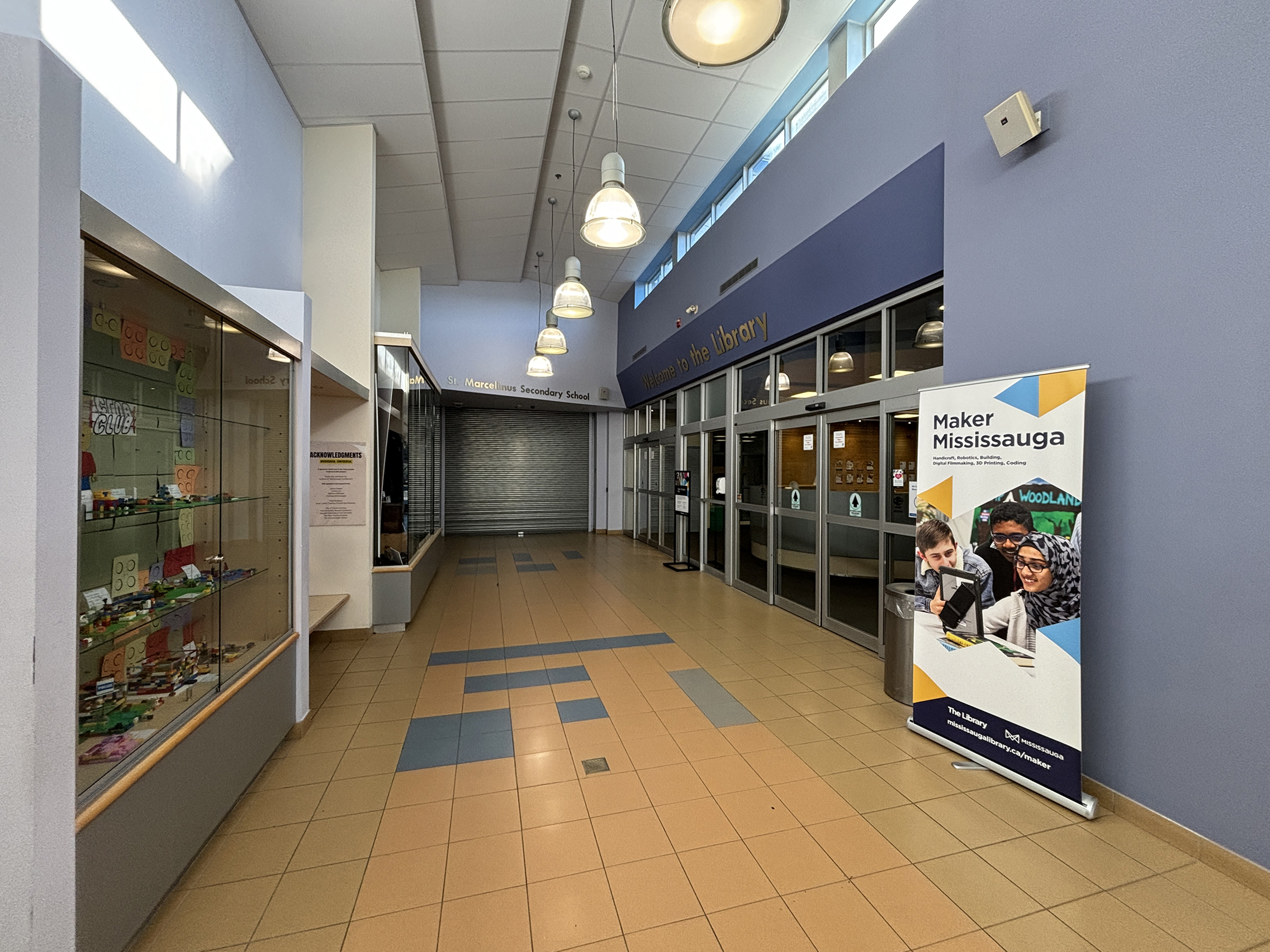
Courtneypark Library shares the building with St. Marcellinus Secondary School.

The Courtneypark Library serves as both a community library with resources and programs geared to the everyday requirements of all ages of users, and a school library for the school. This library is a shared facility between the City of Mississauga and the Dufferin-Peel Catholic District School Board.

== Lab Explosion ==
In March 2010, a routine chemistry experiment at St. Marcellinus exploded into flames when a Bunsen burner ignited a beaker full of methanol. The incident sent five students to the hospital and left one student critically injured. Lab safety experts determined that the incident could have been prevented with better safety equipment.

== Stabbing ==
On April 26, 2022, an altercation occurred on the soccer field shortly after 12pm. The police were called just before 12:30pm and discovered that 2 students had been stabbed during the altercation, and that the suspect had fled the scene. During this time, St. Marcellinus was placed under lockdown and Mississauga Secondary was placed in a hold and secure until the police confirmed that there was no longer a threat. The two students were transported to a local hospital and treated for non life threatening stab wounds. The suspect, a 15 year old who was not a St. Marcellinus student, was located and taken into custody. He is scheduled to appear in court at a later date.

== Notable alumni ==
- Jonelle Filigno (2008), NWSL soccer player, Olympic bronze medalist for Canada
- Dominic Panganiban (2008), YouTube animator
- Brandon Bridge (2010), CFL football player
- RJ Barrett (2018 - transferred), NBA basketball player
- Leah Pais (2019), NSL soccer player
- Caleb Houstan (2021 - transferred), NBA basketball player

== See also ==
- Education in Ontario
- List of secondary schools in Ontario
