= International Journal of Computational Methods =

- Language: English

Publication details
- Publisher: World Scientific (Singapore)

Standard abbreviations
- ISO 4: Int. J. Comput. Methods

Indexing
- ISSN: 0219-8762 (print); 1793-6969 (web)

Links
- Journal homepage

The International Journal of Computational Methods has been published by World Scientific since 2004. It covers modern computational methods, such as optimizations, interpolations and approximation techniques and real-time computation. It aims for interdisciplinary coverage of real-life applications, whether in theoretical, simulated forms or actual programming.

The current Chief Editors are G.R. Liu, R.C. Batra, G. Yagawa, E. Oñate, and Z.H. Zhong.

== Abstracting and indexing ==
The journal is abstracted and indexed in Science Citation Index Expanded, Journal Citation Reports/Science Edition, Zentralblatt MATH, Compendex, and Inspec.
