= Central Library, IIT Bombay =

Coordinates: 19.134°N 72.915075°E

IIT Bombay Central Library
- Location: Mumbai, India
- Type: Special library
- Established: 1958

Other information
- Director: Dr. Manju Naika (Chief Library Officer)
- Parent organization: Indian Institute of Technology Bombay
- Website: www.library.iitb.ac.in

The Library is one of the central support services of IIT Bombay. The mission of the Library is to provide information services and access to bibliographic and full text digital and printed resources in order to support the scholarly and information needs of the students, faculty and staff at the Institute Community.

== Overview ==
The library occupies an independent five-storey building and has several reading halls, an exhibit area and user spaces. The library offers circulation of books, and also a bookbank of textbooks for loan to students whose parents' income falls below the taxable limit.

The Central Library provides web-based access to over 450 books, 12,000 full text journals, 10 databases, 450 print periodicals, 1000 CDs and 231 DVDs, as well as a number of theses and dissertations, standards and reports and pamphlets. The Library supports electronic submission of theses and dissertations by postgraduate and doctoral students. During 2017-2018 year 749 Master's degree dissertations, 367 PhD theses and 239 dual-degree theses were submitted and approved by supervisor via this system. The library also maintains Inter-Library Loan relations with a number of institutions and libraries including IITs, BARC, NITIE, NCST, IISc, IIG, TIFR, IGIDR, TISS and NICT.

Dr. Manju Naika is the current Chief library Officer.
