= Meadowvale Village, Mississauga =

Neighbourhood in Mississauga, Ontario

Meadowvale Village
- Preserved hamlet Neighbourhood
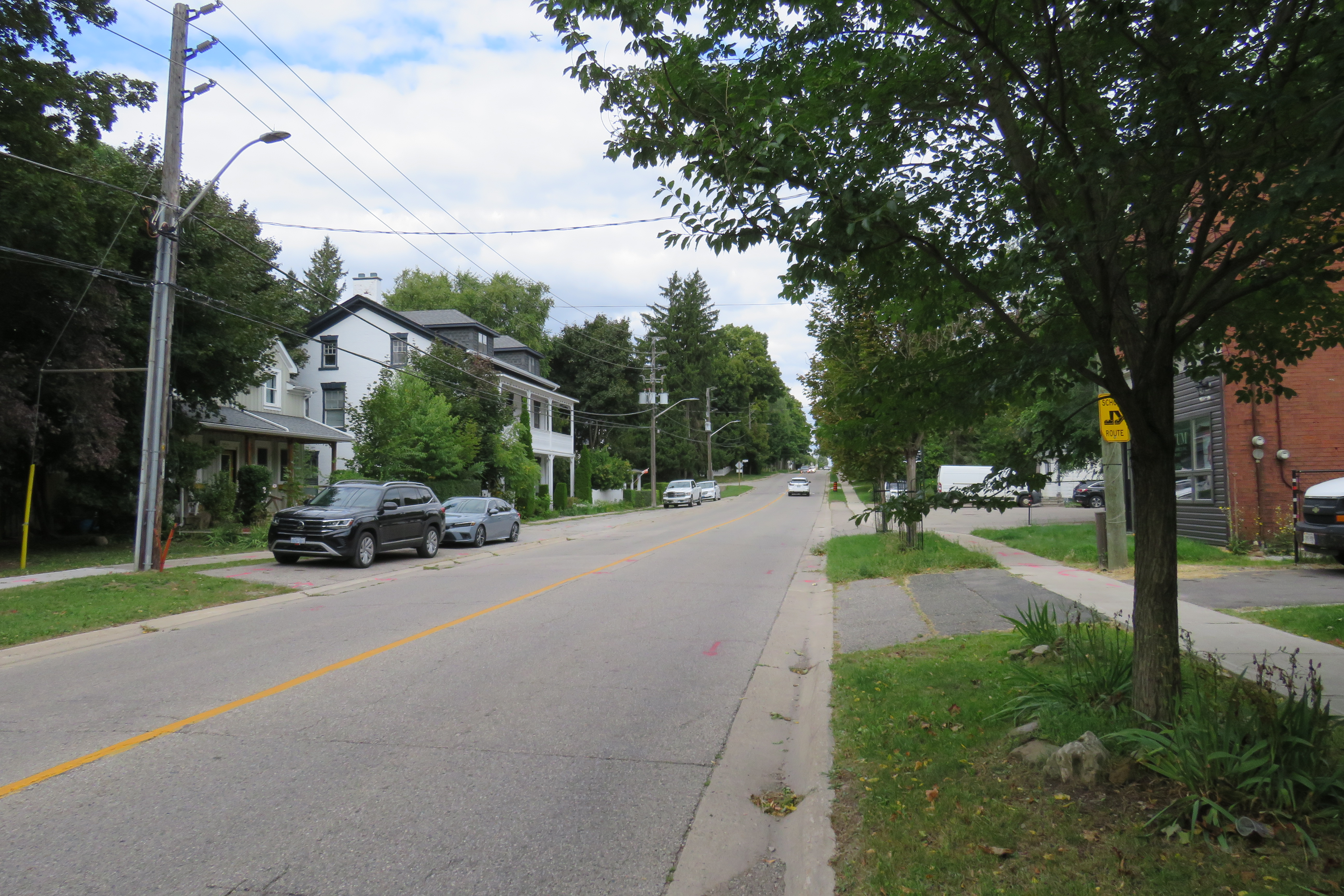
- The historic area of Meadowvale Village along Old Derry Road
- Interactive map of Meadowvale Village
- Coordinates: 43°37′37″N 79°43′40″W
- Country: Canada
- Province: Ontario
- Regional municipality: Peel
- City: Mississauga
- Founded: 1836 (as hamlet)
- Changed Division: 1974 Peel Region from Peel County
- Changed Municipality: 1968 Mississauga from Toronto Township (as Town) 1974 (as City)
- Postal codes: L5N and L5W

Meadowvale Village (originally just Meadowvale) is a preserved hamlet and neighbourhood in the city of Mississauga, Ontario, Canada, within the larger suburban Meadowvale district, which gets its name from the historic community, which is located at Old Derry Road and Second Line West. The larger neighbourhood's approximate boundaries are the Levi and Fletcher's Creeks to the west and east respectively, Highway 401 to the south, and Mississauga's city limits to the north.

As the village is partially situated in the floodplain of the Credit River (which is unusually wide in the vicinity), where development is prohibited, there is a sizeable swathe of preserved rural land immediately to the west, extending to south of Highway 401.

Notable landmarks include:

- Gooderham Estate - a Georgian manor house built by Charles Horace Gooderham and later became Rose Villa under John Watt
- Meadowvale Conservation Area - on lands once home to Silverthorne Grist Mill

== History ==
The Meadowvale hamlet was founded in 1836 and is Ontario's first heritage conservation district. Charles Horace Gooderham (1844-1904), son of the founder of Gooderham and Worts William Gooderham Sr., built his "country property" Georgian manor on Main Street (now 929 Old Derry Road) in northern Toronto Township in 1870 as he was sent there to manage Silverthorne Grist Mill acquired by his family firm. Gooderham's mansion was sold in 1884 when the family Gooderham and Worts left the area and was later sold to in 1895 John Watt. After successive owners, the home was re-purposed for other uses and after abandonment it became home to the present day Rotherglen School's Meadowvale Campus in 1996. The population growth increased after Gooderham built his property. In 1968, Meadowvale Village, within Toronto Township, became part of the Town of Mississauga when the township was restructured, with Mississauga becoming a city in 1974.

In the early 1990s, Peel Region began construction of a new alignment of Derry Road to bypass the village, after years of opposition by residents with the original plan to widen the road through it, which would have required demolishing most of the historic buildings. The new Derry Road alignment opened on November 5, 1994, with the original road through the village later being renamed Old Derry Road. Second Line West was later also bypassed by a northern extension of Mavis Road, and cut off to the north and south.

== Modern Meadowvale Village ==
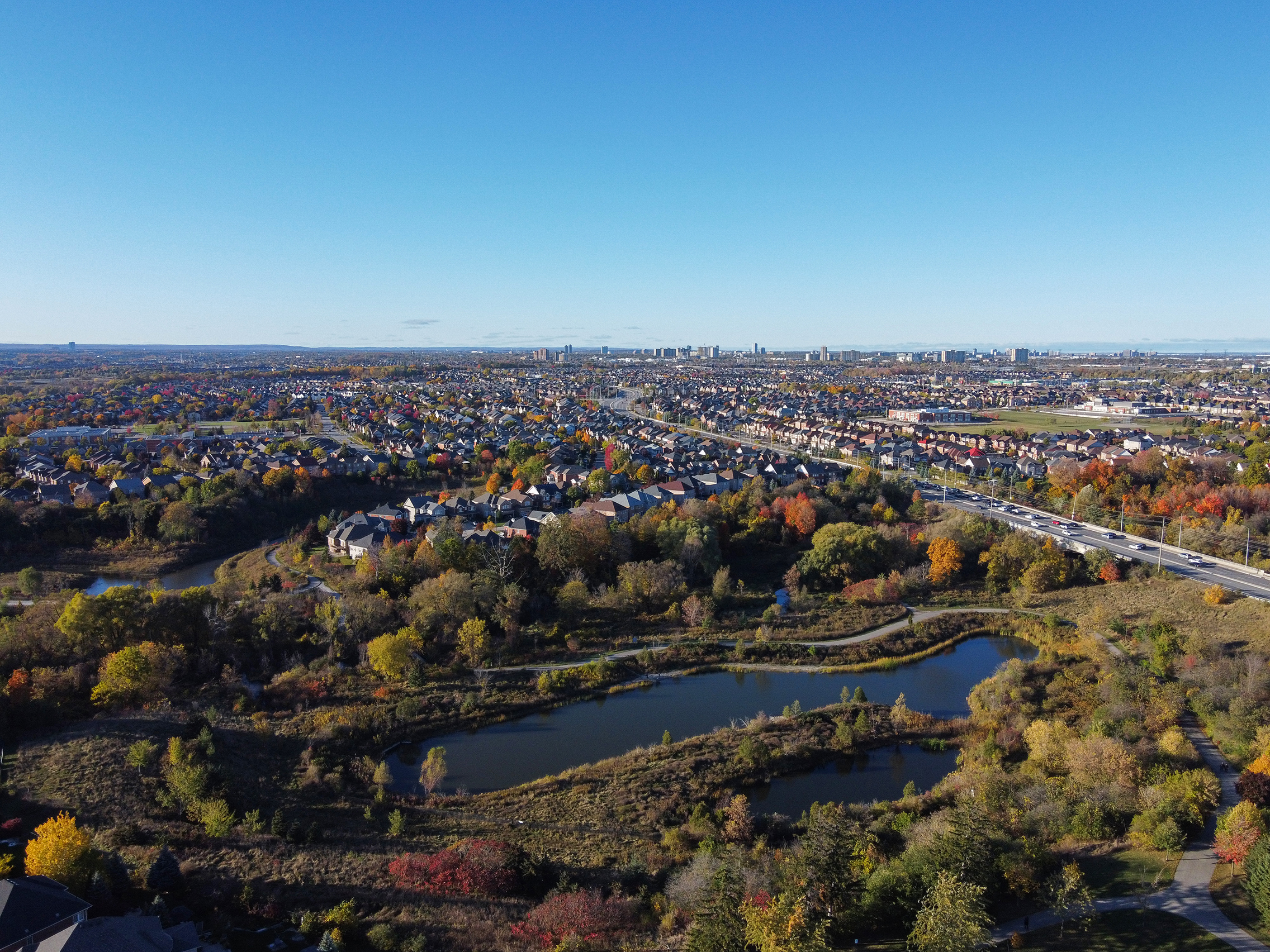
Aerial view of Meadowvale Village as a whole

Today the area is well-populated, culturally diverse, and contains mostly single-family dwellings. Meadowvale Village has four schools: three with the Peel public board or Peel Catholic board, and one Montessori. There is some commercial activity; mainly along Old Derry Road in the old village area. The Credit River passes through the village area, with the Meadowvale Conservation Area located just to the north. Local roads include Old Derry Road and Second Line West (the hamlet's original crossroads), John Watt and Gooderham Estates Boulevards, and Silverthorn Mill Avenue; with Derry, Mavis, and McLaughlin Roads being major arteries through the newer areas. There are extant ruins of the abutments for a bridge of the Toronto-Guelph Suburban Line, where it once crossed a canal for a mill.

== In popular culture ==
The 2000 film Ginger Snaps had a scene filmed in Silver Fox Forest, a woodlot and local park on Danthorpe Drive.
