= St. Roch Catholic Secondary School =

Catholic high school in Credit Valley, Canada

Location
- 200 Valleyway Drive; Credit Valley, Brampton, Ontario, L6X 0N3; Canada; 43.67296°N 79.80677°W

Information
- School type: Separate High School
- Motto: Lux mentis... Lux orbis (Light of the Mind... Light of the World)
- Religious affiliation: Roman Catholic
- Founded: 2009
- School board: Dufferin-Peel Catholic District School Board
- Superintendent: Viviana Varano
- Area trustee: Darryl D'Souza
- Principal: Casey Homick (2009-2013) Manny Farrugia (2013-2016) Jeff Quenneville (2017-2024) Natalie Currah (2024 - present)
- Grades: 9 (2009) 9 to 12(2012-present)
- Language: English, programs include French
- Campus: Suburban
- Area: Credit Valley
- Colours: Purple, Yellow, and Black
- Team name: Ravens
- Website: www.dpcdsb.org/ROCHS/

St. Roch Catholic Secondary School is a high school in Credit Valley, Brampton, Ontario, Canada. The school's principal is Natalie Currah.

St Roch Catholic Secondary School opened on September 8, 2009. The school is located in the Credit Valley neighbourhood of Brampton.

== Elementary Feeder Schools ==
- Guardian Angels Catholic Elementary School
- St. Jacinta Marto Catholic Elementary School (North of Queen Street)
- St. Jean-Marie Vianney Catholic Elementary School
- St. Ursula Catholic Elementary School

== Regional Centre for the Arts ==
St. Roch is a Regional Centre for the Arts with curriculum in dance, drama, instrumental music, media arts and vocal music. Students wishing to pursue the arts must successfully complete a rigorous application and audition process involving teacher referrals, character recommendations and auditions in front of faculty.

As of September 2020, the board's planning department had put a cap on 375 grade 9 students, since it cannot accommodate portables on site. It redirects incoming Grade 9 students to nearby St. Augustine.

== RochTV ==
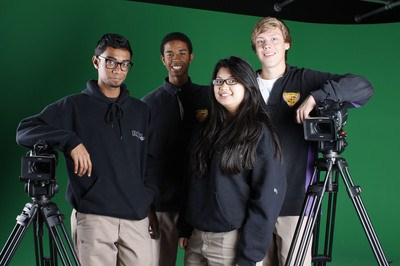
Roch TV

RochTV is an in-school TV station run by the students of St. Roch Catholic Secondary School enrolled in the media program. The school's broadcast infrastructure operates at 1080i HD broadcast signal to LCD TVs, Smartboards, or HD data projectors that are installed in classrooms throughout the school.

The show broadcasts a monthly production schedule in which segments highlight monthly stories, important events and team sports updates, all being put together by the students. Historically, Roch TV has been presented in a pre-recorded format, however, in 2013, a shift to live TV has taken place.

Each year, Roch TV organizes a boot camp to provide all Media Majors with the opportunity to re-certify on all cameras as well as learn about any new equipment that requires training and certification. Roch TV also helps to train students on core equipment and also how to create basic segments for a newscast. Senior students are trained each year on audio equipment and the studio control room technology.

== Community location ==
The school is located in the Estates of Credit Ridge Springbrook Community. The school's specific location is Credit Valley, Brampton, Ontario, 200 Valleyway Dr. Its catchment area is bounded by Mississauga Road to the West, Fairhill Avenue to the North, McLaughlin Road to the East and Queen Street to the South.

== Chaplaincy ==
St. Roch is a Catholic School that includes a chapel, and the chaplain is Eric Luscombe. The school represents itself through St. Roch. The designated parish of the school is St. Jerome's Parish.

== Athletics ==
The mascot of the athletics teams is the Raven. St. Roch is home to a variety of team-associated sports, including;

- Football
- Wrestling
- Volleyball
- Basketball
- Hockey
- Baseball
- Softball
- Swimming
- Rugby
- Soccer
- Skiing
- Flag football
- Badminton
- Tennis
- Curling
- Track and field

== Notable alumni ==
- Joshua Palmer, NFL Wide Receiver for the Buffalo Bills
- Kyra Constantine, Canadian Olympic sprinter
- Shane Harte, actor and singer.

== School uniform ==
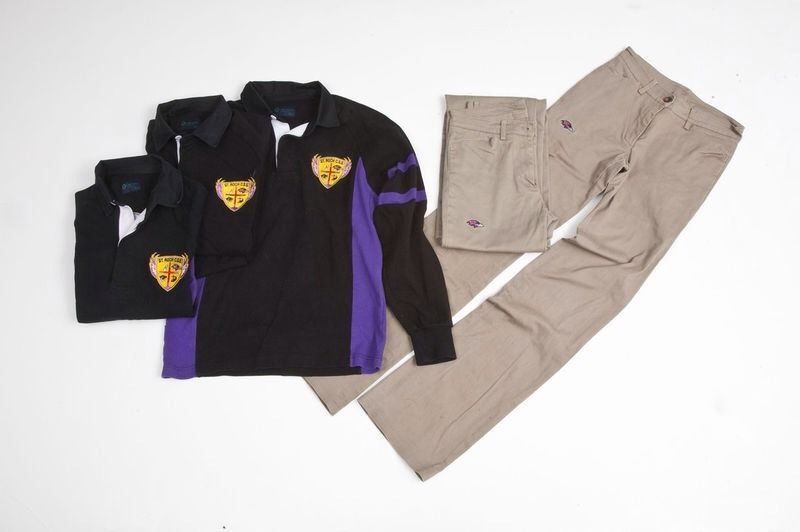
The St. Roch School Uniform

St. Roch requires all students to wear the school uniform, which consists of a black rugby shirt with purple stripes and school emblem or a dry fit long sleeve golf shirt with the school emblem (As of the 2016/17 school year, a black dry-fit shirt with the school emblem has been added as an alternative option to the rugby), combined with casual beige pants embroidered with the Ravens athletic emblem. Gym uniforms consist of black printed dazzle shorts and a grey emblemed T-shirt. In the 2022/23 school year, the school added new purple shirts and black pants.

== See also ==
- Education in Ontario
- List of secondary schools in Ontario
