= St. Martin Catholic Secondary School =

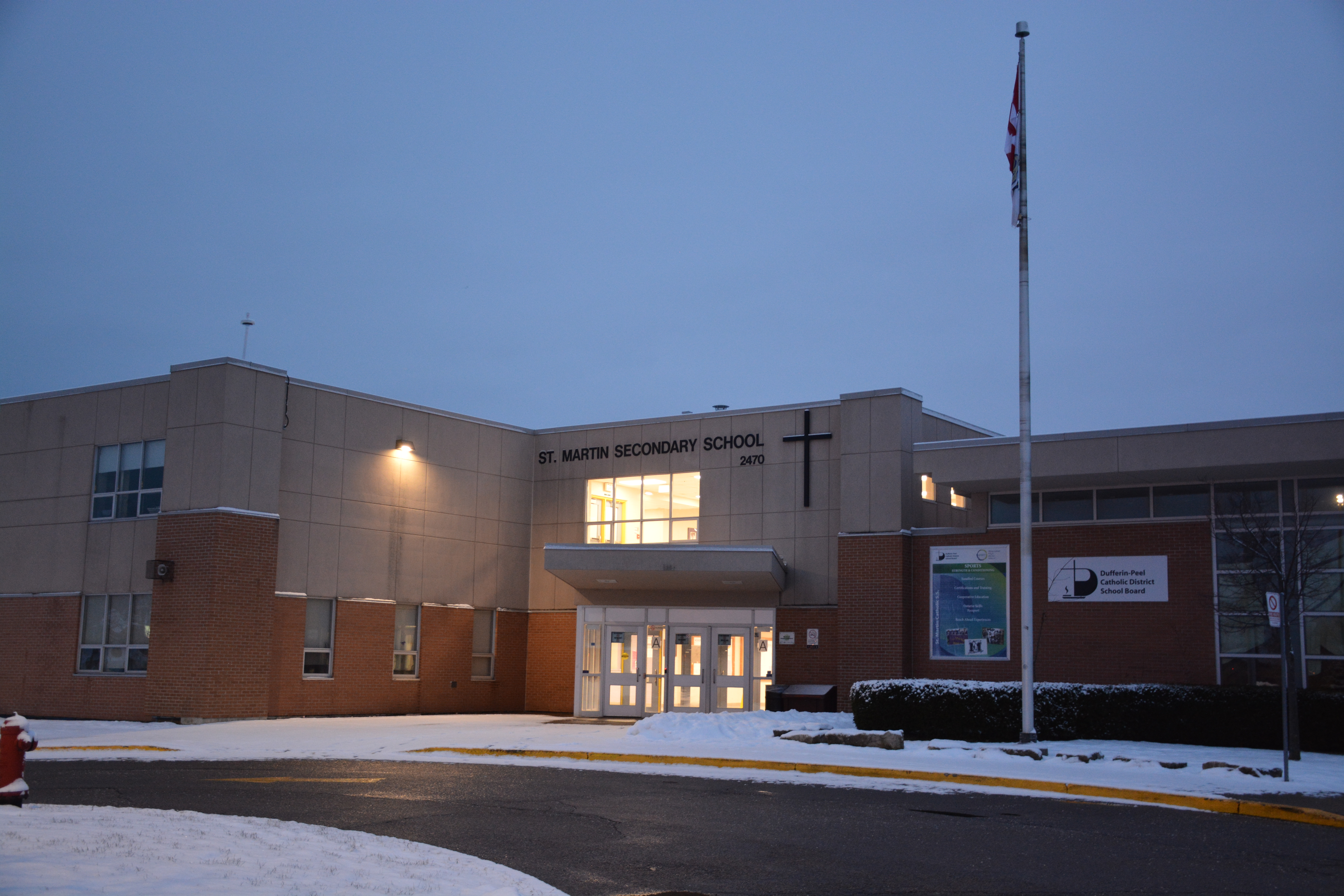
- St. Martin Catholic Secondary School's Front Entrance and Facade

Location
- 2470 Rosemary Drive; Mississauga, Ontario, L5C 1X2; Canada; 43.557°N 79.636°W

Information
- Other name: SMCSS
- Type: Separate secondary school
- Motto: Goodness, Discipline and Knowledge
- Religious affiliation: Roman Catholic
- Established: 1968
- School board: Dufferin-Peel Catholic District School Board
- Superintendent: Deborah Finegan-Downey
- Area trustee: Luz del Rosario (Ward 6) Bruno Iannicca (Ward 7)
- School number: 823953
- Principal: Michael Freitas
- Grades: 9 to 12
- Enrolment: 1088 (2019)
- Area: Mississauga South
- Colours: Purple and Gold
- Mascot: Marty the Mustang
- Team name: Mustangs
- Feeder to: St. Gerard, St. John XXIII, St. Jerome, Mary Fix, St. Catherine Of Siena
- Website: www.dpcdsb.org/MARTN

St. Martin Catholic Secondary School is a separate Roman Catholic secondary school located in the Erindale neighbourhood of Mississauga, Ontario, Canada. It is under the jurisdiction of the Dufferin-Peel Catholic District School Board. The current principal is Michael Freitas. The school has approximately 1088 students (2019).

The school offers a Specialist High Skills Major (SHSM) in Sports, and Hospitality and Tourism.

== Adult School chain ==
- St. Oscar Romero Catholic Secondary School

== Elementary feeder schools ==
- Mary Fix Catholic School
- St. Catherine of Siena Separate School
- St. Gerard Elementary School
- St. Jerome Catholic School
- St. John XXIII Catholic School
- Philip Pocock Catholic Secondary School (For Extended French)

== History ==
St. Martin Catholic Secondary School was founded in 1968 as St. Martin Senior School. Grade 7 students were taught at St. Francis School in the gym and Grade 8 students were taught at St. Catherine School in the gym until the new St. Martin Senior School was ready for occupancy sometime in October. The first graduating class attended St. Martin School for seven years, from grade 7 to 13.

Since 1968, St. Martin Catholic Secondary School has stood on Rosemary Drive. Every year, students were told that St. Martin's were on the top of the list for renovation. In 2000, the time came and plans for the new building were drawn up. In the school year 2000–2001, students studied at the SMSS Streetsville Campus waiting for the building to be reconstructed. In September 2001, the new St. Martin's building was finished.

It is the oldest high school in the Dufferin-Peel Catholic District School Board; it celebrated its 50th anniversary during the school year of 2018–2019.

== Notable alumni ==
- Jordan Balazovic
- Katrina Cameron
- Cheryl Pounder
- Naz Mitrou-Long
- Gavin McCallum
- Philip Tomasino

== See also ==
- Education in Ontario
- List of secondary schools in Ontario
