= St. Rose of Lima Catholic School =

St. Rose of Lima Catholic School may refer to:

- St. Rose of Lima Catholic School in Houston, Texas, United States
- St. Rose of Lima School - Toronto Catholic District School Board in Bendale, Scarborough, Toronto, Ontario
- St. Rose of Lima School - Dufferin-Peel Catholic District School Board in Mississauga, Ontario
- St. Rose of Lima Catholic School in Simi Valley California
