= Chris Greaves =

Chris Greaves may refer to:

- Chris Greaves (Canadian football) (born 1987), Canadian football offensive lineman
- Chris Greaves (cricketer) (born 1990), Scottish cricketer
