= St. Oscar Romero Catholic Secondary School =

St. Oscar Romero Catholic Secondary School, Blessed Archbishop Romero Catholic Secondary School, or Archbishop Romero Catholic Secondary School may refer to:

== Canada ==
- St. Oscar Romero Catholic Secondary School (Mississauga)
- St. Oscar Romero Catholic Secondary School (Toronto)

== United Kingdom ==
- St Oscar Romero Catholic School, West Sussex

== See also ==
- St. Oscar Romero Catholic High School, Edmonton
