= John Cabot Catholic Secondary School =

Location
- 635 Willowbank Trail; Mississauga, Ontario, L4W 3L6; Canada; 43.6128°N 79.6205°W

Information
- School type: Separate high school
- Religious affiliation: Roman Catholic
- School board: Dufferin-Peel Catholic District School Board
- Superintendent: Cairine MacDonald
- Principal: Sheena Agius
- Grades: 9 to 12
- Enrolment: 669 (As of March 22, 2022)
- Language: English
- Team name: Colts
- Website: https://cabot.dpcdsb.org/

John Cabot Catholic Secondary School is located in Mississauga, Ontario, Canada. It is a separate Catholic high school within the Dufferin-Peel Catholic District School Board. The school mascot is the Colt.

== History ==
In 1997, the Dufferin-Peel trustees named the school in recognition of the 500th anniversary of John Cabot's famous North American landing. John Cabot Catholic Secondary School's original building was founded in 1997. It was previously a holding site for other high schools such as St. Francis Xavier Secondary School, St. Joseph's Secondary School and Father Michael Goetz Secondary School. Joseph Geiser was the founding principal and introduced the school's motto of 'Faith, Hope and Charity'.

In the spring of 2003, the school moved to a Streetsville (holding school) campus on Mississauga Road while a new facility was constructed. Students entered the new facility in September 2004.

The first student body voted on a mascot, the Colt, to represent the student athletics. A big colt was painted on the gym walls to promote school athletics. The school currently has sports teams in a number of sports, such as soccer, basketball, badminton, volleyball, and softball.

There are also a number of clubs available for students to join. Canada wide clubs, such as The Breakfast Club are available. Additionally, the eco club, choir, DECA, reading clubs, poetry club and more are available.

There is also yearly talent shows, to showcase Cabot student talent and get students engaged.

The school hosts a yearly poetry slam in the lecture hall, which attracts students from John Cabot as well as from other schools in the board to perform.

The school also hosts a yearly musical production, which is entirely original. It is written and directed by the school. The production showcases Cabot student talent, from acting to singing to dancing, as well as art pieces from art students.

== Notable alumni ==
- Chris Campoli, a professional hockey player for the Montreal Canadiens
- Fito Blanko, a Latin Grammy Nominated Singer/SongWriter Recording Artist
- Kirk Diamond, a Juno Award Winning Singer/Songwriter Recording Artist

== See also ==
- Education in Ontario
- List of secondary schools in Ontario
