= Philip Pocock Catholic Secondary School =

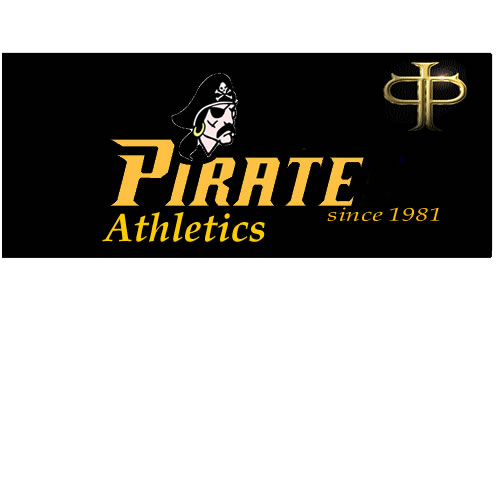

Location
- 4555 Tomken Road; Mississauga, Ontario, L4W 1J9; Canada; 43.625°N 79.626°W

Information
- School type: Catholic High School
- Religious affiliation: Roman Catholic
- Founded: 1981
- School board: Dufferin-Peel Catholic District School Board
- Superintendent: Martine Lewis
- Area trustee: Mario Pascucci; Stefano Pascucci
- School number: 751430
- Principal: Frances Campese
- Grades: 9-12
- Enrolment: approx. 1,350 (2018)
- Language: English
- Area: Mississauga East
- Colours: Black and Gold
- Mascot: Pirate
- Team name: Pocock Pirates
- Website: www.dpcdsb.org/POCOK

Philip Pocock Catholic Secondary School (alternatively called as Philip Pocock, PPCSS, PP, Philip Pocock CSS, or Pocock) is a Roman Catholic high school in Mississauga, Ontario, Canada. It is operated by the Dufferin-Peel Catholic District School Board and has approximately 1,350 students. The school includes an Extended French Program as well as an Advanced Placement Program for Mathematics and the Sciences (Biology, Physics, Chemistry). The school building is similar to that of St. Joseph Secondary School in Mississauga, which was modelled after Philip Pocock.

The school's athletes are called the "Pocock Pirates."

== History ==
The first Philip Pocock location opened in 1981 by the Dufferin-Peel Separate School Board and was at the site where John Cabot Catholic Secondary School is currently located. Then, due to an increasing student population, Philip Pocock's grade 11-13 students were temporarily located at Vincent Massey Collegiate Institute in Etobicoke, Ontario, from 1987 to 1992 until construction of the new, permanent third location was completed at the intersection of Tomken Road and Eglinton Avenue in Mississauga. This third and current location at Tomken and Eglinton opened in 1992. Presently, Massey became the Metropolitan Separate School Board (now the Toronto Catholic District School Board)'s Michael Power/St. Joseph High School campus in 1993.

=== Origins ===
Philip Francis Pocock was born in St. Thomas, Ontario, on July 2, 1906. He studied Theology at St. Peter's Seminary, London, and was ordained on June 14, 1930, by Bp. Denis P. O'Connor of Peterborough at St. Peter's Cathedral, London. In 1933, Father Pocock went to Rome for graduate studies and obtained the degree of Doctor of Canon Law. On April 7, 1944, he was appointed Bishop of Saskatoon. On June 16, 1951, Bp. Pocock was named Apostolic Administrator of Winnipeg, and on August 6 of the same year, Coadjutor Archbishop of Winnipeg. Abp. Pocock succeeded to the See as Archbishop on January 14, 1952. Due to Card. McGuigan's poor health, Abp. Pocock was appointed Coadjutor Archbishop of Toronto on February 18, 1961. He succeeded to the See of Toronto and became Archbishop upon Cardinal McGuigan's resignation on March 30, 1971. On April 29, 1978, Archbishop Pocock resigned the See of Toronto and took up residence at St. Mary's Parish, Brampton. He remained active as a priest, celebrating mass at elementary schools, confirming students, and visiting a senior citizens' home as well as performing his parish duties. He died on September 6, 1984, and was interred in Holy Cross Cemetery, Thornhill.

=== Athletics ===
The Philip Pocock Pirates compete locally in the Region of Peel Athletics Association (ROPSSAA) and provincially with OFSAA. Philip Pocock Athletics has a storied past with many ROPSSAA, DPAA, and TDCAA championships. Some of the notable championship teams include boys football, which have achieved 3 championships at both the junior and senior levels; Track and Field, which achieved overall ROPSSAA championships in 1999–2002; and girls rugby, which won ROPSSAA gold in 2008.

=== Feeder Schools ===
- St. Alfred Catholic Elementary School
- St. Basil Catholic Elementary School
- St. Sofia Catholic Elementary School (Ukrainian Catholic)
- St. Thomas More Catholic Elementary School
- St. Jude Separate School
- Sts. Martha and Mary Catholic Elementary School
- St. Philip Catholic Elementary School

== Extended French Program ==
The Extended French Program in the province of Ontario typically begins in grade five and continues until the end of high school. Philip Pocock encourages its Extended French students to participate in French language and French public speaking contests, sponsored by Canadian Parents for French.

== French Immersion Program ==
As of September 2019, Dufferin-Peel Catholic District School Board added French Immersion Program due to a substantial demand for the program. In subsequent years, it will be added to Grade 12.

== Notable alumni and teachers ==
- Zac Rinaldo, hockey player with the Boston Bruins
- Cody Bass, hockey player with the Nashville Predators organization
- Luca Caputi, former hockey player with the Anaheim Ducks organization
- Jason Spezza, hockey player with the Toronto Maple Leafs
- Anthony Carelli, WWE professional wrestler under the ring name Santino Marella
- Natalia Kusendova, Ontario PC Member of Provincial Parliament for Mississauga Centre, and Minister of Long Term Care in the province of Ontario.
- John Tavares, the National Lacrosse League's all-time career goals, assists, and points leader; all with the Buffalo Bandits. Alumnus and currently teaches mathematics at the school.

== See also ==
- Education in Ontario
- List of secondary schools in Ontario
