= St. Francis Xavier Secondary School (Mississauga) =

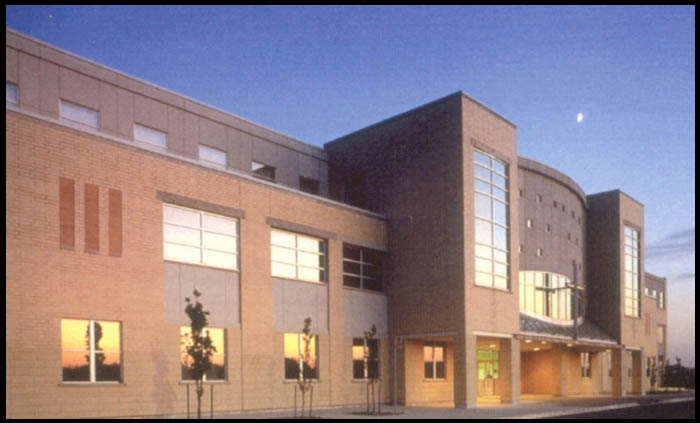

Location
- 50 Bristol Road West; Mississauga, Ontario, L5R 3K3; Canada; 43.61273°N 79.66426°W

Information
- School type: Separate High School
- Religious affiliation: Roman Catholic
- Founded: September 1990
- School board: Dufferin-Peel Catholic District School Board
- Superintendent: Wayne Brunton
- Principal: Ferdinando Tantalo
- Chaplain: Betty-Anne Pickett
- Grades: 9 to 12
- Enrolment: 1840 (As of October 29, 2021)
- Language: English (French, and Spanish included in school curriculum)
- Colours: Blue and Maize
- Team name: Xavier Tigers
- Special Programs: International Baccalaureate Diploma Program (IB) and Specialist High School Majors Program (SHSM) for Hospitality, Transportation and Health and Wellness

St. Francis Xavier Secondary School, colloquially abbreviated as FX, is a Catholic high school in Mississauga, Ontario, Canada, overseen by the Dufferin-Peel Catholic District School Board. As of October 29, 2021, it has 1,840 students, about 130 teaching and support staff, and a childcare centre. The school mascot is the Tiger. The school has an International Baccalaureate (IB) diploma program and Specialist High Skills Major programs for Health & wellness, Hospitality & Tourism, and Transportation.

The school is located in St. Francis Xavier Parish in the Archdiocese of Toronto. The school catchment includes graduates of St. Hilary, St. Matthew, St. Jude, San Lorenzo Ruiz Elementary schools, St. Valentine students living east of Mavis Rd. and is the most common high school for graduates of Fairwind Senior Public School and Bristol Road Middle School, even though they are in Peel District School Board.

== History ==
The school opened in September 1990 on a temporary site where John Cabot Catholic Secondary School is now located. After two years, it moved into its permanent building near the corner of Bristol and Hurontario. As part of the Dufferin-Peel portable replacement plan, the school received a three-floor, 22-room addition that was completed in June 2001. Recently, further growth of the school has necessitated more portable units: five were added in 2006, five more in 2007, and one more in 2009.

Construction of Saviour of the World Chinese Catholic Church started during the 2002–03 school year. The Church now shares property with the school.

== Feeder Schools ==
- San Lorenzo Ruiz Catholic Elementary School
- St. Hilary Catholic Elementary School
- St. Jude Catholic Elementary School
- St. Matthew Catholic Elementary School
- St. Valentine Catholic Elementary School (East of Mavis Road)

== Sports ==
The St. Francis Xavier Tigers have many sports teams and clubs, including the following during the 2019–2020 school year (there are both boys and girls teams unless otherwise noted):

- badminton (senior and junior)
- baseball (boys varsity)
- basketball (senior and junior boys and varsity girls)
- cricket (varsity boys)
- cross-country running (senior, junior and midget)
- curling (senior open boys, junior novice/senior open girls and junior novice/senior novice mixed)
- flag football (varsity girls)
- football (varsity boys)
- golf (varsity boys and varsity girls)
- rugby (senior and junior girls)
- rugby sevens (senior and junior girls)
- soccer (senior and junior boys, varsity girls)
- softball – slow pitch (varsity girls)
- swimming (senior and junior)
- table tennis (varsity boys)
- tennis (senior and junior)
- track and field (senior, junior and midget)
- volleyball (varsity boys, senior and junior girls)
- wrestling (senior and junior)

The school is well known in GTA basketball circles for the Rimrocker basketball tournaments it hosts every year: an 8-team Senior Girls Rimrocker in October and 16-team Senior Boys and Junior Boys Rimrocker tournaments now held concurrently in mid-December after being held separately for 14 years. The school has also hosted 6 OFSAA Championships: 2011 Boys' AAAA Soccer, 2014 Boys' AAAA Basketball, 2015 Girls' AAAA/AAA and AA/A Rugby, 2018 Girls' AAA Rugby and 2019 Girls' AAA Basketball.

Recent ROPSSAA and OFSAA championships include:

2019–2020: Senior Girls Sevens Rugby; Senior Girls Flag Football; Senior Girls Basketball; Junior Boys Cross-Country Team (OFSAA Silver); Junior Novice Girls Curling; Junior Boys Doubles Tennis

2018–2019: Senior Girls Wrestling Team (OFSAA Silver); Junior Combined Wrestling Team; Junior Girls Wrestling Team; Junior Boys Badminton Team; Midget Boys Cross Country Team; Senior Novice Mixed Curling; Junior Novice Girls Curling; Senior Girls Tier 2 Rugby

2017–2018: Junior Boys Swimming Team; Senior Girls Wrestling Team; Senior Mixed Curling; Senior Boys Basketball (OFSAA Silver Medallists).

2016–2017: Over-all Tennis Team; Senior Girls Tennis Team; Junior Girls Tennis Team; Swimming U14 Girls Team; Senior Girls Volleyball; Junior Boys Soccer.

2015–2016: Senior Girls Volleyball; Junior Boys Basketball

2014–2015: Boys Tier 2 Football; Junior Girls Volleyball; Senior Boys Rugby; Boys Tier 2 Baseball

2013–14: Junior Boys Cross Country; Senior Badminton; Junior Girls Volleyball

2010–11: Midget Boys Cross Country;

2008–09: Junior Girls Wrestling Team

2007–08: Junior Boys Football; Girls Varsity Tier 2 Hockey; Varsity Boys Tier 2 Baseball

2006–07: Junior Boys, Senior Girls and Overall Combined Tennis; Senior Tier 2 Football

2005–06: Girls Wrestling Team; Wrestling Individual – Isaias Morales, Melissa DeCiantis, Latacha Smellie, Tameka Bromfield; Track and Field – Midget Boys 3000m

2004–05: Junior Boys Tennis; Girls Wrestling Team; Wrestling Individual – Latacha Smellie, Chatele O'Sullivan (OFSAA Silver Medallist); Junior Boys Soccer; Track and Field – Junior Girls 100m 200m Athena McBean, 4 × 100 m Ashley Lapinski Athena McBean Jamillah Mensah Christa Acquah, Shot Put Kristen Obrochta, Junior Boys High Jump Darren Duncan

2003–04: Senior Tier 2 Football

2002–03: Senior Girls Basketball; Senior Girls Tier 2 Volleyball

2001–02: Senior Girls Basketball

2000–01: Junior Boys Hockey; Senior Girls Team Tracki

1999-00: Senior Girls Basketball; Junior Boys Basketball; Senior Boys Soccer; Junior Boys Soccer

1998–99: Senior Boys Soccer (OFSAA AAA Champions); Junior Boys Team Track

1997–98: Boys Cricket; Junior Girls Team Track; Senior Boys Soccer (OFSAA AAA Silver Medallist)

== Music programs ==
The Music program at Xavier currently involves over 250 students a year. Ensembles that perform there include:

- Junior Band
- Senior Band
- Jazz Band
- Grade 10 Guitar Ensemble
- Grade 11/12 Guitar Ensemble
- Chamber Choir

The bands perform concerts annually and attend festivals and trips abroad.

== Incidents ==
On May 31, 2017, a student was stabbed following an altercation with other students, leading to the lockdown of the school and Hold and Secures in other schools in the area.

== Notable alumni ==
- Maurice Forbes, Hamilton Tiger-Cats player
- Robyn Gayle, Canadian women's national soccer team
- Chris Greaves, B.C Lions player
- Carmelina Moscato, Canadian women's national soccer team
- D.J. Sackey, Toronto Argonauts player
- Rico Tan, Welterweight boxer
- Sean Durzi, NHL player for the Utah Mammoth

== See also ==
- Education in Ontario
- List of secondary schools in Ontario
