= Selvish Capers =

American football player (born 1986)

No. 60
- Position: Offensive tackle

Personal information
- Born: November 13, 1986 (age 39); Metairie, Louisiana, U.S.
- Listed height: 6 ft 5 in (1.96 m)
- Listed weight: 310 lb (141 kg)

Career information
- High school: St. Augustine (New Orleans, Louisiana)
- College: West Virginia
- NFL draft: 2010: 7th round, 231st overall pick

Career history
- Washington Redskins (2010–2011)*; New York Giants (2011–2013); Edmonton Eskimos (2014–2015); Winnipeg Blue Bombers (2015)
- * Offseason or practice squad member only

Awards and highlights
- Super Bowl champion (XLVI); Second-team All-Big East Conference (2009)

Career NFL statistics
- Games played: 3
- Stats at Pro Football Reference

Selvish Capers (born November 13, 1986) is an American former professional football player who was an offensive tackle in the National Football League (NFL). He played college football for the West Virginia Mountaineers. and was selected by the Washington Redskins in the seventh round of the 2010 NFL draft.

== Early life ==
Capers was born in Metairie, Louisiana, and attended St. Augustine High School in New Orleans, Louisiana, where he was an All-Louisiana tight end. As a senior, he recorded twenty-one catches for 276 yards and four touchdowns, which earned him first team all-district, all-metro and all-state honors. He was also a three-year starter on the basketball team. Capers and D'Andre Crittenden were the only boys to start three years in football and basketball.

Considered only a two-star recruit by Rivals.com, Capers was not ranked among the nation's top offensive line prospects in 2005, due to his tightend status. He chose West Virginia over Southern Miss, among others.

== College career ==
Capers redshirted his initial year at West Virginia, and saw limited time at tight end in 2006. During the offseason, he moved from tight end to the tackle position, where he started the 2007 season as the backup. He then earned the starting job against Mississippi State and kept it the rest of his college career. Overall, he played in all 13 games and started six during his sophomore year. Capers anchored an offensive line that helped pave the way for the Mountaineers offense to produce two 1,000-yard rushers in Steve Slaton and Pat White. He saw limited action in West Virginia's appearance in the 2008 Fiesta Bowl, due to a sprained ankle.

As a junior in 2008, Capers started all 13 games and saw action in more than 775 plays, including a season high 86 against Cincinnati. He collected 56 knockdowns, including a season high eight knockdowns against Connecticut. During his senior season, Capers was named Second Team All-Big East Conference in a poll by the conference's head coaches.

== Professional career ==
Capers was projected to be a second or third round draft pick until he under-achieved in the Senior Bowl and the NFL Scouting Combine.

He was selected by the Redskins in the seventh round (231st overall) of the 2010 NFL draft. Capers was released from the Washington Redskins on September 4, 2010. He was signed to the Redskins' practice squad on September 5, 2010. He was released by the Redskins on September 4, 2011.

Capers signed with the New York Giants' practice squad on October 4, 2011. He was re-signed to the practice squad for the 2012 season on September 1, 2012. Capers was later signed to active roster during the second half of the season. He was released by the Giants due to injury, on September 9, 2013.

Capers signed with the Edmonton Eskimos of the Canadian Football League (CFL) on March 13, 2014. He played in nine games, all starts, for the Eskimos in 2014.

On September 9, 2015, Capers, along with a second round pick in the 2016 CFL draft, were traded to the Winnipeg Blue Bombers for Christopher Greaves. Capers started in all five games he played for the Blue Bombers in 2015.
