= Oshae Brissett =

Canadian basketball player (born 1998)

- Brissett with Maccabi Tel Aviv in 2026

No. 10 – Maccabi Tel Aviv
- Position: Power forward / small forward
- League: Israeli Basketball Premier League; EuroLeague

Personal information
- Born: June 20, 1998 (age 28) Toronto, Ontario, Canada
- Listed height: 2.04 m (6 ft 8 in)
- Listed weight: 210 lb (95 kg)

Career information
- High school: St. Aloysius Gonzaga (Mississauga, Ontario); Findlay Prep (Henderson, Nevada); Athlete Institute (Mono, Ontario)
- College: Syracuse (2017–2019)
- NBA draft: 2019: undrafted
- Playing career: 2019–present

Career history
- 2019–2020: Toronto Raptors
- 2019–2020: →Raptors 905
- 2021: Fort Wayne Mad Ants
- 2021–2023: Indiana Pacers
- 2023–2024: Boston Celtics
- 2025: Long Island Nets
- 2025: Philadelphia 76ers
- 2025–present: Maccabi Tel Aviv

Career highlights
- NBA champion (2024); Israeli Basketball Premier League champion (2026); All-NBA G League Second Team (2021); Atlantic Coast Conference All-Freshman Team (2018)
- Stats at NBA.com
- Stats at Basketball Reference

Oshae Jahve Brissett (/oʊˈʃeɪ brɪˈsɛt/ oh-SHAY brih-SET; born June 20, 1998) is a Canadian professional basketball player for Maccabi Tel Aviv of the Israeli Basketball Premier League and the EuroLeague.

He played college basketball in Division I for the Syracuse Orange for two years, and was named to the 2018 Atlantic Coast Conference All-Freshman Team. He then signed with the Toronto Raptors as an undrafted free agent in 2019, and subsequently the Indiana Pacers in 2021. Brissett joined the Boston Celtics in 2023, with whom he won an NBA championship in 2024. He won an Israeli Basketball Premier League championship in 2026 with Maccabi Tel Aviv.

== Early life ==
Brissett was born in Toronto, Canada, to McKeitha McFarlane and Bernard Brissett, who had separated around the time of his birth. He is of Jamaican descent.

Brissett spent the first four years of his life living in the Jane and Finch neighbourhood of Toronto before moving to the city of Mississauga. He initially attended high school at St. Aloysius Gonzaga Secondary School in Mississauga for one year.

Brissett then moved away from home at 15 years of age to attend Findlay Prep in Henderson, Nevada, in order to hone his skills against better competition and to improve his chances of being recruited by a major college. On a layup before his 11th game of the season, he landed poorly and broke his right knee, which resulted in him missing the rest of the season.

After Findlay Prep, Brissett returned to Canada and spent a year at the Athlete Institute in Mono, Ontario. There, he excelled and was team captain. He was named 2017 Biosteel All-Canadian High School Player of the Year.

== College career ==
Brissett committed to play for the Syracuse University Orange which offered him a scholarship, after receiving offers from USC, Oregon, and Memphis. He entered the Orange starting lineup immediately, providing an interior presence alongside guards Tyus Battle and Frank Howard. Brissett averaged 14.9 points, 8.8 rebounds (fifth in the Atlantic Coast Conference (ACC), 0.9 assists, and 1.2 steals per game in his first collegiate season. He was named to the 2018 ACC All-Freshman Team.

Following Brissett's freshman season, there was speculation that he could test the waters in the 2018 NBA draft. However, he announced his intention to return to Syracuse for his sophomore season in April 2018. As a sophomore, Brissett averaged 12.4 points, 7.5 rebounds, 1.8 assists, and 1.0 steals per game. After the season, he declared his eligibility for the NBA Draft and forfeited his remaining two years of collegiate eligibility. However, he was not drafted.

== Professional career ==
=== Toronto Raptors (2019–2020) ===
On July 23, 2019, Brissett signed with the Toronto Raptors of the National Basketball Association. On October 21, his contract was converted to a two-way contract. Under the terms of the deal, he would split time between the Raptors and their NBA G League affiliate, the Raptors 905.

He made his NBA debut on November 19 against the Miami Heat. On January 7, 2020, Brissett played his best game of the season, scoring a then-career high 12 points and grabbing six rebounds, one assist, and one steal in a 101–99 loss against the Portland Trail Blazers. In 2019–20, with the Raptors he averaged 7.1 minutes, 1.9 points, and 1.4 rebounds per game, in 19 games off the bench. In the G League, Brissett averaged 15.9 points, 7.1 rebounds, 1.7 assists, and 1.0 steals per game over 28 games played (21 of them starts).

Following the season, the Raptors extended a qualifying offer to him, making him a restricted free agent. He later signed a partially guaranteed, two-year contract extension. Brissett was waived by the team at the end of training camp preceding the 2020––21 season.

=== Fort Wayne Mad Ants (2021) ===
In January 2021, Brissett was selected 21st overall in the first 2021 NBA G League draft by the G League Fort Wayne Mad Ants. He played for the Mad Ants in 12 games and averaged 18.6 points, 9.8 rebounds, and 2.2 assists in 34.6 minutes per game, earning a spot on the All-NBA G League Second Team.

=== Indiana Pacers (2021–2023) ===
On April 1, 2021, Brissett signed a 10-day contract with the Indiana Pacers of the NBA. Ten days later, he signed a second 10-day contract.

On April 20, 2021, Brissett made his first career start in a 109–94 loss to the San Antonio Spurs, scoring 13 points on 5-of-8 shooting from the field and 3-of-5 from three, along with six rebounds and a steal. The next day, he signed a three-year deal with the team. He started that night's game against the Oklahoma City Thunder scoring 23 points, grabbing 12 rebounds, and recording 3 blocks. On May 18, 2021, Brissett scored 23 points with five rebounds and two assists in a 144–117 play-in win over the Charlotte Hornets. In 2020–21, he averaged 24.7 minutes, 10.9 points, 5.5 rebounds, and 1.1 blocks per game, as he shot 48% from the floor and 42% from three-point range, in 21 games (16 of them starts).

In 2021–22, he averaged 23.3 minutes, 9.1 points, 5.3 rebounds, and 1.1 assists per game, in 67 games (25 of them starts).

In 2022–23, he averaged 16.7 minutes, 6.1 points, and 3.4 rebound per game, in 65 games (2 of them starts).

=== Boston Celtics (2023–2024) ===
On July 6, 2023, Brissett signed with the Boston Celtics. On October 27, he made his Celtics debut in the first game of the 2023–24 season in a 119–111 win against the Miami Heat, scoring 2 points and pulling down 5 rebounds. In the post-season, during Game 2 of the Eastern Conference Finals against his former Indiana Pacers, Brissett played a key role in the Celtics' defense where he held the Pacers to just 1-for-3 shooting and made 3 steals and grabbed 3 rebounds during his 12 minutes on the court, expanding the team's 7–0 run to 18–0 in the third quarter of the game. He reached the NBA Finals with the Celtics in 2024. The Celtics defeated the Dallas Mavericks in 5 games to give Brissett an NBA championship.

With the Celtics, he averaged 11.5 minutes, 3.7 points, and 2.9 rebounds per game, in 55 games (1 start). He declined a $2.5 million player option on June 23, 2024, to become an unrestricted free agent.

=== Long Island Nets (2025) ===
On January 18, 2025, Brissett signed with the Long Island Nets of the NBA G League. With the team, he averaged 25.5 minutes, 12.1 points, 5.4 rebounds, 1.6 assists, and 1.3 steals per game, in 11 games (2 starts).

=== Philadelphia 76ers (2025) ===
On March 14, 2025, Brissett signed a 10-day contract with the Philadelphia 76ers. In 6 appearances (2 starts) with the 76ers, Brissett averaged 23.7 minutes, 8.7 points, 3.7 rebounds, and 0.7 assists, while shooting 49% from the floor.

=== Maccabi Tel Aviv (2025–present) ===
On July 15, 2025, Brissett signed a two-year deal with Maccabi Tel Aviv of the Israeli Basketball Premier League and the EuroLeague. Brissett said: "I'm joining the most decorated club on the planet, in order to win some more trophies."

In the 2025–26 season, Brissett averaged 23.9 minutes, 9.5 points, and 5.6 rebounds per game while shooting 91% from the free throw line, in 59 games (27 starts). He elevated his performance during the domestic postseason, averaging 12.0 points and 7.1 rebounds per game. He helped Maccabi Tel Aviv win the Israeli Basketball Premier League championship and the Israel State Cup, and he himself was voted to the Eurobasket.com All-Israeli League All-Imports Team and to the Eurobasket.com All-Israeli League Third Team.

Brissett re-signed a two-year extension with Maccabi Tel Aviv on July 1, 2026.

== National team career ==
Brissett competed for Canada, which won a silver medal, in the 2016 FIBA Americas Under-18 Championship in Valdivia, Chile, at 17 years of age. He averaged 27 minutes, 16 points (2nd in the tournament), 8 rebounds, 2 steals, and 1 assist per game.

On May 24, 2022, Brissett agreed to a three-year commitment to play with the Canadian senior men's national team.

== Personal life ==
Brissett has an older brother named Dejon Brissett who was drafted second overall as a wide receiver in the 2020 CFL draft by the Toronto Argonauts, and whoas of 2026 plays Canadian football for the Calgary Stampeders of the Canadian Football League (CFL).

== Career statistics ==
Legend
| GP | Games played | GS | Games started | MPG | Minutes per game |
| FG% | Field goal percentage | 3P% | 3-point field goal percentage | FT% | Free throw percentage |
| RPG | Rebounds per game | APG | Assists per game | SPG | Steals per game |
| BPG | Blocks per game | PPG | Points per game | **Bold** | Career high |
| † | Won an NBA championship |

=== NBA ===
==== Regular season ====
| Year | Team | GP | GS | MPG | FG% | 3P% | FT% | RPG | APG | SPG | BPG | PPG |
|---|---|---|---|---|---|---|---|---|---|---|---|---|
| 2019–20 | Toronto | 19 | 0 | 7.1 | .361 | .200 | **.800** | 1.4 | .4 | .2 | .1 | 1.9 |
| 2020–21 | Indiana | 21 | 16 | **24.7** | .483 | **.423** | .769 | **5.5** | .9 | **.9** | **1.0** | **10.9** |
| 2021–22 | Indiana | **67** | **25** | 23.3 | .411 | .350 | .695 | 5.3 | **1.1** | .7 | .4 | 9.1 |
| 2022–23 | Indiana | 65 | 2 | 16.7 | .386 | .310 | .717 | 3.4 | .7 | .5 | .2 | 6.1 |
| 2023–24† | Boston | 55 | 1 | 11.5 | .444 | .273 | .602 | 2.9 | .8 | .3 | .1 | 3.7 |
| 2024–25 | Philadelphia | 6 | 2 | 23.7 | **.487** | .333 | .571 | 3.7 | .7 | .7 | .5 | 8.7 |
| Career | | 233 | 46 | 17.5 | .419 | .337 | .694 | 3.9 | .8 | .5 | .3 | 6.6 |

==== Playoffs ====
| Year | Team | GP | GS | MPG | FG% | 3P% | FT% | RPG | APG | SPG | BPG | PPG |
|---|---|---|---|---|---|---|---|---|---|---|---|---|
| 2024† | Boston | 10 | 0 | 5.5 | .545 | 1.000 | .500 | 1.4 | .0 | .3 | .2 | 1.6 |
| Career | | 10 | 0 | 5.5 | .545 | 1.000 | .500 | 1.4 | .0 | .3 | .2 | 1.6 |

=== College ===
| Year | Team | GP | GS | MPG | FG% | 3P% | FT% | RPG | APG | SPG | BPG | PPG |
|---|---|---|---|---|---|---|---|---|---|---|---|---|
| 2017–18 | Syracuse | **37** | **37** | **38.1** | .354 | **.331** | **.787** | **8.8** | .9 | **1.2** | **.8** | **14.9** |
| 2018–19 | Syracuse | 34 | 34 | 33.0 | **.393** | .270 | .660 | 7.5 | **1.8** | 1.0 | **.8** | 12.4 |
| Career | | 71 | 71 | 35.7 | .371 | .307 | .736 | 8.2 | 1.3 | 1.1 | .8 | 13.7 |
