= Iona Catholic Secondary School =

Catholic high school in Mississauga, Canada

Location
- 2170 South Sheridan Way; Mississauga, Ontario, L5J 2M4; Canada

Information
- School type: Catholic School, High School
- Religious affiliation: Catholic
- Founded: 1993
- School board: Dufferin-Peel Catholic District School Board
- Superintendent: Silvana Gos
- Area trustee: Sharon Hobin, Mario Pascucci
- Principal: .
- Grades: 9 to 12
- Enrolment: About 750
- Language: English, programs include French, Spanish
- Campus: Suburban
- Area: Clarkson
- Colours: White, teal and orange
- Team name: Iona Dolphins
- Website: www.dpcdsb.org/IONAS/

Iona Catholic Secondary School is a high school in Mississauga, Ontario. It is one of three regional art schools in the Dufferin-Peel Catholic District School Board enrolling students from the Clarkson and Lorne Park neighborhoods.

== Arts program ==
In 2007 Iona began the Regional Arts Program for grade nine students, allowing them to take Drama, Dance, Art or Music as their major. Students submit portfolios, get interviewed and perform to be considered for entry. Iona hosts Arts Night in the Living Arts Centre.

== SHSM programs ==
The school currently offers three Specialist High Skill Majors, including Art, Justice, and Business (Marketing). Students enter the program in grade 11 and take a number of mandatory courses and certifications, resulting in a special designation on their Ontario Secondary School Diploma.

== Sports ==
In 2011, the boys' baseball team won the ROPSSAA (Region of Peel) title, the first baseball title won by the school.

In 2012, the girls' soccer team won the OFSSA (Ontario) title in Hamilton, the first soccer title won by the school.

== Notable alumni ==
- Matt Stajan, former NHL player
- Jack Hughes, current NHL player
- Quinn Hughes, current NHL player
- Katie Vincent, Olympic canoeing medalist
- Ill Scarlett, band

== Elementary feeder schools ==
- St. Christopher's Elementary School - 1195 Clarkson Rd N, Mississauga, ON L5J 2W1
- St. Helen Elementary School - 1325 Bodley Rd, Mississauga, ON L5J 3X1
- St. Luke's Elementary School - 1280 Cobalt St, Mississauga, ON L5H 4L8
- St. Francis of Assisi Elementary School - 2480 Thorn Lodge Dr, Mississauga, ON L5K 1K5
- St. Louis Elementary School - 1450 Lewisham Drive Mississauga ON , L5J 3R3

As well as others in the area.

== See also ==
- Education in Ontario
- List of secondary schools in Ontario
