= Robert F. Hall Catholic Secondary School =

Robert F. Hall C.S.S
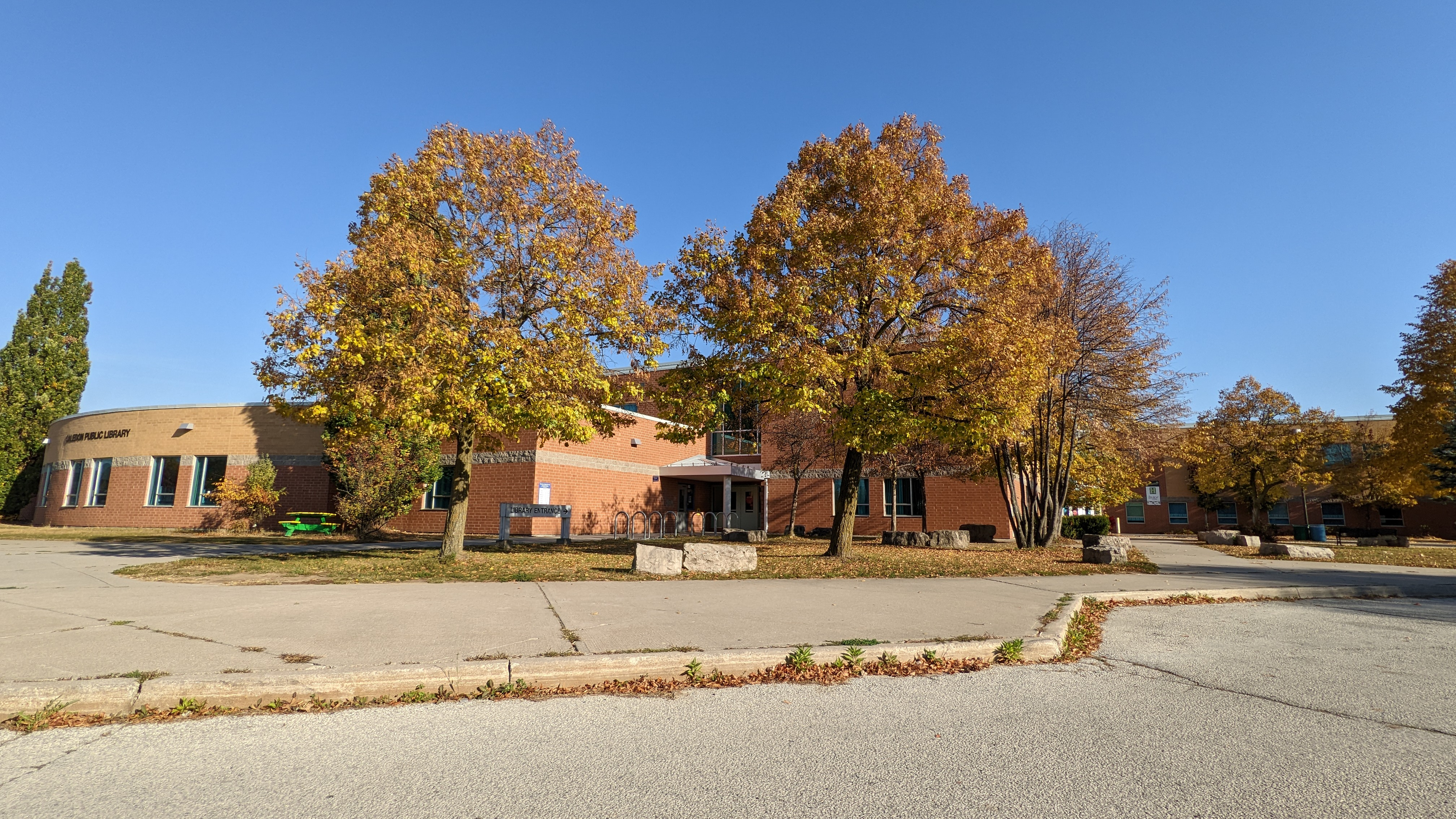

Location
- 6500 Old Church Road; Caledon East, Ontario, L7C 2Z2; Canada; 43.8800°N 79.8550°W

Information
- School type: Catholic
- Established: September 6, 1992
- School board: Dufferin-Peel Catholic District School Board
- Principal: Julian longo
- Grades: 9-12
- Enrolment: 1576 (2025-26) Previously 1,225 (2021–22)
- Colours: Green, Gold (yellow)
- Mascot: The Wolfpack
- Newspaper: The Howler
- Website: www.dpcdsb.org/RFHAL

Robert F. Hall Catholic Secondary School (frequently referred to as Hall or abbreviated as RFH) is a Catholic school located in Caledon East, Ontario, Canada. The school was named after Robert Francis (Bobby Soxer) Hall (1925–1989), the first lay person after whom a Catholic secondary school has been named in the Dufferin-Peel Catholic District School Board. The school's patron saint is St. Francis of Assisi.

== History ==
As of 1999, the school shared its library with the Town of Caledon.

The actor David Reale, best known for his roles as Benjamin in Suits, attended the school. Director, actor, and writer Karen Knox also attended the school.

== Feeder schools ==
- St. Andrew Catholic Elementary School
- St. Benedict Catholic Elementary School
- St. Cornelius Catholic Elementary School
- St. Evan Catholic Elementary School
- St. Peter Catholic Elementary School
- St. Rita Catholic Elementary School (only those students residing north of Mayfield Road)

== Enrolment ==
As of 2021–2022, Robert F. Hall Catholic Secondary School has an enrolment of 1,225 students. It is open to residents in Caledon, Orangeville, Shelburne, and other small towns in the area. The school is also open to students of the extended French program from Bolton.

== Extracurricular activities ==
There are multiple student groups, school clubs and sports teams that are currently active at Robert F. Hall. The school implemented the Link Crew program, which gives freshmen a chance to meet with senior students for some peer guidance.

Robert F. Hall has a well formed student council consisting of an average of 10 students per grade and three teacher supervisors. Executive positions include, Secretary, Treasurer, Communications Officer, President, Vice president, and or co-presidents. Student Council meets after school weekly to discuss current issues in the school and organize fun themed, or seasonal events for students. Presidents are chosen through vote every May during their spirit week.

Athletic Council is similar to student council however fund raises through buy-ins where student purchase tickets to view their fellow students play and compete against other schools in sports tournaments. Buy-ins often occur for football games over any other sport. Athletic Council also holds inter mural sports for students that occur after school where students make teams of 10 and compete against other teams in soccer. The badminton tournament is a school favorite where a student teams up with a teacher of the school and compete against another team in order to win.

AV Crew is a group of students that set up and run the technical equipment for all school events such as assemblies, presentations and awards.

Eco Crew is a club that welcomes members anytime of the year and were successful in getting the school recognized regionally for eco efforts in 2013.

== See also ==
- Education in Ontario
- List of secondary schools in Ontario
