= Jordan Balazovic =

Canadian baseball player (born 1998)

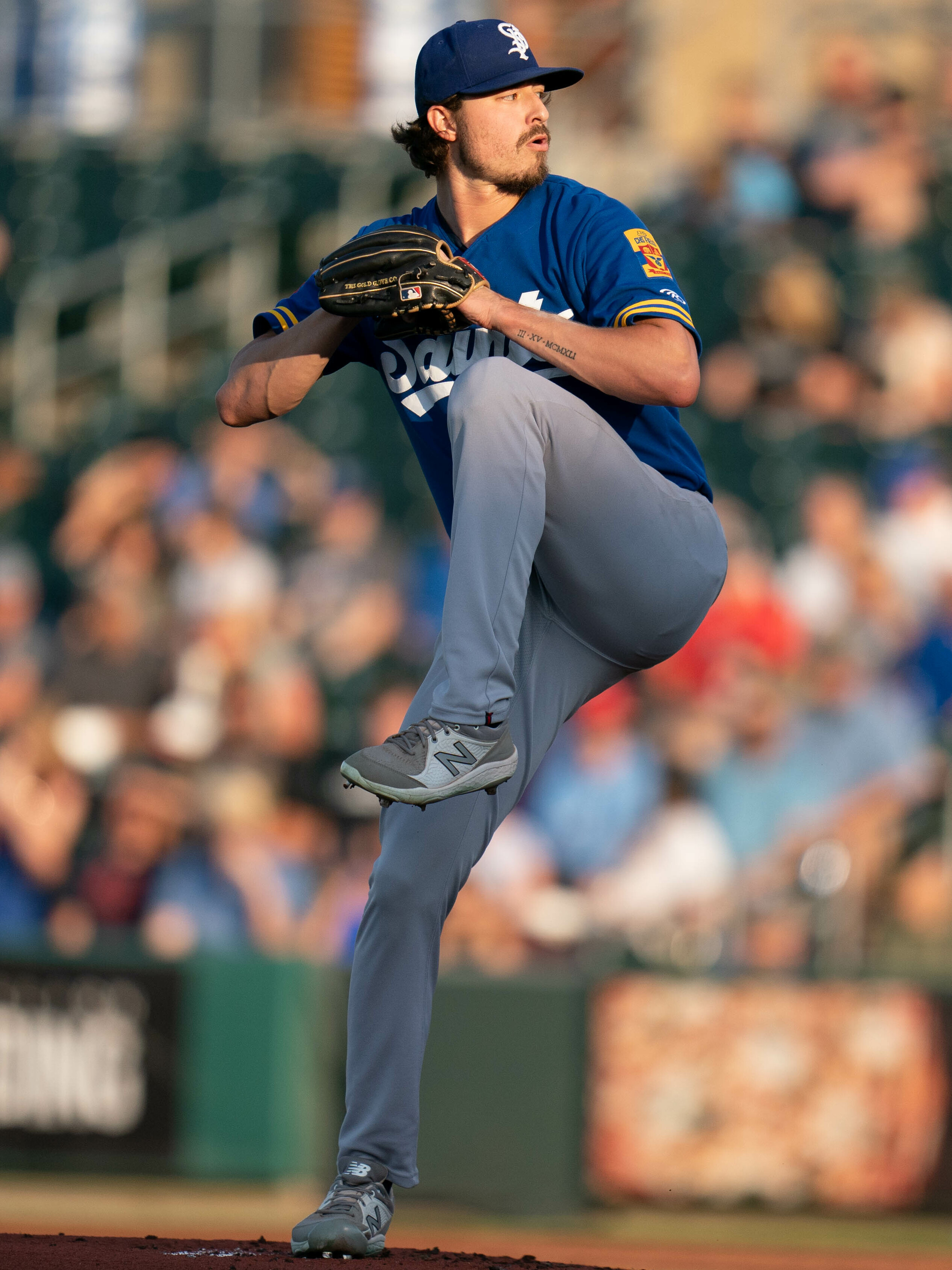
- Balazovic with the St. Paul Saints in 2022

Uni-President Lions – No. 87
- Pitcher
- Born: September 17, 1998 (age 28); Mississauga, Ontario, Canada
- Bats: Right Throws: Right

Professional debut
- MLB: June 18, 2023, for the Minnesota Twins
- KBO: July 14, 2024, for the Doosan Bears
- CPBL: April 3, 2026, for the Uni-President Lions

MLB statistics (through 2023 season)
- Win–loss record: 1–0
- Earned run average: 4.44
- Strikeouts: 17

KBO statistics (through 2024 season)
- Win–loss record: 2–6
- Earned run average: 4.26
- Strikeouts: 69

CPBL statistics (through July 6, 2026)
- Win–loss record: 3-1
- Earned run average: 1.10
- Strikeouts: 58
- Stats at Baseball Reference

Teams
- Minnesota Twins (2023); Doosan Bears (2024); Uni-President Lions (2026–present)
Medals
Men's baseball
Representing Canada
Pan American Games
Silver medal – second place	2019 Lima	Team

Jordan Blake Balazovic (born September 17, 1998) is a Canadian professional baseball pitcher for the Uni-President Lions of the Chinese Professional Baseball League (CPBL). He has previously played in Major League Baseball (MLB) for the Minnesota Twins, and in the KBO League for the Doosan Bears.

== Career ==
=== Minnesota Twins ===
Balazovic attended St. Martin Secondary School in Mississauga, Ontario. He was drafted by the Minnesota Twins in the fifth round of the 2016 Major League Baseball draft and he signed, forgoing his commitment to play college baseball at Auburn University.

Balazovic spent his first two professional seasons in 2016 and 2017 with the Gulf Coast Twins, posting a 1.97 ERA and a 4.91 ERA, respectively. He spent 2018 with the Cedar Rapids Kernels, going 7–3 with a 3.94 ERA in 12 games (11 starts), and returned there to begin 2019 before being promoted to the Fort Myers Miracle. In July, he represented the Twins in the 2019 All-Star Futures Game. Over 19 games (18 starts) with Cedar Rapids and Fort Myers, he pitched to an 8–5 record and a 2.69 ERA, striking out 129 over 93 2/3 innings. In July and August he played for team Canada in the 2019 Pan American Games.

Balazovic did not play in a game in 2020 due to the cancellation of the minor league season because of the COVID-19 pandemic. The Twins added Balazovic to their 40-man roster after the 2020 season.

Balazovic spent the 2021 season with the Double-A Wichita Wind Surge, recording a 5–4 record and 3.62 ERA with 102 strikeouts in 97.0 innings pitched across 20 starts. He pitched in 22 games (21 starts) for the Triple-A St. Paul Saints in 2022, but struggled to an 0–7 record and 7.39 ERA with 76 strikeouts in 70.2 innings pitched.

On February 11, 2023, Balazovic suffered a broken jaw after being struck twice by a stranger and had his jaw wired shut. On March 3, Balazovic was optioned to Triple-A St. Paul to begin the season. He made 14 appearances, mainly working out of the bullpen, and logged a 4.79 ERA with 50 strikeouts in 35 2/3 innings of work. On June 18, Balazovic was promoted to the major leagues for the first time after Jorge Lopez was placed on the injured list. In the major leagues, Balazovic recorded a 1–0 record and a 4.44 ERA with 17 strikeouts in 24.1 innings pitched over 18 games. He was designated for assignment on February 7, 2024. He cleared waivers and was sent outright to Triple-A on February 13.

=== Doosan Bears ===
On July 4, 2024, Balazovic signed with the Doosan Bears of the KBO League. He made 12 starts for the Bears, posting a 2–6 record with a 4.26 ERA and 69 strikeouts across 57 innings pitched. Balazovic became a free agent following the season.

=== Detroit Tigers ===
On December 22, 2024, Balazovic signed a minor league contract with the Detroit Tigers. He made 37 appearances for the High-A West Michigan Whitecaps and Triple-A Toledo Mud Hens in 2025, posting a cumulative 5-1 record and 3.75 ERA with 53 strikeouts and one save across 57 2/3 innings pitched. Balazovic elected free agency following the season on November 6, 2025.

=== Uni-President Lions ===
On January 9, 2026, Balazovic signed with the Uni-President Lions of the Chinese Professional Baseball League.
