= Cauchy Muamba =

Canadian football player (born 1987)

No. 3, 8
- Position: Defensive back

Personal information
- Born: May 8, 1987 (age 39); Kinshasa, Zaire
- Listed height: 5 ft 11 in (1.80 m)
- Listed weight: 198 lb (90 kg)

Career information
- High school: Father Michael Goetz
- University: St. Francis Xavier
- CFL draft: 2010: 5th round, 34th overall pick

Career history
- 2010–2012: BC Lions
- 2013: Winnipeg Blue Bombers
- 2014–2017: Edmonton Eskimos
- 2018: BC Lions*
- 2018: Saskatchewan Roughriders*
- 2019: Montreal Alouettes
- * Offseason or practice squad member only

Awards and highlights
- 2× Grey Cup champion (2011, 2015)
- Stats at CFL.ca

Cauchy Muamba (born May 8, 1987) is a Congolese-born former Canadian football player who played defensive back who played in the Canadian Football League (CFL). He was selected 34th overall by the BC Lions in the 2010 CFL draft, and signed a contract with the team on May 25, 2010. He played CIS football for the St. Francis Xavier X-Men.

He grew up in Mississauga with his younger brothers Hénoc and Kelvin.
