= St. Michael Catholic Secondary School (Bolton) =

St Michael Catholic Secondary School

Location
- 9130 Columbia Way; Bolton, Ontario, L7E 4G6; Canada; 43.89520°N 79.75165°W

Information
- School type: Separate High School
- Religious affiliation: Roman Catholic
- Founded: 2010
- School board: Dufferin-Peel Catholic District School Board
- Superintendent: Sue Steer, Jodi Kuran
- Area trustee: Paula Dametto-Giovannizo
- Principal: Josie Lorenzon
- Grades: 9 to 12
- Language: English
- Campus: Rural
- Colours: Navy Blue, and Yellow
- Team name: Thunder
- Website: www.dpcdsb.org/MICHS/

St. Michael Catholic Secondary School, is a Catholic high school located in Bolton, Ontario. The school is administered by the Dufferin-Peel Catholic District School Board.

Like other members of the district, students who attend St. Michael receive teaching on religion, family life and prayer in addition to the standard curriculum found in public schools.

== See also ==
- Education in Ontario
- List of secondary schools in Ontario
