= St. Aloysius Gonzaga Secondary School =

St. Aloysius Gonzaga Catholic Secondary School
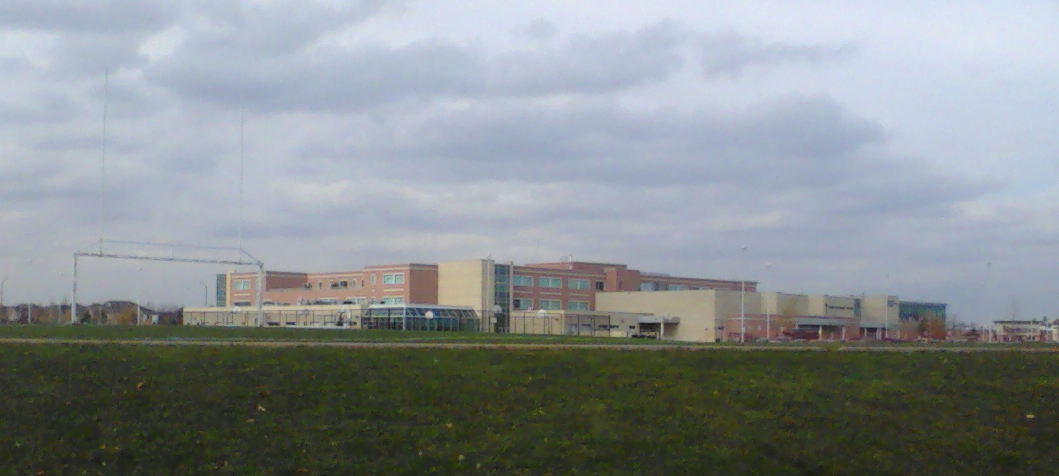
- Distant Photo Including Building and Field

Location
- 2800 Erin Centre Blvd; Mississauga, Ontario, L5M 6R5; Canada; 43.5565°N 79.7176°W

Information
- School type: Catholic High School
- Motto: "For The Greater Glory of God"
- Religious affiliation: Catholic
- Founded: 2000
- School board: Dufferin-Peel Catholic District School Board
- Superintendent: Martine Lewis
- Area trustee: Sharon Hobin (Ward 8); Brea Corbet(Ward 9); Luz Del Rasario (Ward 11)
- Principal: Laura Di Gennaro
- Grades: 9–12
- Enrolment: 1,899 (As of October 31, 2009)
- Language: English and Extended French
- Area: Mississauga – Erin Mills
- Colours: Gold, Orange, Navy
- Mascot: Gonzaga Bulldog
- Team name: Gonzaga Bulldogs
- Website: www.dpcdsb.org/GONZA

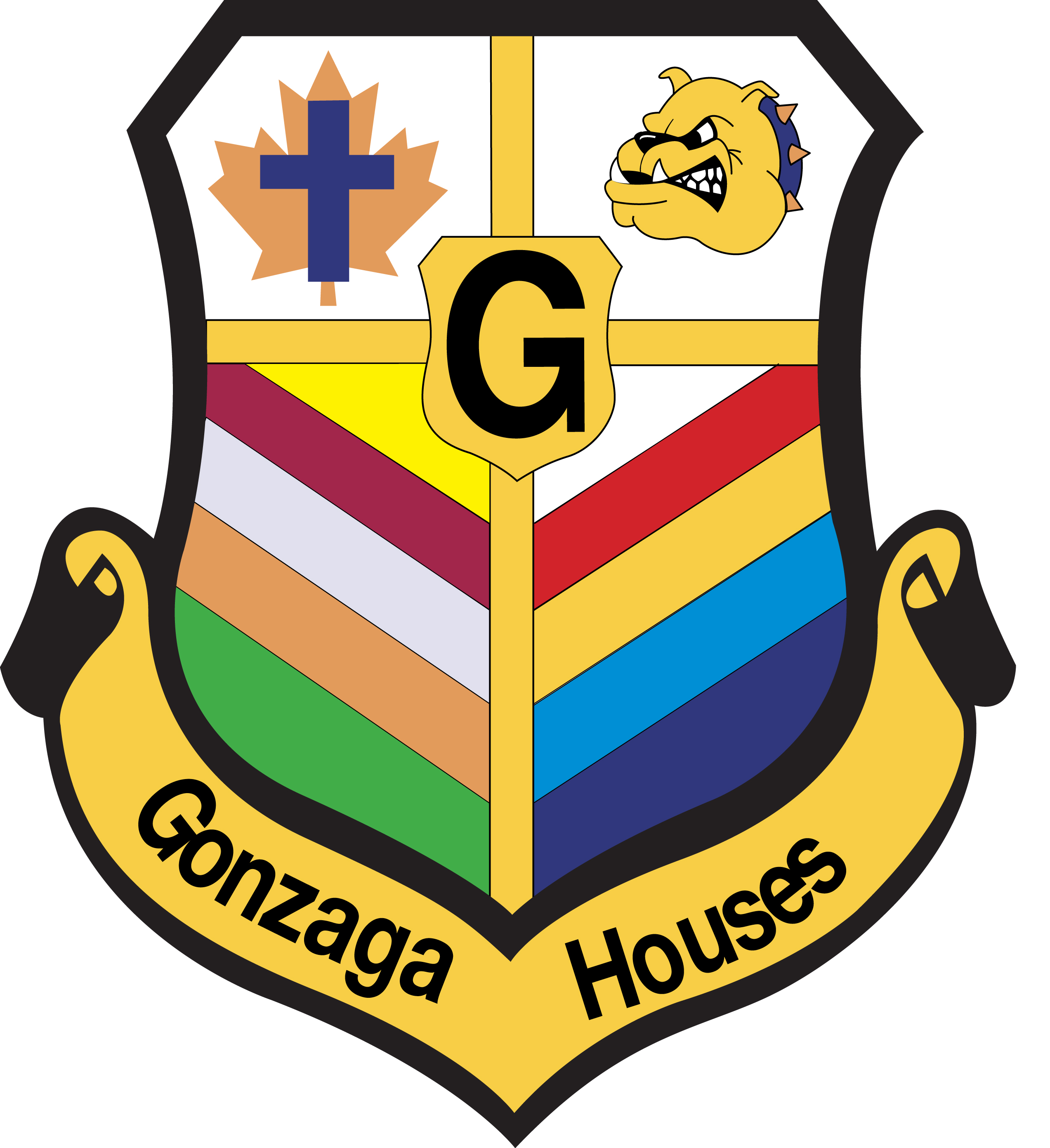
The Gonzaga House Colours Crest

St. Aloysius Gonzaga Secondary School, colloquially referred to as Zaga, is a Catholic high school located in the Erin Mills community of Mississauga, Ontario, named after Saint Aloysius Gonzaga. The school opened in Mississauga in 2001, after spending a year as a holding school in Georgetown. It is a joint venture between the city of Mississauga and the Dufferin-Peel Catholic District School Board. According to the Fraser Institute, it is currently ranked 2nd in the Dufferin-Peel Catholic District School Board behind, 6th in Mississauga, and 63rd out of 623 high schools in Ontario.

== History ==
St. Aloysius Gonzaga Secondary School was established in 2000 as a holding school in nearby Georgetown. The new school’s construction was completed and it was opened and blessed in 2001. It is located at 2800 Erin Centre Boulevard in Mississauga.

It is part of Erin Meadows Multi-use Complex, a partnership between the City of Mississauga, the Mississauga Library System, and the school board. The advanced-concept building includes a substantial library and a community centre complete with a swimming pool. Students are able to access the community library and can use the community centre facilities as part of their program.

Gonzaga, which has over 1,800 students, has a significant number of programs that accommodate academic and special needs students. Integrated in the programs are Advanced Placement classes, a Career Paths (vocational) program, a SOAR (Supportive Opportunities for Academics and Resources) program, and an Extended French program for selected students.

== Description ==
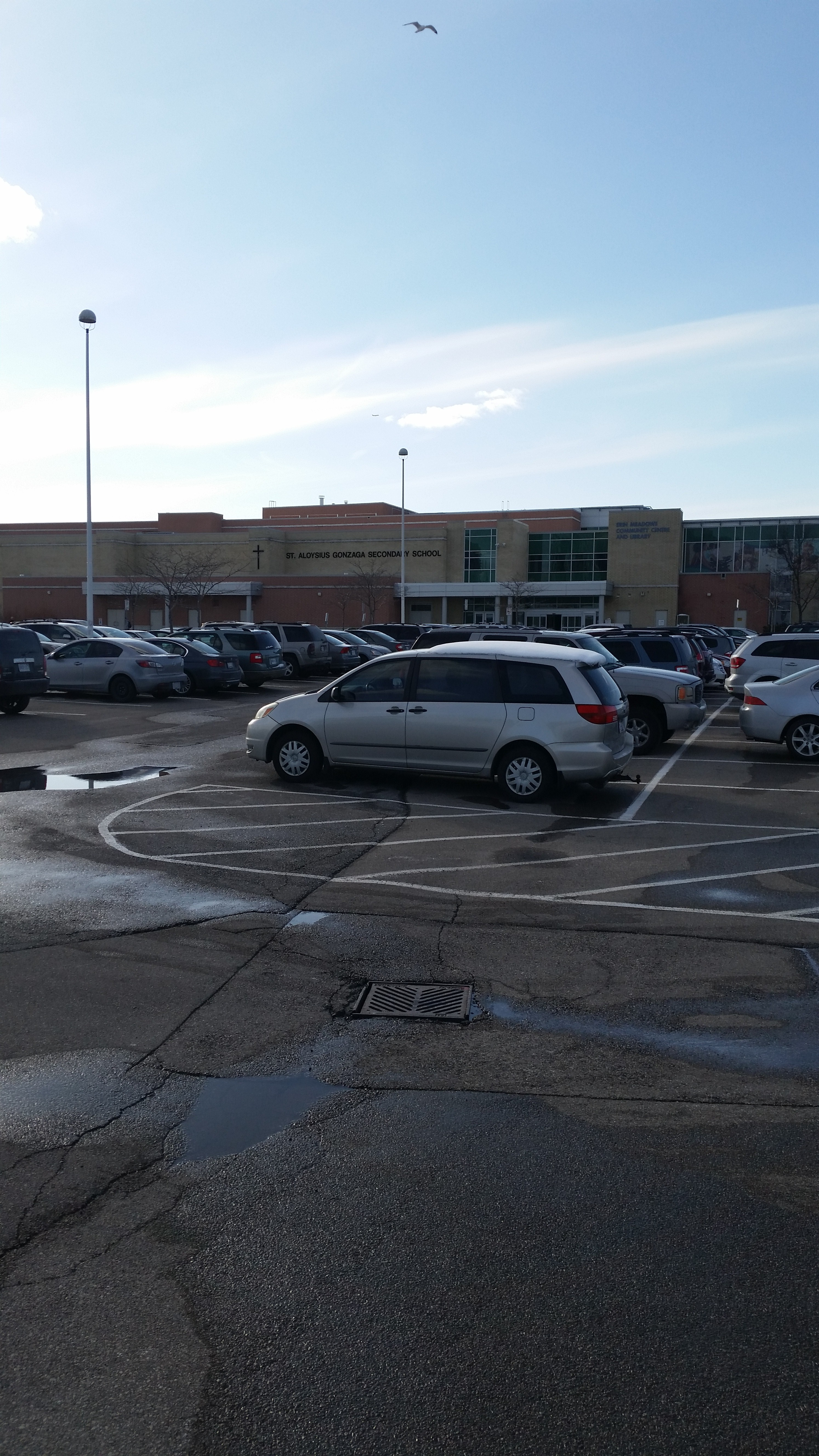
St. Aloysius Gonzaga Secondary School from parking lot

Gonzaga is part of Erin Meadows Multi-use Complex, a partnership between the City of Mississauga, the Mississauga Library System, and the school board. The advanced-concept building includes a substantial library and a community centre complete with swimming pool. Students are able to access the community library and can use the community centre facilities as part of their program.

Gonzaga, which has over 1,800 students, has a significant number of programs that accommodate academic and special needs students. Integrated in the programs are Advanced Placement classes, a Career Paths (vocational) program, a SOAR (Supportive Opportunities for Academics and Resources) program, and an Extended French program for selected students.

The school is across the street from Merciful Redeemer Parish, where students can attend mass. The geographic proximity of the school to our Merciful Redeemer Parish, has helped to create close ties between the school and parish communities. Some school retreats are held at the parish, and students are involved in parish ministries and the parish's Life Teen program

St. Aloysius Gonzaga Secondary School currently has a TV studio and editing room, auto centre, construction department, greenhouse, music room, dance studio, drama stage and theatre, and a weight lifting room! The atrium, community meeting rooms, library, and swimming pool are shared with the City of Mississauga.

== Feeder Schools ==
The elementary schools that St. Aloysius Gonzaga derives the majority of its new students are from:

- Divine Mercy
- Our Lady of Mercy
- St. Elizabeth Seton
- St. Joseph
- St. Rose of Lima (Extended French students)
- St. Therese of the Child Jesus (Extended French students)
- San Lorenzo Ruiz (Extended French students)
- St. Bernard of Clairvaux

== House system ==
St. Aloysius Gonzaga has a house system implemented of which students score house points for participating in academic and extra-curricular achievements at the school, and help around the local community. All students are randomly sorted into one of the 10 Gonzaga Houses for his/her high school career once entering Grade 9. These houses include Strength (Yellow), Courage (White), Faith (Burgundy), Challenge (Red), Truth (Silver), Justice (Gold), Peace (Orange), Dreams (Sky Blue), Perseverance (Green), and Leadership (Royal Blue).

- 2005 Champions – Leadership House
- 2006 Champions – Perseverance House
- 2007 Champions – Truth House
- 2008 Champions – Strength House
- 2009 Champions – Faith House
- 2010 Champions – Strength House
- 2011 Champions – Faith House
- 2012 Champions – Strength House
- 2013 Champions – Dreams House
- 2016 Champions – Courage House
- 2017 Champions – Courage House

== Athletics ==
The 23 sports teams offered by St. Aloysius Gonzaga range from varsity teams, to group teams and intramurals. The varsity girls hockey team winning OFSAA in 2013. The school offers: senior and junior boys hockey, varsity girls hockey, senior and junior boys volleyball, senior and junior girls volleyball, senior and junior boys basketball, senior and junior girls basketball, intramural basketball, senior and junior boys soccer, intramural soccer, senior and junior boys football, girls flag football, baseball varsity boys, softball varsity girls, cricket, curling, dance, golf, tennis, lacrosse, cross country, and track and field.

== Clubs and organizations ==
St. Aloysius Gonzaga offers many clubs and organizations to all students. With 40 total clubs and organizations, ranging in wide variety from one club to the next, there are many for students to choose from.

== Notable alumni ==
- Oshae Brissett (born 1998), Israeli Basketball Premier League, and formerly NBA, basketball player
- David Broll (born 1993), former NHL ice hockey player
- Robby Fabbri (born 1996), NHL ice hockey player

== See also ==
- Education in Ontario
- List of secondary schools in Ontario
