= Adrian Clarke (Canadian football) =

Canadian football player (born 1991)

Profile
- Position: Linebacker

Personal information
- Born: September 7, 1991 (age 35); Mississauga, Ontario, Canada
- Listed height: 6 ft 3 in (1.91 m)
- Listed weight: 235 lb (107 kg)

Career information
- High school: Father Michael Goetz
- University: Bishop's
- CFL draft: 2015: 4th round, 32nd overall pick

Career history
- 2015–2017: BC Lions
- 2018: Saskatchewan Roughriders*
- 2020–2021: BC Lions
- * Offseason or practice squad member only
- Stats at CFL.ca

Adrian Clarke (born July 9, 1991) is a Canadian former professional football linebacker. He attended Bishop's University.

== Early career ==
Clarke played high school football at Father Michael Goetz Secondary School, where he also played basketball and track and field. He played college football for the Bishop's Gaiters from 2011 to 2014 at the linebacker and safety positions, recording 101 solo tackles and seven sacks over 34 games. He was invited to the 2013 East-West Bowl game.

== Professional career ==
Clarke recorded the fastest 40-yard dash time at the CFL Combine among the linebackers who participated. He was drafted in the fourth round of the 2015 CFL draft by the BC Lions with the 32nd overall pick. After making the active roster to start the 2015 season, Clarke made his CFL debut in the Lions' first game of the season against the Ottawa Redblacks, where he completed two special teams tackles. He spent the 2018 season with the Saskatchewan Roughriders and did not play professionally in 2019.

On January 31, 2020, Clarke re-signed with the BC Lions. He signed a contract extension with the team on December 15, 2020. He was released on March 19, 2021.
