= St. Joseph Secondary School (Mississauga) =

St. Joseph Catholic Secondary School

Location
- 5555 Creditview Road; Mississauga, Ontario, L5V 2B9; Canada; 43.59°N 79.70°W

Information
- School type: Separate High School
- Motto: "Carpe Diem" ("Seize the Day")
- Religious affiliation: Roman Catholic
- Founded: 1993; 33 years ago
- School board: Dufferin-Peel Catholic District School Board
- Superintendent: Silvana Gos
- Area trustee: Luz Del Rosario
- Principal: Rosina Ariganello
- Grades: 9 to 12
- Enrolment: 1300 (As of October 31, 2013)
- Language: English, programs include French, Spanish
- Campus: Suburban
- Area: Mississauga-Streetsville
- Colour
- Mascot: Jaguar Joe (Jaggy Joe)
- Team name: Jaguars
- Website: www.dpcdsb.org/JOESS/

St. Joseph Secondary School, colloquially known as St. Joe's, is a Catholic high school located in the East Credit community of Mississauga, Ontario. The school is administered by the Dufferin-Peel Catholic District School Board. It is one of few schools in Ontario to offer Pre-Advanced Placement courses starting in grade 9; most schools offer the option of Advanced Placement (AP) level classes in grade 12. Students who graduate in any course with an AP level exam completed will earn university-level credits in the course. The school is also a provider of the Business and Transportation Specialist High Skills Majors (SHSM), granting students who complete the major with an Ontario Secondary School Diploma including a recognized seal for employment opportunities after graduation.

Like other members of the district, students who attend the school receive teaching on religion, family life, and prayer, in addition to the standard curriculum found in public schools. The school is linked with the St. Joseph's Parish in Streetsville, which is a part of the Roman Catholic Archdiocese of Toronto. Its scriptural motto is "Be Not Afraid... Come Follow Me".

Some extra-curricular programs include Model United Nation (MUN), Future Business Leaders Association (FBLA), The Mirror (school newspaper), Culture Shock, Green Team, L.I.F.E. Ministry, SafeSpace, Yearbook Committee, Annual Christmas talent Show, Artsapalooza, Artsfest, School Musical, Peer Tutoring, Jazz and Marching Band and the Nicaragua Project. Also, the school LINK Crew Ambassadors are a successful widespread organization, and assist with tours and parent evenings. The school is built almost exactly like Philip Pocock Catholic Secondary School also in Mississauga. The school was attended by Trooper Marc Diab, who was killed by a roadside bomb while serving his country in the War in Afghanistan. The park behind the school was renamed Trooper Marc Diab Memorial Park, in his honour.

In June 2013, the school was awarded the 2012–13 Premier's Award for Accepting Schools on behalf of Ontario Premier Kathleen Wynne. The Premier's Awards for Accepting Schools are awarded annually and recognize schools that have demonstrated initiative, creativity, and leadership in promoting a safe, inclusive, and accepting school climate. Bob Delaney, MPP (Mississauga-Streetsville) made a presentation in the school library on Monday, June 17, 2013.

== Feeder schools ==
- Our Lady of Good Voyage
- St. Bernadette
- St. David of Wales
- St. Raymond
- St. Herbert
- St. Valentine (residents west of Mavis Road)

== Athletics ==
The St. Joseph Jaguars have many sports teams, which are known locally as some of the most competitive in the school board, such as the following:

- Swimming (junior and senior)
- Hockey (senior and junior boys and varsity girls)
- Cross-country Running (senior, junior, and novice)
- Golf (varsity)
- Field Hockey (varsity girls)
- Basketball (senior and junior)
- Volleyball (senior, junior and boys bantam)
- Cricket (varsity)
- Soccer (senior and junior)
- Track & Field (senior, junior, and novice)
- Baseball (boys varsity)
- Fast Pitch Softball (girls varsity)
- Tennis (senior and junior)
- Curling (varsity mixed)
- Badminton (senior and junior)
- Table Tennis (senior and junior)
- Flag Football (girls)

== Championships ==
- Bantam Boys Volleyball 2005 Champions
- Junior Boys Soccer Tier 1 2007 Champions
- Senior Rugby Boys Tier 2 2013 Champions
- Bantam Boys Basketball 2010 Champions
- Senior Boys Basketball 2016 Champions
- Novice Boys Cross Country 2023 Champions

== Incidents ==
=== Stabbings ===
St. Joseph Secondary School stabbings
- Location: Mississauga, Ontario, Canada
- Date: June 17, 2009
- Target: Student
- Attack type: Mass stabbing
- Weapon: Knives
- Injuries: 5
- Perpetrator: Two stabbers

On June 17, 2009, at least two students and one teacher were stabbed after they attempted to stop a fight between several students on school property. Two students suffered severe stab wounds and were rushed to Credit Valley Hospital. Peel Regional Police said they received the initial call at around 8:30 a.m. After reports of multiple stabbings, the school was placed in lock down between 8:30 a.m. and 10:00 a.m. Shortly after the lock down was lifted, the school was evacuated and remained closed for the rest of the day while police continued their investigation into the stabbings. Later in the day, Peel Regional Police announced that two suspects aged 16 and 17 were arrested and charged with attempted murder.

== Notable alumni ==
- Owen Power, first pick of the 2021 NHL draft on the Buffalo Sabres
- Tiffany Cameron, professional soccer player who played on the Canada women's national soccer team
- Andre Durie, professional Canadian football player
- Chris Leroux, professional baseball player
- Rechie Valdez, Member of Parliament for Mississauga-Streetsville (2021–Present), currently serving in the Cabinet of Canada as Chief Government Whip (2025–Present), former Minister for Small Business (2023-2025), and first Filipina-Canadian to be elected to the Canadian House of Commons.

== See also ==
- Education in Ontario
- List of secondary schools in Ontario
