= St. Augustine Catholic Secondary School =

Location
- 27 Drinkwater Road; Peel Region; Brampton, Ontario, L6Y 4T6; Canada; USA 43.65827°N 79.76503°W

Information
- Motto: Ever Ancient, Ever New.
- Religious affiliation: Roman Catholic
- School board: Dufferin-Peel Catholic District School Board
- Principal: Sophia Maloney
- Grades: 9-12
- Colours: Red, White and Blue
- Mascot: Falcons
- Team name: St. Augustine Falcons
- Website: http://www3.dpcdsb.org/AUGST

St. Augustine Catholic Secondary School is a Catholic high school in Brampton, Ontario. This high school is part of the Dufferin-Peel Catholic District School Board. Enrolment is 985 students (as of March 31, 2019).

== Uniform ==
St. Augustine has a strict policy on students wearing their proper uniform. The uniform consists of a navy blue rugby material dress shirt or gold shirt and grey dress pants. The students have two options for their top as there is a long sleeve and a short sleeve option. Uniform is provided by the school board's partnership with R.J. McCarthy.

== Engagement with the community ==
Along with the Ash Wednesday and Easter Mass that takes place within the school's cafeteria and auditorium, students are to embrace their faith outside of the school's wall. Every grade level are mandatory to take religion once every academic school year. Though students can substitute their religion class for a philosophy class in grade 12. Each year, the religion classes are to partake on a retreat to local organization to further their learning of the Catholic faith and to gain a sense of global community.

== See also ==
- Education in Ontario
- List of secondary schools in Ontario
