= Chris Greaves (Canadian football) =

Canadian gridiron footballer (born 1987)

No. 65
- Position: Offensive lineman

Personal information
- Born: January 8, 1987 (age 39); Toronto, Ontario, Canada
- Listed height: 6 ft 5 in (1.96 m)
- Listed weight: 305 lb (138 kg)

Career information
- High school: St. Francis Xavier
- University: Western Ontario
- CFL draft: 2010: 6th round, 45th overall pick

Career history
- 2010–2015: Winnipeg Blue Bombers
- 2015–2017: Edmonton Eskimos
- 2017: Montreal Alouettes
- 2018: BC Lions

Awards and highlights
- Grey Cup champion (2015)
- Stats at CFL.ca

Christopher Greaves (born January 8, 1987) is a Canadian former professional football offensive lineman who played in the Canadian Football League (CFL). He was selected 45th overall by the Winnipeg Blue Bombers as a defensive lineman in the 2010 CFL draft, but made the switch to offence in training camp. He played CIS football for the Western Mustangs and high school football for St. Francis Xavier Secondary School.

On September 9, 2015, Greaves was traded to the Edmonton Eskimos for Selvish Capers and a second round pick in the 2016 CFL draft.
