= Dufferin-Peel Catholic District School Board =

School board in Ontario, Canada

Location
- 40 Matheson Boulevard West, Mississauga, ON L5R 1C5 Mississauga, Brampton, Caledon, Dufferin County Canada
- Coordinates: 43.6195°N 79.6716°W (HQ building)

District information
- Established: 1969 January 1, 1998 (present form)
- Chief executive officer: Marianne Mazzorato
- Chair of the board: Luz Del Rosario
- Schools: 151 total (125 elementary and 26 secondary)
- Budget: $CAD 777 million

Students and staff
- Students: approx 73,000
- Staff: 11,000

Other information
- Elected Trustees: 11
- Schedule: Semester
- Website: dpcdsb.org

The Dufferin-Peel Catholic District School Board (DPCDSB, known as English-language Separate District School Board No. 43 prior to 1999) is the separate school board that oversees 153 Catholic school facilities (125 elementary schools, 26 secondary or high schools and 2 continuing education schools or adult learning centers) throughout Peel Region (Mississauga, Brampton, Caledon) and Dufferin County (including Orangeville). It employs roughly 5,000 teachers; about 3,000 at the elementary level, and the remaining 2,000 at the secondary school and continuing education level.

Its headquarters is on Matheson Boulevard West in Mississauga. The board was previously known as the Dufferin-Peel Separate School Board (DPSSB) before 1998.

== History ==
The Dufferin-Peel Catholic District School Board is the successor to the Dufferin-Peel Separate School Board (French: Conseil des écoles séparées catholiques de Dufferin & Peel), which was established in 1969 by the merger of eight small separate boards.

As of 1986 the Dufferin-Peel Separate School Board was Ontario's second largest Catholic school board. On January 1, 1998, the DPSSB was renamed to DPCDSB and its French schools within the board became part of the Conseil scolaire de district catholique Centre-Sud.

By 1999 the district had a co-operative transportation service with the Peel District School Board. During that year its school operation costs were $4.65 ($8.22 when adjusted for inflation) per square foot. The funding guidelines by a ministry were $5.20 ($9.19 when adjusted for inflation).

Around the time of the DPSSB's existence, the board operated six francophone schools.

=== Financial difficulties and government supervision ===
The school board has experienced a significant drop in enrollment and recurring in-year deficits since 2018. It has had a growing overall deficit since 2021. In 2021 the Ontario Ministry of Education requested that the school board provide a multi-year financial recovery plan; however, the resultant plan did not meet the ministry's goals, and Deloitte LLP was appointed by the ministry to investigate the board's financial affairs. Deloitte's 2023 report showed a probable financial default and recommended that the ministry take over administration of the school board. The school board complied with the ministry's specific financial directives; however, its financial position continued to deteriorate and a second financial investigation, in June, 2025, showed an increasing accumulated deficit and a significant risk of financial default, and recommended ministry control of the board.

Rick Byers, a former Member of Provincial Parliament with a background in finance and auditing, was appointed supervisor of the Dufferin-Peel Catholic District School Board on 27 June 2025. All trustee decisions, other than denominational matters, will be made by Byers.

== School bus transportation ==
In addition to local transit systems Brampton Transit and MiWay (Mississauga Transit) there are a number of transportation providers under contract for the DPCDSB:

- Attridge Transportation
- Cook Bus Lines
- Denny Bus Lines
- First Student Canada
- Parkview Transit
- Switzer-Carty Transportation

== Schools ==
As of 1999, there is one dual DPCDSB-Peel District School Board Catholic-secular public school.

=== Continuing Education ===
- Blessed Trinity Catholic Centre For Learning
- St. Dunstan Catholic Language Learning Center
- St. Gabriel Adult Education Center
- St. Kateri Tekakwitha Catholic Learning Centre

=== Secondary schools ===
- Ascension of Our Lord Secondary School, Mississauga
- Cardinal Ambrozic Secondary School, Brampton
- Cardinal Leger Secondary School, Brampton
- Father Michael Goetz Secondary School, Mississauga
- Holy Name of Mary Secondary School (all girls school), Brampton.
- Iona Catholic Secondary School, Mississauga
- John Cabot Catholic Secondary School, Mississauga
- Loyola Catholic Secondary School, Mississauga
- Notre Dame Catholic Secondary School, Brampton
- Our Lady of Mount Carmel Secondary School, Mississauga
- Philip Pocock Catholic Secondary School, Mississauga
- Robert F. Hall Catholic Secondary School, Caledon
- St. Aloysius Gonzaga Secondary School, Mississauga
- St. Augustine Catholic Secondary School, Brampton
- St. Edmund Campion Secondary School, Brampton
- St. Francis Xavier Secondary School, Mississauga
- St. Joan of Arc Catholic Secondary School, Mississauga
- St. Joseph's Secondary School, Mississauga
- St. Marcellinus Secondary School, Mississauga
- St. Marguerite d'Youville Secondary School, Brampton
- St. Martin Catholic Secondary School, Mississauga
- St. Michael Catholic Secondary School, Caledon
- St. Oscar Romero Catholic Secondary School (alternative high school), Mississauga
- St. Paul Secondary School, Mississauga
- St. Roch Catholic Secondary School, Brampton
- St. Thomas Aquinas Secondary School, Brampton

=== Elementary schools ===
- All Saints Separate School
- Bishop Francis Allen School
- Blessed Micheal J. McGivney Catholic School
- Canadian Martyrs Catholic School
- Christ the King Separate School
- Corpus Christi Separate School
- Divine Mercy Elementary School
- Father C.W. Sullivan Catholic School
- Father Clair Tipping Catholic Elementary School
- Father Daniel Zanon Catholic School
- Father Francis McSpiritt Catholic Elementary School
- Georges Vanier Catholic School
- Good Shepherd Catholic Elementary School
- Guardian Angels Catholic Elementary School
- Holy Cross Separate School
- Holy Family Catholic Elementary School
- Holy Spirit Catholic Elementary School
- Lester B. Pearson Catholic School
- Mary Fix Catholic School
- Metropolitan Andrei Separate School
- Our Lady of Fatima Catholic School
- Our Lady of Good Voyage School
- Our Lady of Lourdes Catholic Elementary School
- Our Lady of Mercy Elementary School
- Our Lady of Peace Separate School
- Our Lady of Providence School
- Pauline Vanier Catholic Elementary School
- Queen of Heaven Elementary School
- Sacred Heart Elementary School
- San Lorenzo Ruiz Elementary School
- St. Agnes Elementary School
- St. Aidan Elementary School
- St. Albert of Jerusalem Elementary School
- St. Alfred Separate School
- St. Alphonsa Catholic Elementary School
- St. Andrew Elementary School
- St. Angela Merici Catholic Elementary School
- St. Andre Bessette Catholic Elementary school
- St. Anne Elementary School
- St. Anthony Elementary School
- St. Barbara Elementary School
- St. Basil Elementary School
- St. Benedict Elementary School
- St. Bernadette Elementary School
- St. Bernard of Clairvaux Catholic Elementary School
- St. Bonaventure Catholic Elementary School
- St. Brigid Elementary School
- St. Carlo Acutis Catholic Elementary School
- St. Catherine of Siena Separate School
- St. Cecilia Catholic Elementary School
- St. Charles Garnier School
- St. Christopher Separate School
- St. Clare Separate School
- St. Cornelius Elementary School
- St. Daniel Comboni Catholic Elementary School
- St. David of Wales Separate School
- St. Dominic Separate School
- St. Edith Stein Elementary School
- St. Edmund Separate School
- St. Elizabeth Seton School
- St. Evan Catholic Elementary School
- St. Faustina Elementary School
- St. Francis Xavier Elementary School
- St. Francis of Assisi Catholic School
- St. Gerard Separate School
- St. Giovanni Scalabrini Catholic Elementary School
- St. Gregory Elementary School
- St. Helen Separate School
- St. Herbert Elementary School
- St. Hilary Elementary School
- St. Isaac Jogues Elementary School
- St. Jacinta Marto Catholic Elementary School
- St. James Catholic Global Learning Centre (International Baccalaureate Elementary Program)
- St. Jean Brebeuf Elementary School
- St. Jean-Marie Vianney Catholic Elementary School
- St. Jerome Separate School
- St. Joachim Elementary School
- St. John Bosco School
- St. John Fisher Elementary School
- St. John Henry Newman Catholic Elementary School
- St. John Paul II Catholic Elementary School
- St. John of the Cross Catholic School
- St. John the Baptist Elementary School
- St. John XXIII Catholic Elementary School
- St. Joseph School (Mississauga)
- St. Joseph School (Brampton)
- St. Josephine Bakhita Catholic Elementary School
- St. Jude Separate School
- St. Julia Catholic Elementary School
- St. Kevin Separate School
- St. Leonard Elementary School
- St. Louis Separate School
- St. Lucy Catholic Elementary School
- St. Luke Elementary School
- St. Margaret of Scotland School
- St. Marguerite Bourgeoys Separate School
- St. Maria Goretti School
- St. Mark Separate School
- St. Mary Elementary School
- St. Matthew Catholic School
- St. Monica Elementary School
- St. Nicholas Elementary School
- St. Patrick Separate School
- St. Peter Elementary School
- St. Philip Elementary School
- St. Pio of Pietrelcina Elementary School
- St. Raphael Elementary School
- St. Raymond Elementary School
- St. Richard Catholic Elementary School
- St. Rita Elementary School
- St. Rose of Lima Separate School
- St. Sebastian Catholic Elementary School
- St. Simon Stock Elementary School
- St. Sofia Catholic School (Ukrainian Catholic)
- St. Stephen Elementary School
- St. Teresa of Avila Separate School
- St. Teresa of Calcutta School
- St. Timothy Elementary School
- St. Therese of the Child Jesus School
- St. Thomas More Separate School
- St. Ursula Elementary School
- St. Valentine Elementary School
- St. Veronica Elementary School
- St. Vincent de Paul Separate School
- Sts. Martha and Mary Catholic School
- Sts. Peter & Paul Separate School

=== Defunct Schools ===
- Blessed Trinity Elementary (repurposed for continuing education)
- Our Lady of the Airways Elementary (sold to the City of Mississauga)
- Mother Mary Ward Elementary (sold on open market to independent school)
- St. Dunstan Elementary (repurposed for continuing education)
- St. Gabriel Elementary (repurposed for continuing education)
- St. Gertrude Elementary (sold to Peel District School Board per Ontario Regulation 374/23)
- St. James Elementary (repurposed as a regional International Baccalaureate elementary school)
- St. Mary's Elementary (Port Credit) (leased to a child care operator)
- St. Michael Elementary (sold to the City of Mississauga)

== Controversies ==
=== Enrolment of non-Catholics ===
As with other school boards, Catholic high schools are funded by the provincial government, making them open to any students who wish to attend, while elementary schools do not have to enrol non-Catholic students. Critics argue that the practice of fully funding separate schools exclusively for the Roman Catholic faith is discriminatory to other religions (the United Nations has twice criticized the province for this policy). Supporters of the current Catholic education system point out that it has existed, in one form or another, since Confederation, and that the Constitution Act, 1867 enshrines the right to government-funded religious education to all Catholics. The opposition argues that this is an appeal to tradition, and point to other provinces in Canada which amended the constitution to abolish Catholic school funding. It is up to the school principal whether or not non-Catholics are enrolled.

=== “Black Boys” book ===
The board encountered controversy in 2019 when a book, titled The Guide for White Women Who Teach Black Boys, was shown on the principal's desk. This sparked various online debates on the internet. The book, written by American researchers and published in 2017, provides help and advice for teachers to create learning environments in which black students feel nurtured and engaged.

== See also ==
- Peel District School Board
- Upper Grand District School Board
- List of school districts in Ontario
- List of high schools in Ontario
- Archdiocese of Toronto
