= Father Michael Goetz Secondary School =

Location
- 330 Central Parkway West. Mississauga, Ontario, L5B 3K6; Canada; 43.582°N 79.636°W

Information
- School type: Separate High School
- Motto: Take a risk, Get involved, Be Committed!
- Religious affiliation: Roman Catholic
- Established: 1990
- School board: Dufferin-Peel Catholic District School Board
- Superintendent: Martine Lewis
- Area trustee: Stefano Pascucci, Luz del Rosario, Bruno Iannicca
- Principal: Sharon Allegretto
- Grades: 9 to 12
- Enrolment: 1375 (As of September 2020)
- Language: English, programs include French
- Campus: Suburban
- Area: Fairview
Colour
- Mascot: Alvin the Alligator
- Team name: Gators
- Website: www.dpcdsb.org/GOETZ/

Father Michael Goetz Secondary School (sometimes referred to as Goetz or abbreviated as FMG; Goetz pronounced as "Gates") is a Catholic school located in Mississauga, Ontario, Canada. Founded by Ed King, it was established in 1987 (in its original location on Hollymount Drive) and in 1990 moved to the south of the city centre. The school was named after King's friend, Father Michael Goetz. Father Michael Goetz is the closest high school to the city centre. Father Michael Goetz is known for its exceptional sports teams, as well as the city's best technological education programs, including computer science, computer engineering, construction technology and automotive technology. Father Michael Goetz offers two SHSM (Specialist High Skills Major) programs, one for Information and Communications Technology (ICT) and the other for Arts and Culture.

== Students ==
The school has one of the highest populations of English-as-a-second-language students in the school district.

== Academics ==
Students go through four years of schooling and the school offers a range of subjects at different levels of difficulty.

The curriculum includes 13 areas of study for the 2020-2021 year in the arts, business, languages, science, mathematics, and technology.

== 2007 Censorship row ==
In January 2007 a row broke out when the award-winning novel Snow Falling on Cedars by David Guterson was pulled from library shelves and classrooms, despite being used in the Grade 11 curriculum, after one parent objected that it contained sexually explicit text. The context in question contains a few explicit passages, including a married couple's first sexual encounter, as well as sexual relations between two youths. According to the Mississauga News, "a representative of Random House in Canada said the company hadn't heard any complaints about the book this side of the border. In the U.S., though, it has been the subject of controversy and bans, not just for the sexual content but also for its violence and exploration of racial issues." The book was restored in February following a review by a committee of trustees and curriculum experts. Many critics of the board's move argued that the content pales compared to media images to which high school students are exposed on a daily basis.

== Athletics ==
The school is a member of the Region of Peel Secondary School Athletic Association.

The girls basketball team was recognized as "high school team of the year" in 2007, after going undefeated over the previous four seasons with a 46–0 record.

== History ==
The school was founded by Ed King, who was also the first principal.

As the school was being planned and built, the first year of classes (1986) took place on a campus at Etobicoke before being moved at Christmas of the same year to a new temporary campus (1986-1990) located on Hollymount Dr in Mississauga.

Due to the large population, the school also took over a second shared campus on Rathburn Dr also in Mississauga. They were to stay there until the school building's construction was completed. It was open for the 1990–91 school year.

Due to a school population of over 2600 students from 1990–91 until the 2007–2008 school year, a new school was created and the population was split using a new boundary. All students going into grades 11, 12 and 13 were allowed to finish their high school years at Father Michael Goetz, while student in grades 9 and 10 in the new boundary were moved to the new school (St. Francis Xavier Secondary School).

In 2002, the school began an expansion that resulted in a new wing being added.

== Incidents ==
- April 25, 2016: At around 9:30 am the school engaged in a lockdown after a student was sighted with a firearm on school grounds. Peel Regional Police responded to the incident which resulted in an arrest.
- May 29, 2015: Female students were sent home and told that they were not permitted to wear any types of shorts, this suspension was applied only to female students and no male student was suspended. The school maintained that it was to protect the students from comments made by boys and to ensure their safety, the principal was quoted saying that a student was "asking for it" by wearing shorts. The school also added that the suspension had nothing to do with the Crop Top Day protest in Etobicoke.

== Notable alumni ==
- Cauchy Muamba, CFL player for the British Columbia Lions.
- Hénoc Muamba, CFL player for the Toronto Argonauts.
- Jonathan Hood, former CFL player.
- Greg Wojt, former CFL player.
- Andrew Nicholson, former NBA player.
- Adrian Clarke, CFL player for the British Columbia Lions
- Mona Awad, author
- Alvin Tedjo, Mayor of Mississauga

== See also ==
- Education in Ontario
- List of secondary schools in Ontario
