= St. Oscar Romero Catholic Secondary School (Mississauga) =

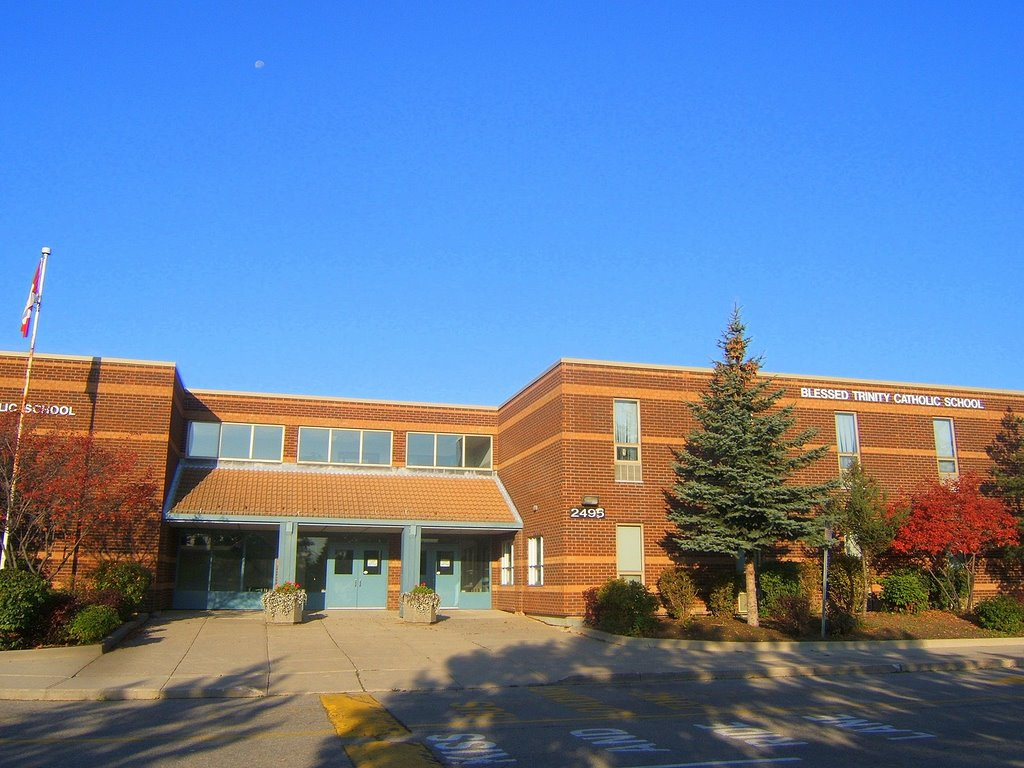
- Mississauga campus

Location
- Blessed Trinity Catholic Education Centre 2495 Credit Valley Road; Mississauga, Ontario, L5M 4G8; Canada; 43°33′04″N 79°42′32″W

Information
- School type: Public, Separate high school, alternative program
- Motto: Dream. Choose. Act. Succeed.
- Religious affiliation: Catholic
- Founded: February 2005
- School board: Dufferin-Peel Catholic District School Board
- Superintendent: Lucy Papaloni
- School number: 736228
- Principal: Annibale Iarossi
- Grades: 9 to 12
- Enrollment: 146 (September 2009)
- Language: English
- Campus: Suburban
- Area: Regional (Sites in: Mississauga, Brampton, Caledon, Dufferin County)
- Colours: Blue and white
- Website: www.dpcdsb.org/ROMER/

St. Oscar Romero Catholic Secondary School, formerly Archbishop Romero Catholic Secondary School, is an alternative-style Separate high school located in Mississauga, Ontario, Canada, with satellite campuses in Brampton and Caledon. The school is administered by the Dufferin-Peel Catholic District School Board.

Like other members of the district, students who attend St. Oscar Romero receive teaching on religion, family life, and prayer in addition to the standard curriculum found in public schools. The school originally opened as Archbishop Romero C.S.S. in February 2005. The school offers programs that include Dual Credit College Transition, Ontario Youth Apprenticeship Program Career Opportunities in Trades and Technology, or Machining / Electrical Pre-Trades at Sheridan College, ABLE Outdoor Adventure, Catholic Leadership, Co-op Experiential Learning, Flexible Alternative Learning, PLAR, New Directions and Positive Personal Change Programs. A newly formed community Roundtable allows participating stakeholders an opportunity to work together to align resources and services directly into program and school curriculum reflecting global learning for renewed hope. The school has no sports teams.

== See also ==
- Education in Ontario
- List of secondary schools in Ontario
