= List of people from Caledon, Ontario =

This list of people from Caledon includes people born, raised, or residing later in life in Caledon, Ontario, as well as people whose business in the area is of note. The page includes not only residents of the Town of Caledon, established in 1974, but also northern Chinguacousy, Albion Township, Caledon Township, the village of Bolton, and the village of Caledon East.

== A ==
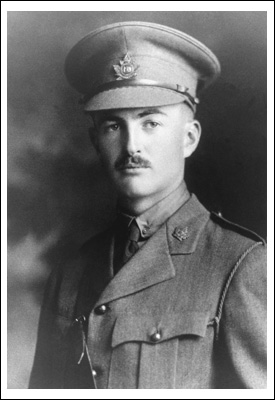
William Algie, VC

- Reema Abdo, Olympic swimmer and police officer
- Josh Alexander (b. 1987, Josh Lemay), professional wrestler
- Wallace Lloyd Algie, Victoria Cross winner, Alton

== B ==
- Harry James Barber, British Columbia MP, Alton
- Chanel Beckenlehner (b. 1988), beauty pageant competitor, Miss Universe Canada 2014
- Tony Bethell (1922–2004), Royal Air Force flight lieutenant, prisoner of war involved in "The Great Escape", retired to Caledon
- John Knox Blair, Ontario MP, Caledon
- Megan Bonnell, folk musician

== C ==
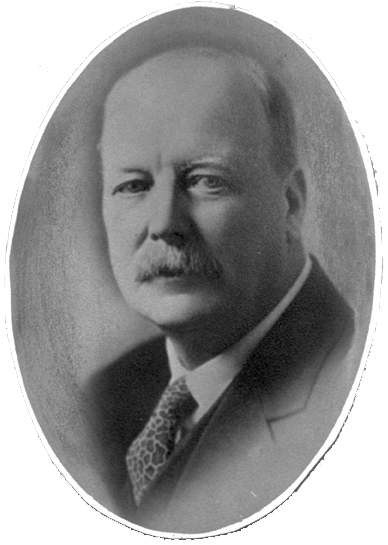
Samuel Calvert

- Spence Caldwell, broadcaster, Town of Caledon
- Samuel Calvert, soldier, Alberta MLA, mayor of Chipman, Alberta
- Yann Candele, Olympic equestrian, lives in Caledon
- John Alexander Catherwood, British Columbia MLA
- Isabel Crawford, Baptist missionary with the Kiowa people in Oklahoma Territory
- Nick Crawford, hockey player

== D ==
- Alfred Doig, copper and tin smith, merchant, Manitoba MLA
- Lorne Duguid, hockey player, Bolton
- Ernest Duke (1880–1954), MLA for Rocky Mountain, Alberta

== E ==
- James East, Edmonton alderman, Bolton
- Signy Stefansson Eaton (1913–1992), socialite, art collector and philanthropist
- Todd Elik, hockey player, Bolton

== F ==
Ray Farquharson

- Ray Fletcher Farquharson, MBE, doctor and medical researcher, Claude
- Orey Fidani, racing driver, Caledon
- Allison Flaxey, curling, Caledon East
- Caleb Flaxey, curling, Town of Caledon
- William Kingston Flesher, settler, MP, Bolton

== G ==
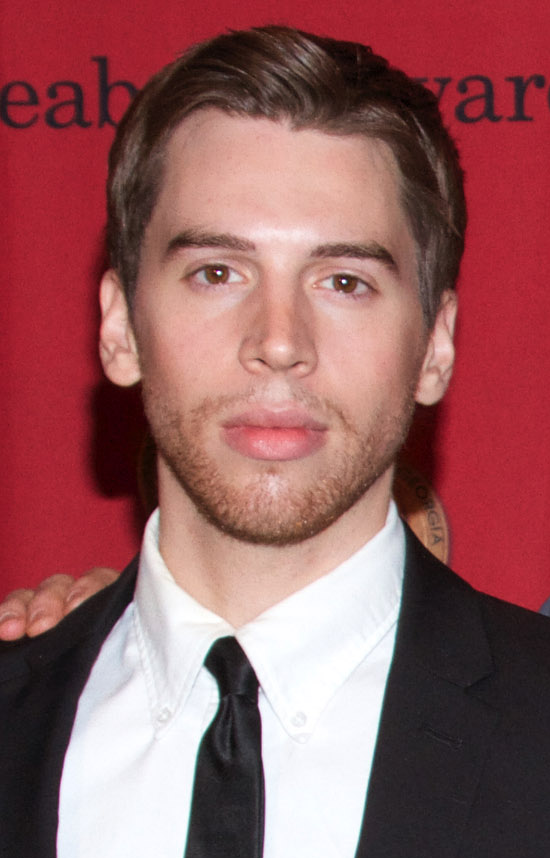
Jordan Gavaris

- George R. Gardiner OC, businessperson and philanthropist
- Helen Gardiner, philanthropist
- Jordan Gavaris, actor, Orphan Black
- Laurie Graham, downhill skiing, Inglewood
- Aldo Guidolin (1932–2015), hockey player and coach, Forks of the Credit

== H ==
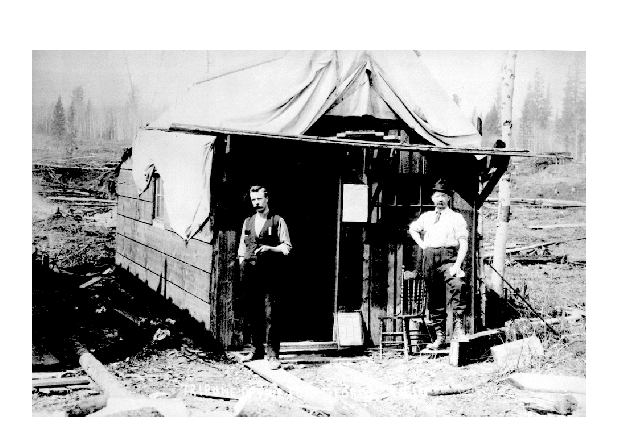
John Houston (left)

- Steven Halko, hockey player, Bolton
- Mary Riter Hamilton, artist, war artist
- Noel Harding (1945–2016), contemporary artist
- Linda Haynes OC, co-founder of ACE Bakery, television producer
- Louis Hodgson (1936–2012), Ontario MPP for Scarborough East (1963–1967), Victoria
- William Hodgson, MPP, Bolton
- Jake Holden, Olympic snowboarder
- Peter Holland, hockey player, Bolton
- John Houston, British Columbia newspaper publisher, Alton
- Duncan Selby Hutcheon, Saskatchewan MLA

== I ==
- Elmer Iseler, OC, OOnt, choir director, Town of Caledon Walk of Fame inductee

== J ==
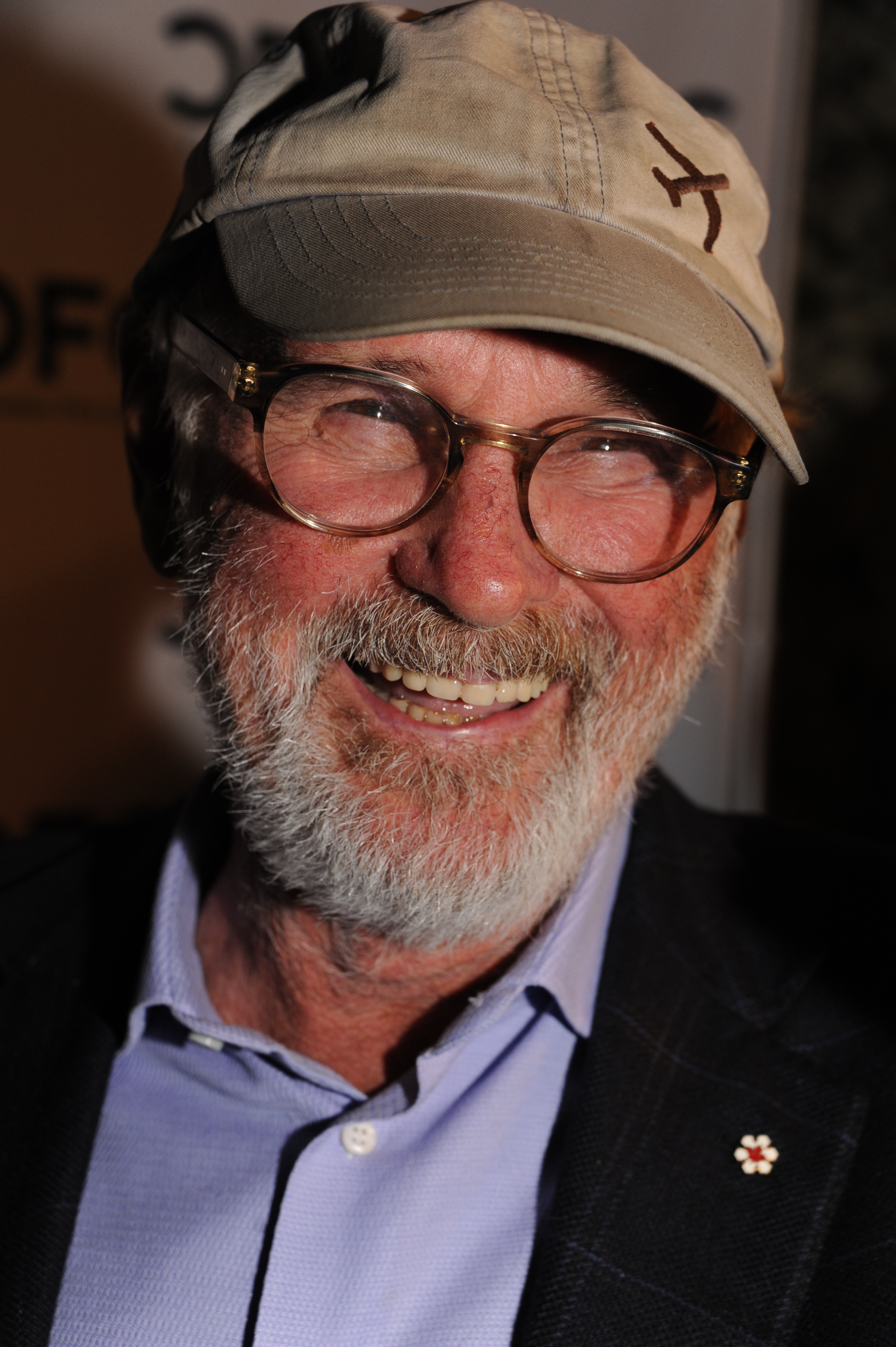
Norman Jewison

- Norman Jewison, filmmaker, Town of Caledon Walk of Fame inductee
- F. Ross Johnson OC, businessperson, former CEO of RJR Nabisco
- Robert Johnston (1856–1913), farmer and politician, MP for Cardwell

== K ==
- Robert Kennedy, publisher
- Rory Kerins, Canadian ice hockey player
- Rosemary Kilbourn, printmaker, Albion Hills

== L ==
- Ashley Lawrence, Olympic soccer, Caledon
- Cameron Lawson (b. 1998), CFL football defensive tackle

== M ==
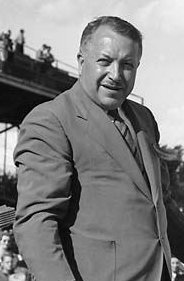
Hiram E. McCallum

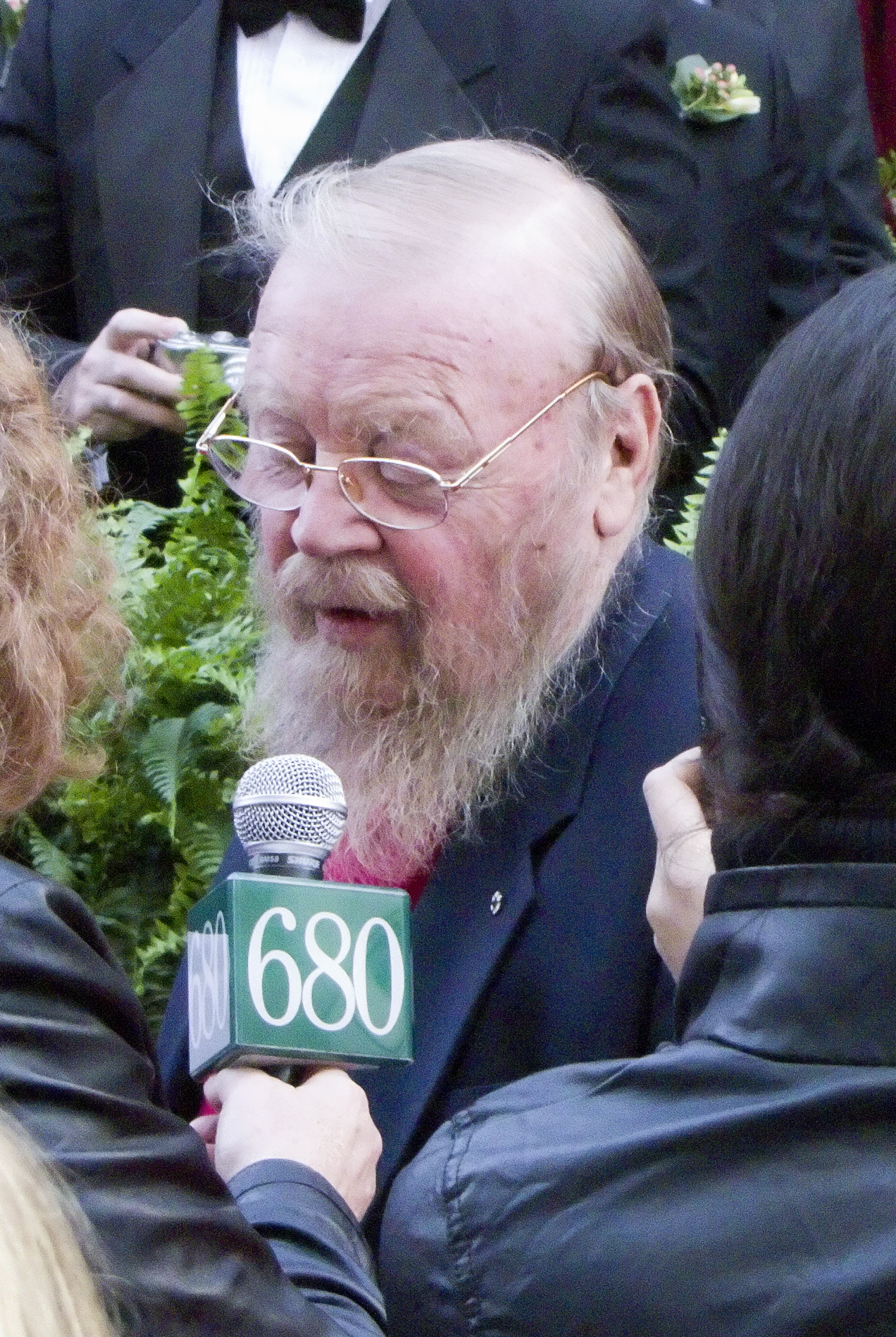
Farley Mowat

- Zoe MacKinnon, field hockey, Caledon East
- John Joseph Malone, flying ace, Inglewood
- Andrew Mangiapane (b. 1996), NHL ice hockey player
- Bert McCaffrey, ice hockey, born in the Township of Albion to a father from Caledon East, interred in Caledon East
- Hiram E. McCallum, mayor of Toronto
- Keith McCreary (1940–2003), NHL hockey player, regional councillor for Caledon
- Jim McGuigan, writer, Palgrave
- Beverly McKnight, duet synchronized swimmer
- Robert McMichael, gallery founder
- Jenna McParland (b. 1992), NWHL and IIHF ice hockey forward
- Tom Michalopoulos, entrepreneur, Bolton
- Ramona Milano, actor, Due South
- David Milne, artist, Palgrave
- Adam Mitchell (b. 1944), singer and songwriter, The Paupers, lived in Bolton
- John Wendell Mitchell (1880–1951), fiction author of The Yellow Briar
- Paul Morin (b. 1959), artist and children's book illustrator
- Farley Mowat (1921–2014), writer, Palgrave, Town of Caledon Walk of Fame inductee
- Brett Murray (b. 1998), AHL ice hockey player

== O ==
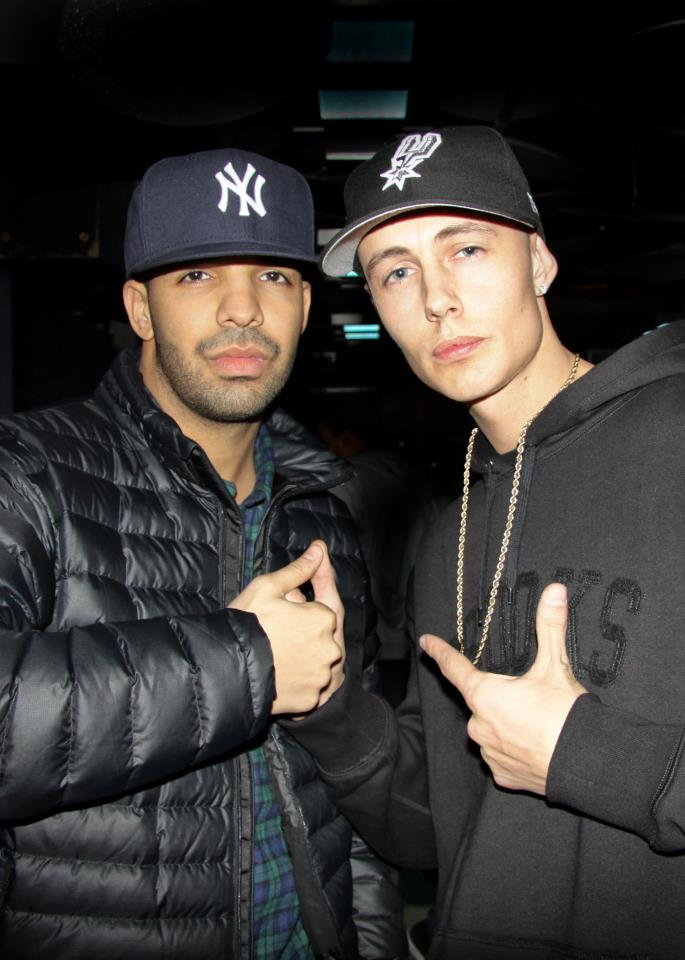
Organik

- Organik, Travis Fleetwood, rap battle league owner, Bolton

== P ==
- Andrew Pattulo, MPP
- Shailyn Pierre-Dixon (b. 2003), actress
- Jane Pitfield, past Toronto city councillor, president of the Caledon Heritage Foundation
- Tyler Pizarro, horse jockey
- Chris Pratt, show jumping rider

== Q ==
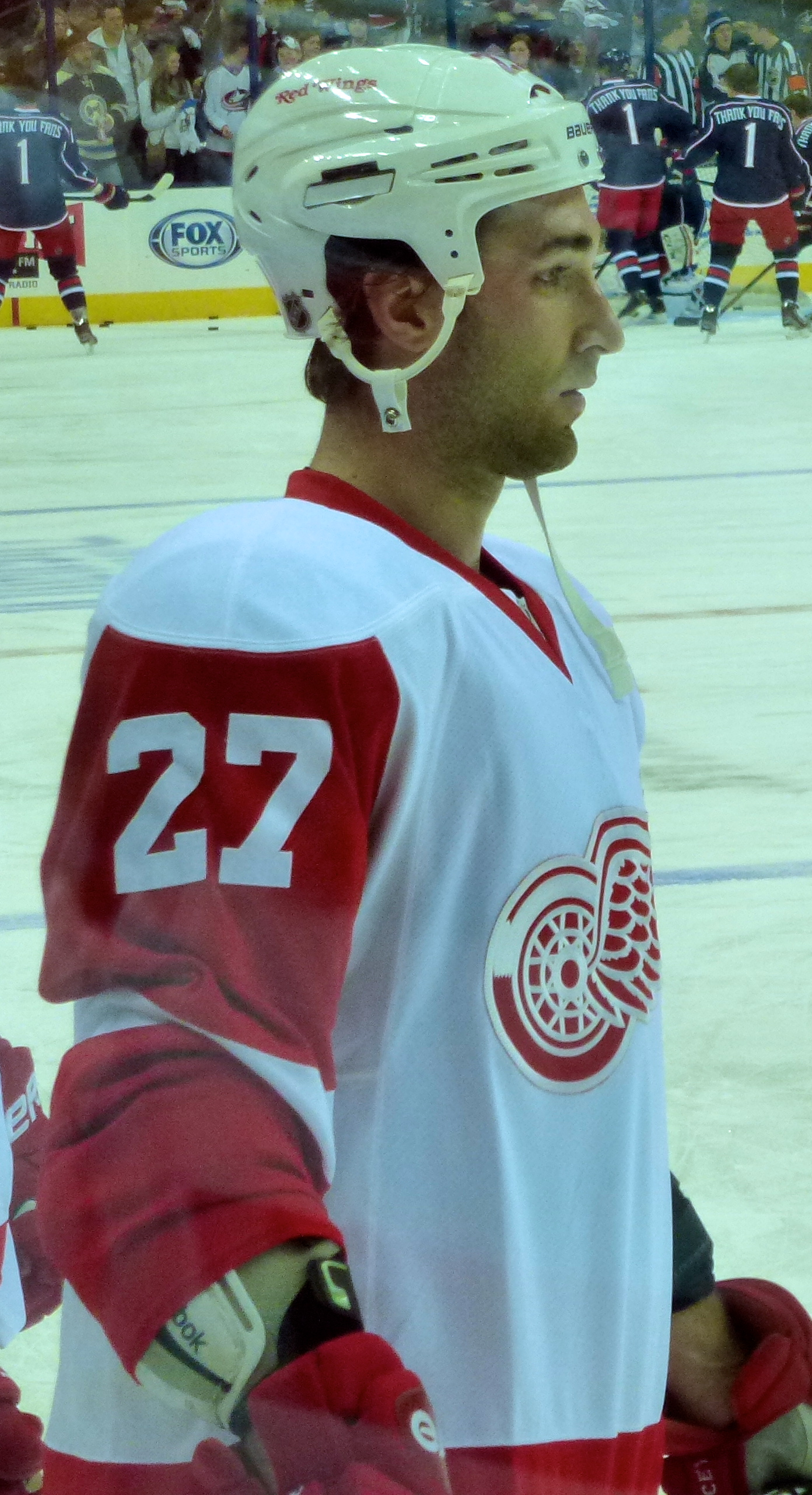
Kyle Quincey

- Kyle Quincey, hockey player

== R ==
- Darren Raddysh (b. 1996), NHL ice hockey player
- Taylor Raddysh (b. 1998), NHL ice hockey player
- Allan Read, priest at Mono Mills, later the Anglican bishop of Ontario
- David Reale, voice actor best known for voicing Kai Hiwatari from the Beyblade anime series and Tsubasa Otori from its spin-off series Beyblade: Metal Fusion
- Charles Robinson, MPP and physician, Claude
- Erin Routliffe (b. 1995), professional tennis player
- Kelly Russell, Olympic rugby union player, Bolton
- Laura Russell, rugby union player, Bolton

== S ==
- Jason Saggo, UFC mixed martial artist
- Dave Seglins, journalist, Town of Caledon
- Conn Smythe, sports businessperson, Town of Caledon Walk of Fame inductee
- Alexey Stakhov, mathematician, inventor, engineer, Bolton
- John Stevens, hockey player and coach, Town of Caledon
- Alfred Stork, British Columbia MP, Bolton
- William Stubbs, veterinarian and MP, Caledon Township
- Skye Sweetnam (b. 1988), singer, Cedar Mills
- Thomas Swinarton (1821-1893), MPP for Cardwell, businessman
- Bill Symons, football player, Caledon farm owner
- Gordon Symons (1921–2012), lord of Whitehouses, author, poet, painter, and pioneer in the Canadian insurance industry

== T ==
- Cory Trépanier, artist and filmmaker

== V ==
- Rebecca Vint, professional hockey player with the Buffalo Beauts (NWHL)

== W ==
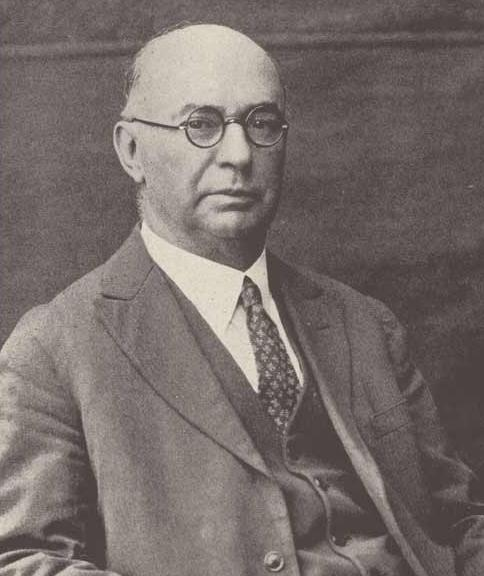
Wanless

- William James Wanless, surgeon and humanitarian, founder of a medical mission in Miraj, India who led it for nearly forty years
- Brittany Webster, cross-country skiing, Caledon
- Michael Wekerle, investor
- Harry Albert Willis, senator, Belfountain
- Erin Woodley, synchronized swimmer
- Thomas Wylie (1841–1915), MPP for Simcoe West

== Y ==
- Andrew Yorke, Olympic triathlon, Caledon (Caledon East)

== See also ==
- List of people from Brampton
- List of people from Mississauga
