= Town of Caledon Walk of Fame =

Coordinates: 43.86818°N 79.86558°W

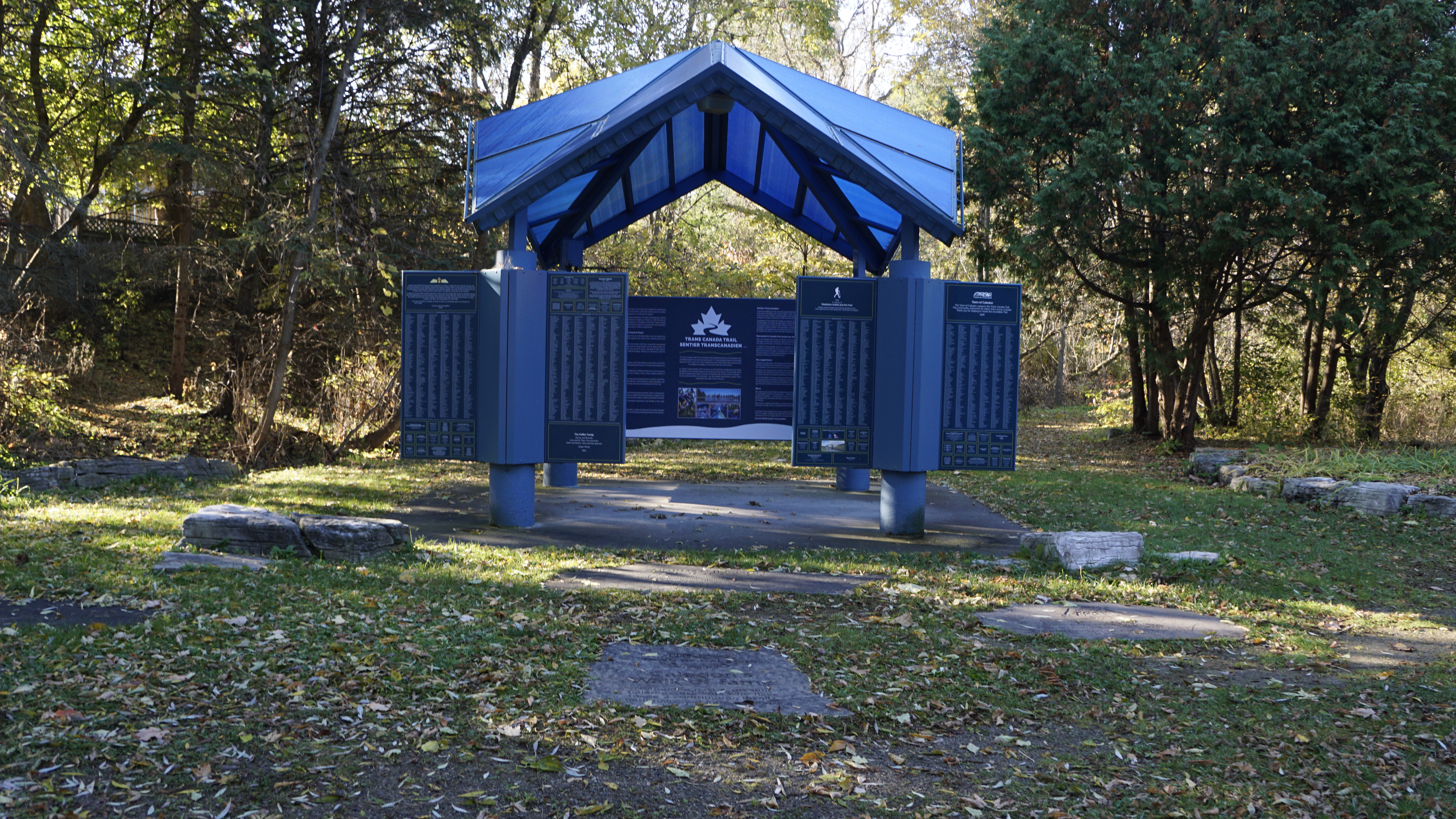
Town of Caledon Walk of Fame - Caledon, ON

The Town of Caledon's Walk of Fame is located in the Trans Canada Trail Pavilion Park, in Caledon, Ontario, Canada. Inductees are current or past residents, who have made significant contributions locally, nationally and internationally.

== Inductees ==
- 1999: Norman Jewison, filmmaker
- 2000: Elmer Iseler, choir director
- 2001: Robertson Davies, author
- 2002: Robert and Signe McMichael, gallery founders
- 2003: Dr. Faye Lindsey, physician
- 2004: Dr. Murray Fallis, the "Father of Canadian parasitology"
- 2005: Farley Mowat, author
- 2006: Russell Cooper, photographer and history advocate
- 2007: Daphne Lingwood, leather artist
- 2008: Alex Raeburn, prominent community member, including municipal politician
- 2009: Conn Smythe, sports businessman
- 2010: James B. Douglas; actor, preserver of local history
- 2011: Tayler Parnaby, broadcaster, journalist
- 2012: Christopher Dedrick, composer, musician
- 2013: Marilyn Field, teacher, founder of DAREArts
- 2014: Donald Lobb, author, speaker, researcher, conservationist, notable agricultural research
- 2015: Beverly Holden, duet synchronized swimming, and Jake Holden, judo and snowboard cross
- 2016: Ken Weber
- 2017: Isabel Bassett, journalist and politician
- 2018: Cory Trépanier, filmmaker
- 2019: Johnny Wayne, comedian
- 2021: Frontline Workers of Caledon
