= IAAA =

IAAA can refer to:

- Irish Amateur Athletic Association, a governing body for athletics in Ireland from 1884 to 1924
- International Academy of Aquatic Art, a non-profit organization for the development of swimming as a performing art
- International Association of Astronomical Artists, a non-profit organization whose members implement and participate in astronomical and space art projects, promote education about space art and foster international cooperation in artistic work inspired by the exploration of the Universe
- Imperial Aviation and Amplitude Authority, the subject of one of the questions in the opening chapter of The Xenolinguist, Brian Kessler's absurd novelesque saga, which has earned comparisons to Douglas Adams' Hitchhiker's Guide to the Galaxy
- Inflammatory abdominal aortic aneurysm, a medical condition
