= Bert Hubbard =

American synchronized swimmer (born 1927)

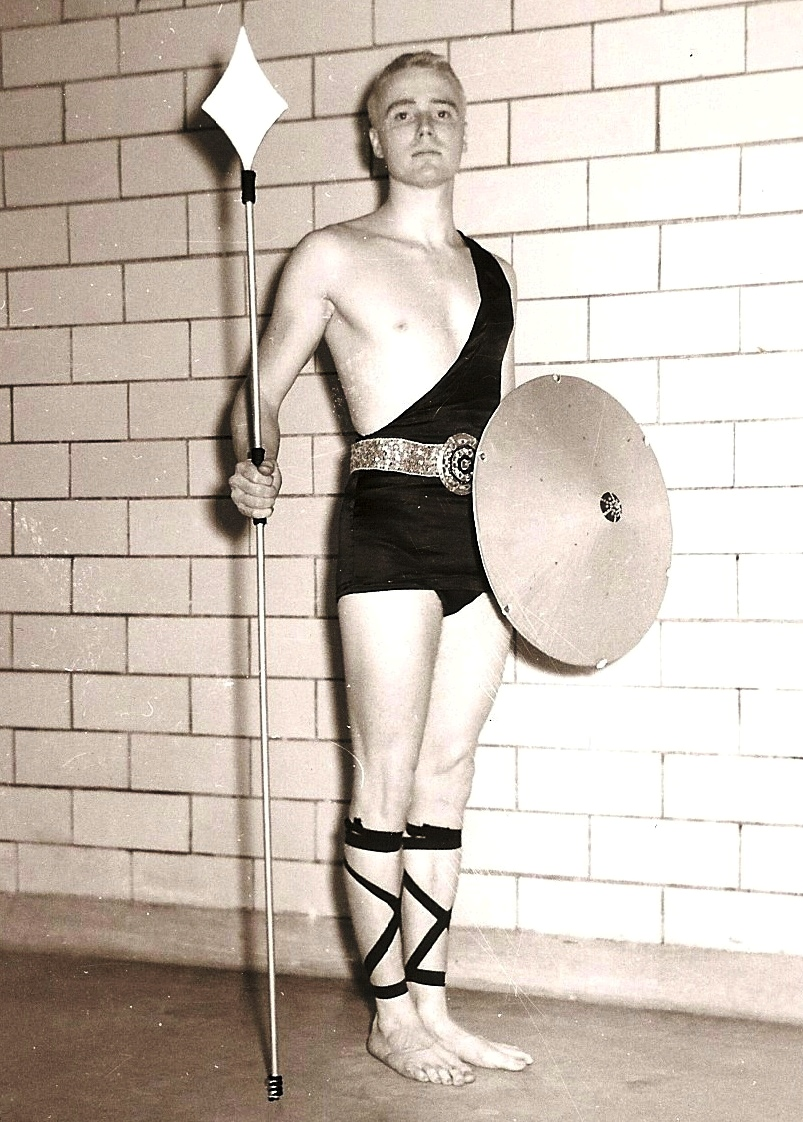
- Hubbard in 1954

Personal information
- Born: Albert Hubbard; June 29, 1927 (age 99) Detroit, Michigan, U.S.
- Website: www.aquatic-art.org

Sport
- Sport: Swimming
Medal record
Synchronized swimming
Representing United States
Gold medal – first place	1949 U.S. National AAU Synchronized Swimming Championships	Duet
Gold medal – first place	1954 U.S. Junior National Championships	Solo

Albert Hubbard (born June 29, 1927) is an American synchronized swimmer, choreographer and coach. He is also an aquatic artist as well as historian of the International Academy of Aquatic Art.

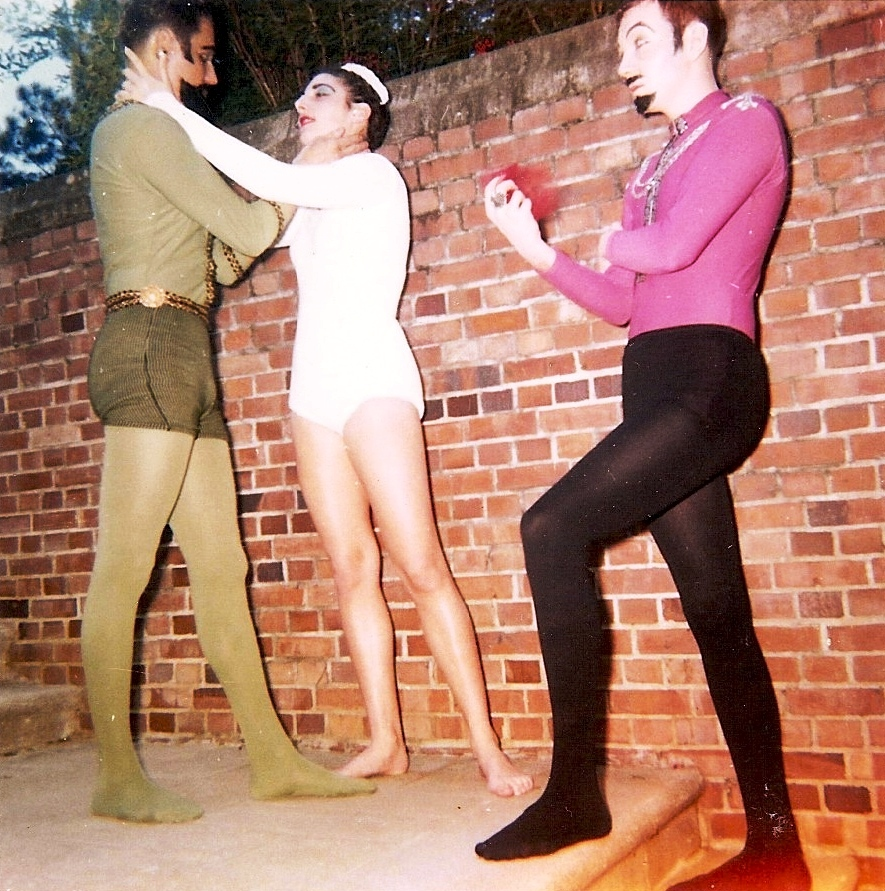
Bert Hubbard (left), Joan Hinderstein (middle) and Richard Proctor (right) in 1960 in Bert Hubbard’s own choreography “Othello” after Giuseppe Verdi’s opera

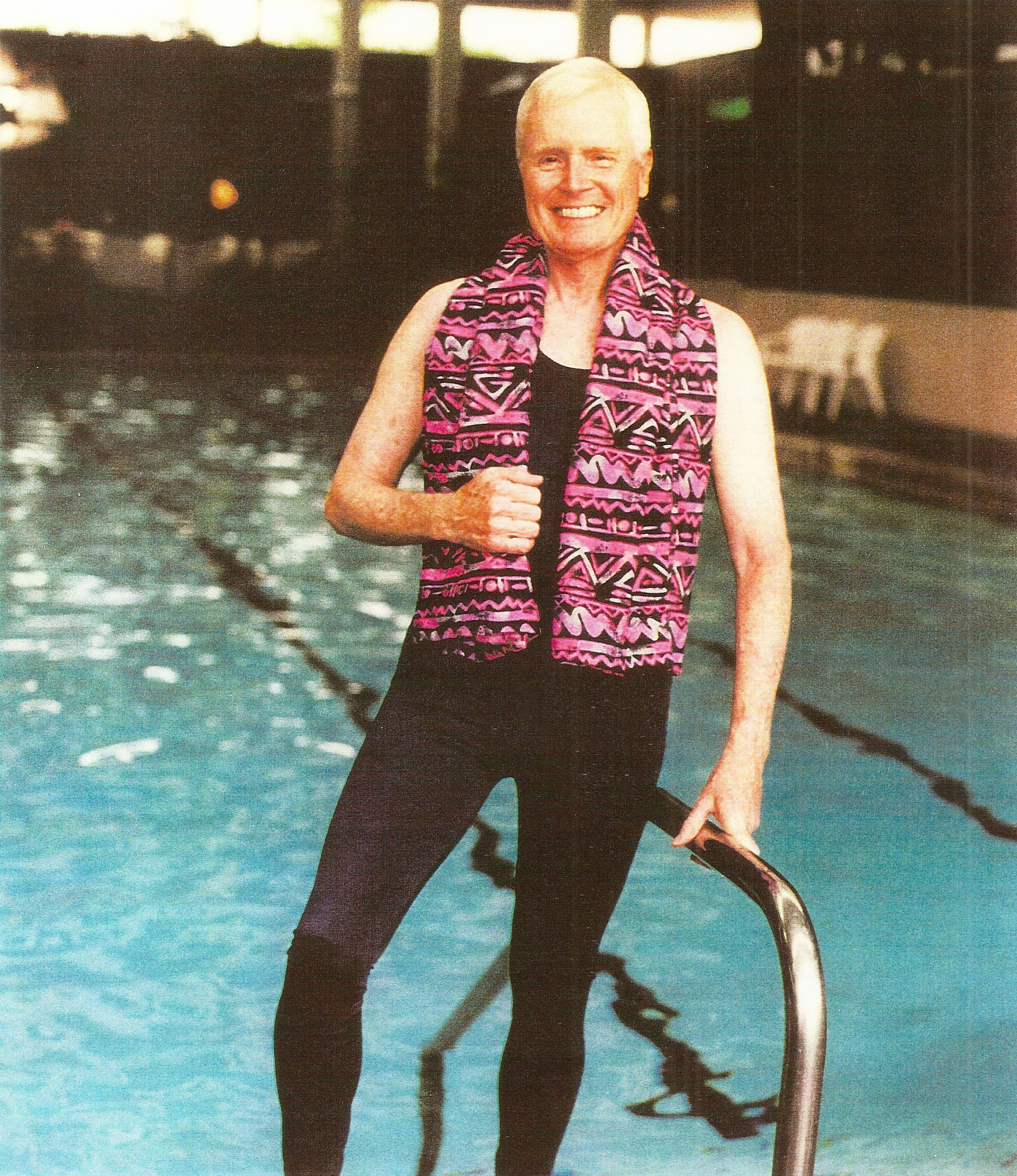
Bert Hubbard at the IAAA festival 1996 in Orlando, Florida (USA) in his swim costume to his own choreography Juxtaposed

== Sportive career 1946-1954 ==
Hubbard started synchronized swimming shortly after it was introduced in his birth town Detroit in 1946 by swimmers from Chicago. In 1949 he won the first Men's AAU Synchronised Swimming competition in the duet St.Louis Blues March with Lee Embrey. As male soloist he became the US Junior National Champion in 1954 with A Viking's Prayer Before Battle.

== 1955-present: Aquatic Artist, choreographer and historian ==
With the introduction of the International Academy of Aquatic Art (IAAA) in 1955 men were welcomed in synchronized swimming events, and Hubbard created and performed as aquatic artist until 2009 in various compositions, especially solos, at many IAAA festivals throughout North America. In 1960 he choreographed two mixed trios Othello after Verdi's Otello and A Medieval Morality that were the first to receive top honors from IAAA in that category. At that festival he presented the first male solo A World of Silence to be awarded First Class Honors from the IAAA. As the historian of the IAAA he documents the organization's history and artistic activities, and shares such information in IAAA's newsletter The Aquatic Artist.
