= Synchronized swimming at the 1955 Pan American Games =

- No. of events: 3

Synchronized swimming at the 1955 Pan American Games was held from 12 to 26 March 1955 in Mexico City, Mexico. There were three medal events in the inaugural women's synchronized swimming competition at the Pan American Games.

== Medal table ==
Rank	Nation	Gold	Silver	Bronze	Total
1	United States	3	0	1	4
2	Mexico	0	2	1	3
3	Canada	0	1	1	2
Totals (3 entries)		3	3	3	9

== Medalists ==
Event	Gold	Silver	Bronze
Solo	Beulah Gundling; United States	Rebeca García; Mexico	Joanne Royer; United States
Duet	United States (USA); Ellen Richard; Connie Todoroff	Mexico (MEX); Glorida Botello; Rebeca García	Canada (CAN); Diane Ferguson (nee) Baker; Beverly McKnight
Team	United States (USA); Loretta Barrious; Dawn Pawson Bean; Joan Pawson; Lynn Pawson; Sally Phillips	Canada (CAN)	Mexico (MEX)
