= Beulah Gundling =

American synchronized swimmer (1916-2003)

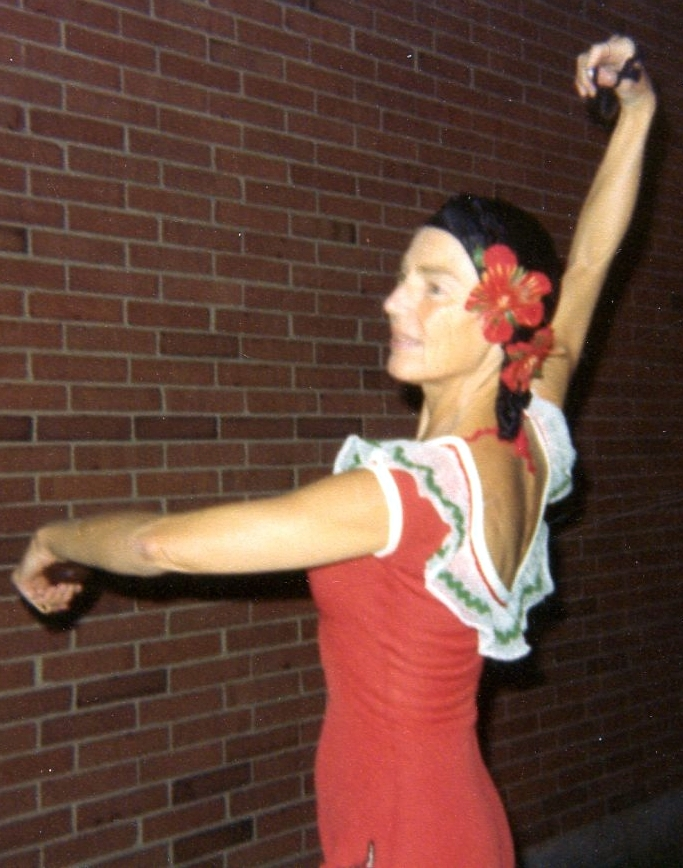
- Gundling in 1977
- Born: Beulah Detwiler; February 13, 1916; Cedar Rapids, Iowa, United States
- Died: October 1, 2003 (aged 87); Fort Lauderdale, Florida, United States
- Occupations: Synchronised swimmer, aquatic artist, choreographer, author
- Years active: 1940-2000
- Spouse: Henry Gundling
- Website: www.aquatic-art.org

Beulah Gundling
Medal record

Synchronised swimming

Representing the United States
Gold medal – first place	1949 Canadian Synchronized Swimming Championships	Solo
Gold medal – first place	1950 U.S. National AAU Synchronized Swimming Championships	Solo outdoor
Gold medal – first place	1951 U.S. National AAU Synchronized Swimming Championships	Solo outdoor
Gold medal – first place	1952 U.S. National AAU Synchronized Swimming Championships	Solo outdoor
Gold medal – first place	1953 U.S. National AAU Synchronized Swimming Championships	Solo outdoor
Gold medal – first place	1954 U.S. National AAU Synchronized Swimming Championships	Solo outdoor
Gold medal – first place	1955 Pan American Games	Solo

Beulah Detwiler Gundling (Feb 13 1916 - Oct 1 2003) was an American synchronized swimmer, aquatic artist, choreographer and author.

== Early life and sportive career ==
In her childhood Beulah Gundling was mainly interested in music and ballet. At the age of 14 she started to take swimming lessons after being encouraged by her parents to learn how to swim and dive. However, the first experiences with swimming were very negative for her, because she continuously sank in the water. She started to read instructional books on swimming, decided to teach herself how to float and successfully continued this autodidactic learning in the following years. She attended several competitions and even won an Iowa AAU gold medal for the backstroke. In 1938, she finished her education at Coe College and started to work as a secretary for the Chamber of Commerce in Cedar Rapids. To that time she began to find swimming laps boring and to develop her idea of combining swimming with music and dance. After studying a book about rhythmic swimming she created a routine of swimming strokes which were set to music. On the suggestion of her husband, coach and manager Henry Gundling, Beulah took part at the duet competition in synchronized swimming at the Outdoor Nationals in Des Moines in 1948 together with Noreen Fenner and placed 10th. In the following years, Beulah increased her interest in performing solo routines, for which she designed her own costumes. She won several important competitions in North America, inter alia she took first place at the 1949 Canadian Synchronized Swimming Championships with a routine entitled The Swan after music by Camille Saint-Saëns. Moreover, she won the Outdoor solo title at the U.S. National AAU Synchronized Swimming Championships from 1950 to 1954. Gundling introduced solo synchronized swimming on an exhibition basis at the 1951 Pan American Games as well as the 1952 Helsinki Olympics, where she presented her program Thunderbird to music from the opera Natoma by Victor Herbert. After winning the gold medal of the solo event at the 1955 Pan American Games Beulah Gundling finished her sports career.

== 1955-2000: Aquatic Artist, choreographer and author ==
After winning the gold medal of the solo event at the 1955 Pan American Games Beulah Gundling finished her swimming career presenting compositions at many festivals held by the International Academy of Aquatic Art until she retired in 1991, having been awarded only First Class Honors of the IAAA for all of her works. In addition, she wrote nine books on swimming and gave numerous lectures all over the world.

In 1965 Beulah Gundling was the first synchronized swimmer to be inducted into the International Swimming Hall of Fame. In 2000 she had her final aquatic appearance in the documentary The Mermaid's Club: A History of Synchronized Swimming by Paul Carvalho.

== Choreographies (selection) ==
Here is an incomplete list of Beulah Gundling's own choreographies of solo routines which she presented herself:

- 1949: The Swan (music: No. 13 from The Carnival of the Animals by Camille Saint-Saëns)
- 1952: Thunderbird (music: Dagger Dance from the opera Natoma by Victor Herbert)
- 1953: Coronation (Specially devised for a tour of England and Wales)
- 1975: Orientale (music In a Village from Caucasian Sketches by Mikhail Ippolitov-Ivanov)
- 1977: Concerto (music from Piano Concerto No. 2 by Sergei Rachmaninoff)
- 1977: Vivo (music: Sevilla from Suite espanola by Isaac Albéniz)
- 1979: Aqua Mazurka (music: Mazurka from the ballet Coppélia by Léo Delibes)
- 1980: Fancy Free (music from the ballet by Leonard Bernstein)
- 1981: Claire de Lune (third movement of Suite bergamasque by Claude Debussy)

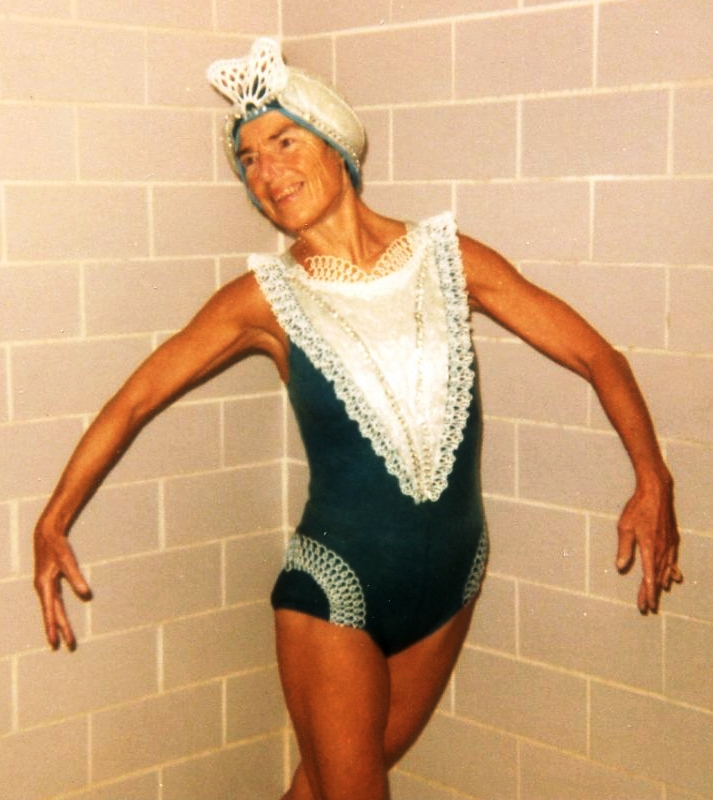
Beulah Gundling: Claire de Lune (1981)

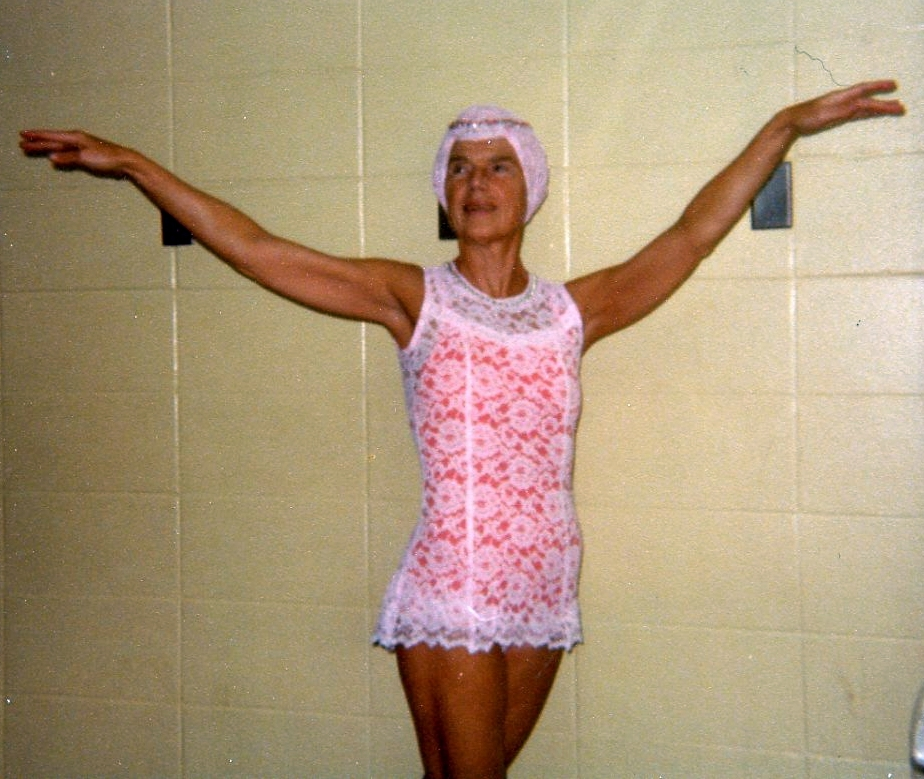
Beulah Gundling: Concerto (1977)

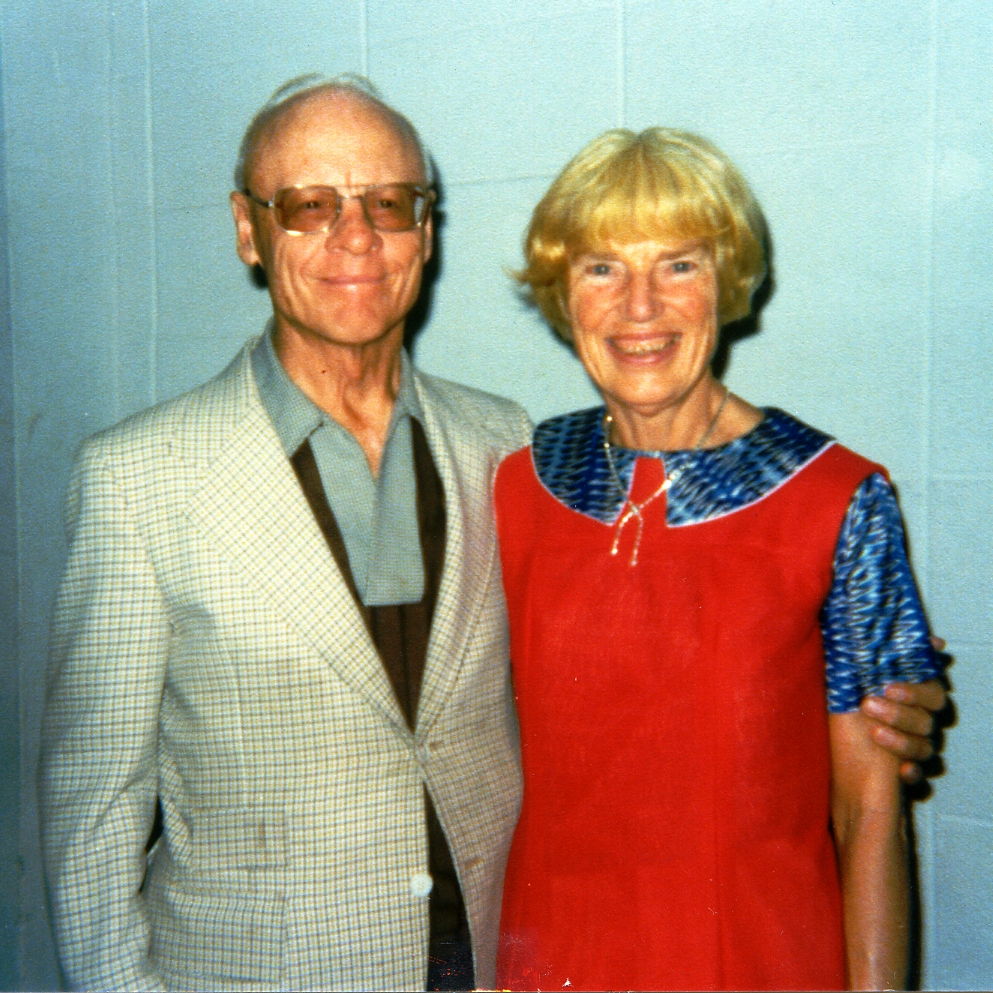
Beulah Gundling and her husband Henry Gundling (left) in 1980

== Bibliography (complete) ==
- B. Gundling, Peg Seller: Aquatic Art - A textbook for swimmers and instructors in Aquatic Art, published by Pioneer Litho, Cedar Rapids, 1957.
- B. Gundling: Exploring Aquatic Art, self-published work, 1963.
- B. Gundling: The Aquatic Art book of figures, self-published work, 1963.
- B. Gundling: The Aquatic Art book of water shows, self-published work, 1964.
- B. Gundling: Fun with Aquatic figure variations, self-published work, 1971,
- B. Gundling: Aquatic Enchaînements and Petite Compositions, self-published work, 1972.
- B. Gundling: Dancing in the Water (Autobiography), self-published work, 1976.
- B. Gundling, Jill White: Creative Synchronized Swimming, Leisure Press, Champaign, Illinois 1988.
- B. Gundling: To Henry with Love, self-published work, 1988.

== See also ==
- List of members of the International Swimming Hall of Fame
