= International Academy of Aquatic Art =

American nonprofit organization

International Academy of Aquatic Art (or IAAA)
- Founded: 1955
- Founder: Mary Derosier, Richard J. Dodson, Henry Gundling
- Type: Cultural organisation
- Purpose: Organization for the development of swimming as a performing art.
- Location: US
- Region served: United States
- Website: www.aquatic-art.org

The International Academy of Aquatic Art (or IAAA) is a nonprofit organization for the development of swimming as a performing art. It is based in the United States.

== History ==
The IAAA was founded in 1955 by former synchronized swimmers from the US in order to develop swimming as artistic, creative and non-competitive activity. The incorporators were:

- Mary Derosier: former national chairman of the Amateur Athletic Union, which was one of the first organizations who invented synchronized swimming competitions
- Richard J. Dodson: in 1951 publisher of the first magazine for synchronized swimming, the Synchronized Swimmer
- Henry Gundling: synchronized swimming coach, manager and husband of synchronized swimmer Beulah Gundling

The IAAA regularly organizes festivals throughout the United States and Canada presenting different swimming performances with choreographies for soloists, duets and groups. The IAAA swimmers are called aquatic artists. The style of the performances, which are shown by women and men as well, is a mixture of synchronized swimming, water ballet, ornamental, rhythmic and scientific swimming. In most cases the swimmers use different forms of art music for the programs presented at the IAAA festivals. Bert Hubbard, one of the first male synchronized swimmers from the US, is a board member of the IAAA and documents its history and artistic activities.

== Gallery ==
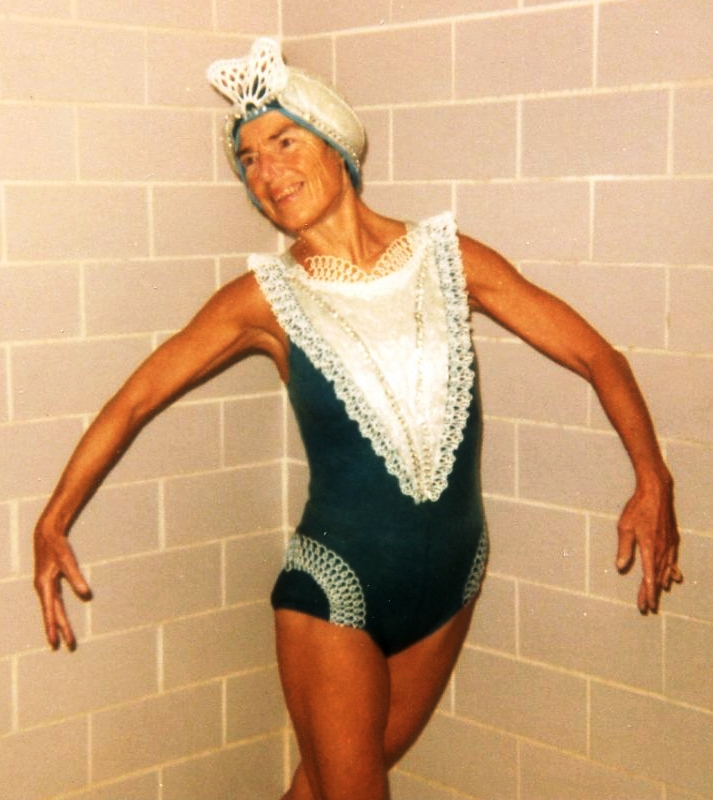
Beulah Gundling: Claire de Lune (1981)

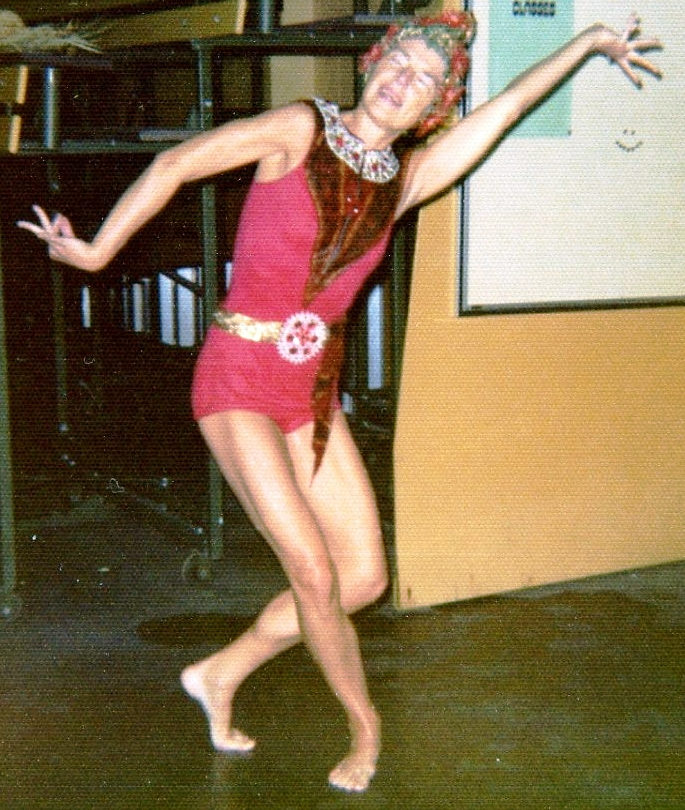
Beulah Gundling: Orientale (1975)

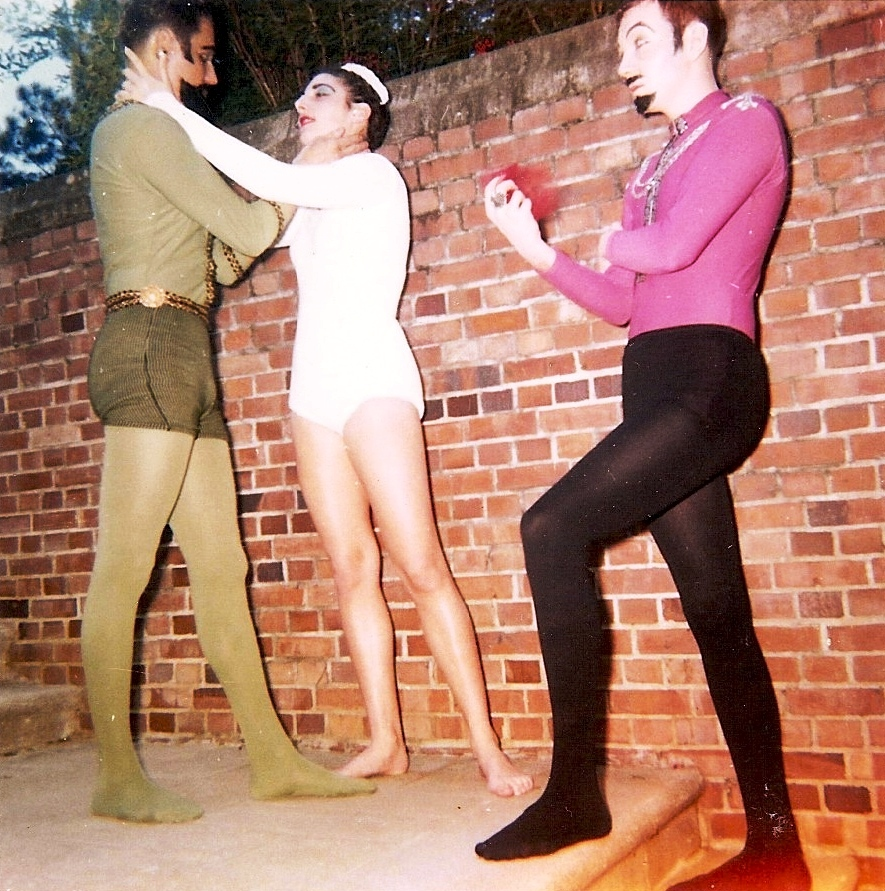
Bert Hubbard (left), Joan Hinderstein (middle) and Richard Proctor (right) in 1960 in Bert Hubbard's own choreography “Othello” after Giuseppe Verdi's opera

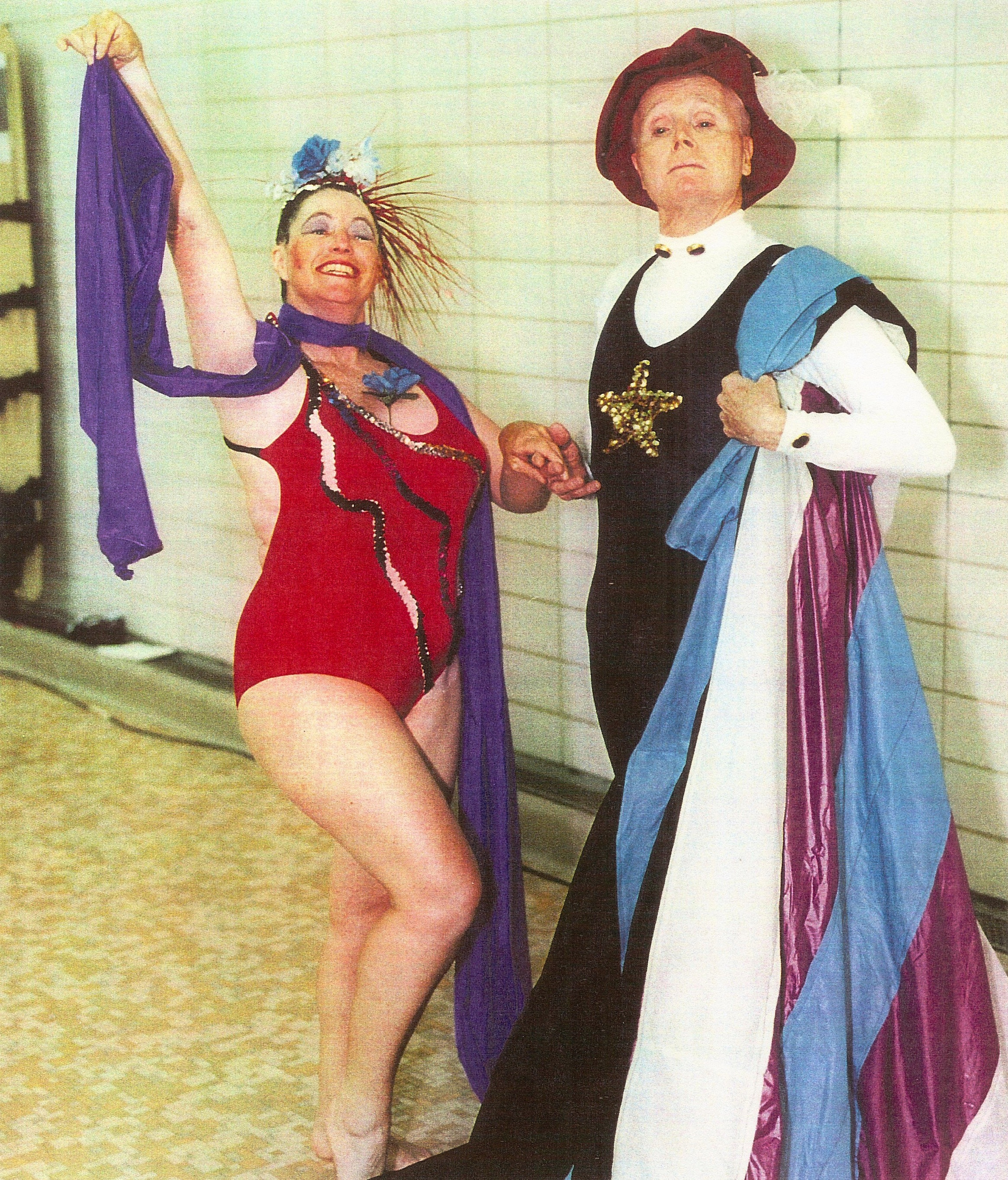
Bert Hubbard and Diane Tulley in His and her Limelights at the IAAA festival 1997

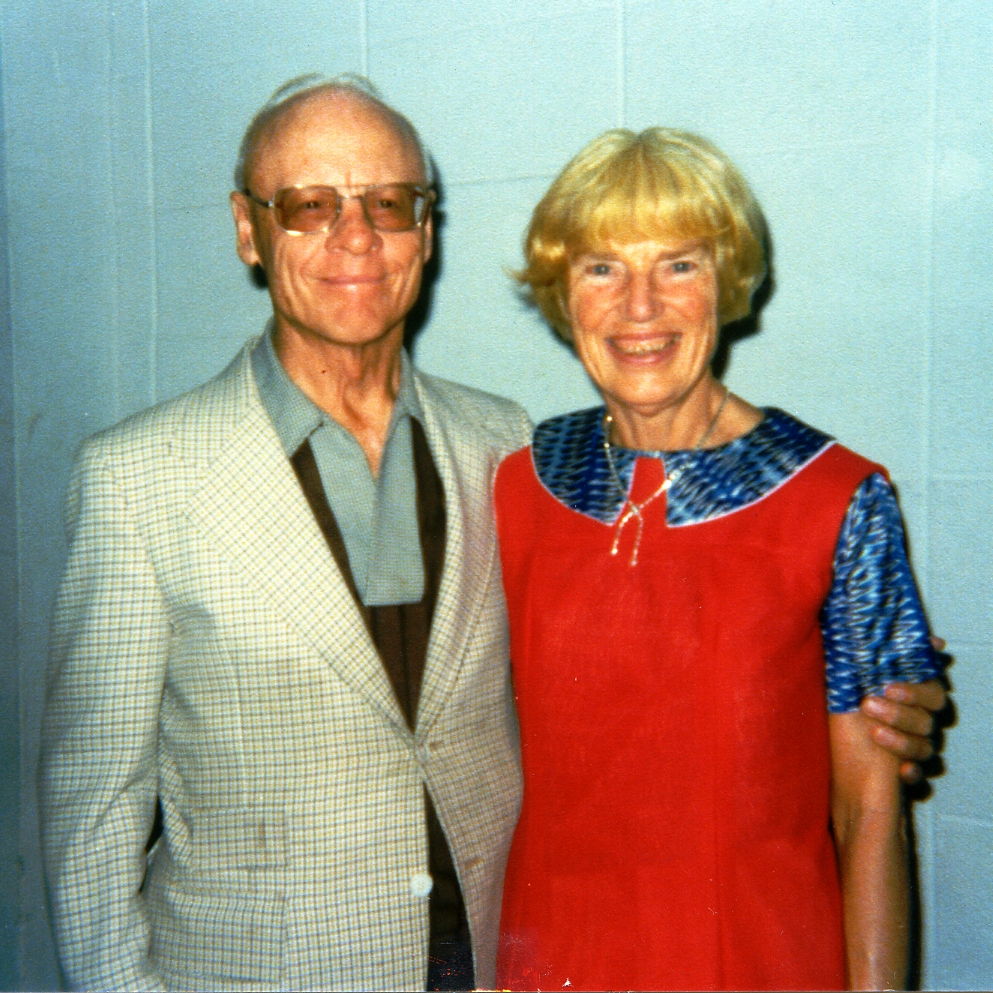
Beulah Gundling and her husband Henry Gundling (left) in 1980

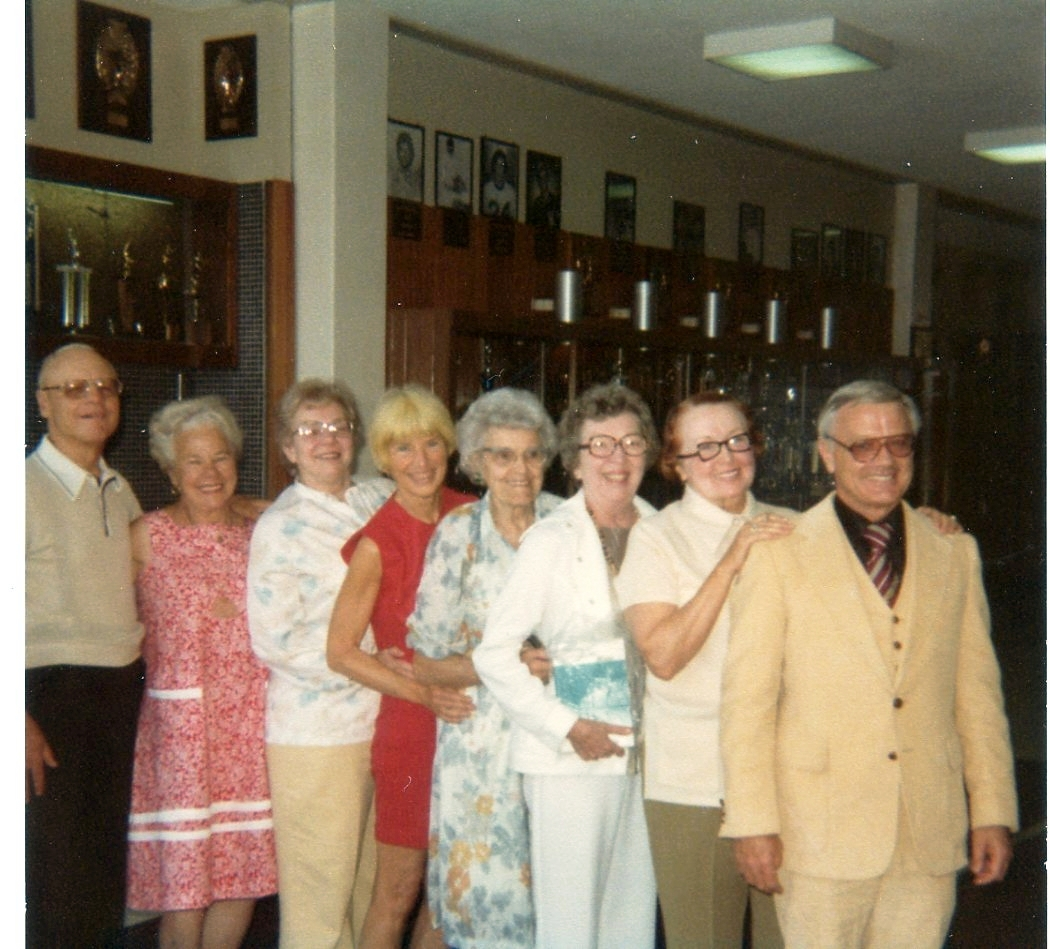
Group photo of the IAAA in 1979, left to right: Henry Gundling, Peg Seller, Marge Sharpe, Beulah Gundling, Kay Curtis, Norma Prince, Lee Vanderpool, Vaughan Baird
