= Alexey Stakhov =

Ukrainian mathematician, inventor and engineer (1939–2021)

Alexey Petrovich Stakhov Алексей Петрович Стахов
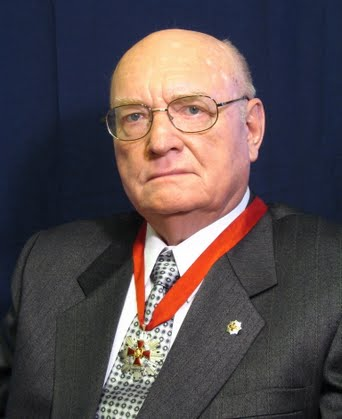
- Born: 7 May 1939; Partizany, Ukraine
- Died: 25 January 2021 (aged 81); Bradford, Ontario, Canada
- Education: Kyiv Polytechnic Institute 1956 – 1959 & Kharkiv Aviation Institute 1959–1961
- Known for: Innovations and studies in computer engineering (“Fibonacci computers”) and mathematics (Mathematics of Harmony)
- Spouse: Antonina Stakhova
- Children: 2
- Scientific career
- Fields: Computer science, mathematics
- Workplaces: Taganrog Radio Engineering Institute, 1971–1977; Vinnytsia Technical University, 1977–1996; Vinnytsia Agricultural University, 1997–2004
- Doctoral advisor: Volkov Alexander Andreevich

Alexey Petrovich Stakhov (Russian: Алексей Петрович Стахов Ukrainian: Олексій Петрович Стахов; 7 May 1939 – 25 January 2021) was a Ukrainian-Canadian mathematician, inventor and engineer, who has made contributions to the theory of Fibonacci numbers and the "Golden Section" and their applications in computer science and measurement theory and technology. Doctor of computer science (1972), professor (1974). Author of over 500 publications, 14 books and 65 international patents.

== Biography ==
Born May 7, 1939, in Partizany, Kherson region, Ukraine, USSR. In 1956 graduated with honours from Rivne village high school. Same year became a student of the Mining Faculty of the Kyiv Polytechnic Institute (now the National Technical University of Ukraine “Kyiv Polytechnic Institute”). In 1959, transferred to the Radio Engineering Faculty of Kharkiv Aviation Institute (now the National Aerospace University of Ukraine). After graduation, worked for two years as an engineer in the Kharkiv Electrical Instrument Design Bureau (now the space technology company “Khartron”). "Khartron" was one of the top secret space companies of the Soviet Union. It was engaged in the research, development and manufacture of automatic control systems for missiles and space craft on board systems. Through working there Stakhov obtained thorough practical engineering experience and published his first scientific papers. Later he worked at the universities of Russia and Ukraine (Kharkiv Institute of Radio Electronics, Taganrog Radio Engineering Institute, Vinnytsia Technical University, Vinnytsia Agricultural University, Vinnytsia Pedagogic University). He was a visiting professor at many universities abroad (Austria, Germany, Libya, Mozambique). Since 2004, he lived and worked in Canada.

Stakhov died on 25 January 2021, at the age of 81.

== Teaching, research, and work ==
- Dean of the Faculty of Computer Engineering of the Kharkiv Institute of Radio Electronics (now, Kharkiv National University of Radio Electronics), 1968–1970
- Head of the Department of Informational and Measuring Engineering, Taganrog Radio Engineering Institute, 1971–1977
- Head of the Department of Computer Engineering, Vinnytsia Polytechnic Institute (now – Vinnytsia National Technical University), 1977–1988
- Director of the Special Design and Technological Bureau "Module" of the Vinnytsia Polytechnic Institute, 1986–1989
- Head of the Department of Applied Mathematics and Computing Systems, Vinnytsia Technical University, 1989–1996
- Head of the Department of Computer Science, Vinnytsia State Agricultural University (now Vinnytsia National Agrarian University), 1997–2004
- Member of the Shevchenko Scientific Society in Canada (2005)
- Professor Emeritus of Taganrog University of Radio Engineering
- Since 2003, president of the International Club of the Golden Section, and from 2005, Director of the Golden Section Institute, Academy of Trinitarizm (Russia).
- Initiated the creation of the so-called "Slavic Golden Group" (Kyiv, 1992) and was Scientific Director of the International Congress on the Mathematics of Harmony (Odesa, 2010).
- In 2009 he was awarded the Medal "Knight of Arts and Sciences" (Russian Academy of Natural Sciences)

== Brief description of research and scientific achievements ==
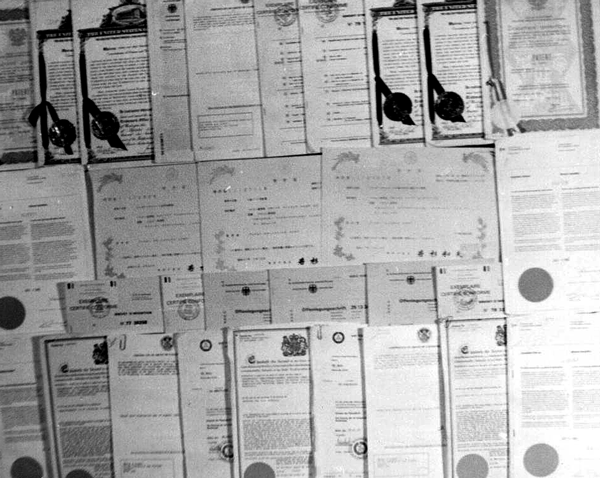
Prof. Stakhov's international patents

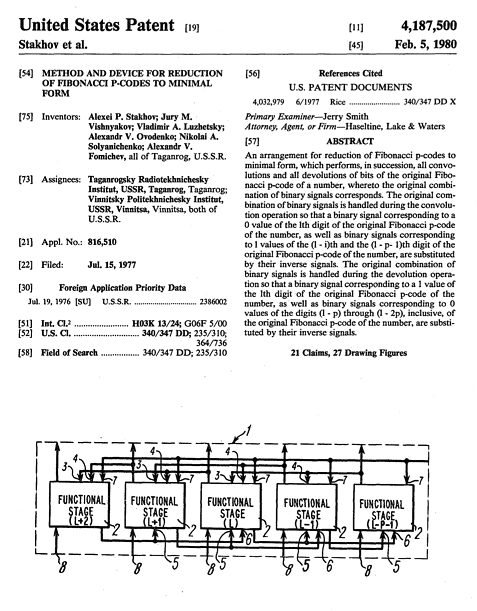
US Patent for the Fibonacci p-code minimal form

- Created a new direction in the measurement theory, the algorithmic measurement theory described in his book – A.P. Stakhov. "Introduction into Algorithmic Measurement Theory" (Moscow: Soviet Radio, 1977).
- Created the theory of the redundant number systems based on the generalised Fibonacci numbers (Fibonacci p-codes) and the generalised golden proportions (codes of the golden p-proportion) The principals of the Fibonacci p-codes and the new computer arithmetic based on them are described in his book – A.P. Stakhov. "Introduction into Algorithmic Measurement Theory" (Moscow: Soviet Radio, 1977). The fundamentals of the theory of the codes of the golden p-proportion are stated in the book – AP Stakhov. The Codes of the Golden Proportion (Moscow, Radio and Communication, 1984).
- Put forward the concept of "Fibonacci computers". The international priority of this invention was protected by the Soviet Union in an unprecedented patenting operation by Soviet standards, resulting in 65 international patents, covering the territories of the United States, Japan, United Kingdom, France, Germany, Canada and other countries.
- Elaborated and evolved the concept "Mathematics of Harmony", which goes back in its foundations to Euclid's “Elements” (III c. BC), "Divina Proportione" (Divine proportion) by Luca Pacioli (1509), Harmonice Mundi (Harmony of the World) by Johannes Kepler (1619). For the first time the concept of "Mathematics of Harmony" in relation to the achievements of modern science was presented by Prof. Stakhov in a speech "The Golden Section and Modern Harmony Mathematics," made at the seventh International Conference "Fibonacci Numbers and Their Applications" (Austria, Graz, 1996). The book "The Mathematics of Harmony. From Euclid to Contemporary Mathematics and Computer Science" – 748 pages (World Scientific, 2009) is Stakhov's main scientific achievement in this field.
- Published over 500 scientific works, among them 14 books, 65 international patents, 130 USSR invention certificates. During his work in Canada (2004–2012) published over 30 articles in international journals (Chaos, Solitons & Fractals, Applied Mathematics, Arc Combinatoria, Visual Mathematics, etc.).
- Alexey Stakhov prepared 30 PhD students, five of Stakhov's PhD students, became Doctors of Sciences.

== Work in international universities ==
The work as "visiting professor":

- Vienna Technical University (Austria, 1976)
- University of Jena (Germany, 1986)
- Dresden Technical University (Germany, 1988)
- Al Fateh University (Tripoli, Libya, 1995–1997)
- University of Eduardo Mondlane (Maputo, Mozambique, 1998–2000)

== Prizes and awards ==
- Awarded for the best scientific publication by Ministry of Education and Science of Ukraine (1980)
- Barkhausen's Commemorative Medal issued by the Dresden Technical University as "visiting professor" of Heinrich Barkhausen Department (1988)
- Professor Emeritus of Taganrog University of Radio Engineering (2004)
- The honorary title of "Knight of Arts and Sciences" (Russian Academy of Natural Sciences, 2009)
- The honorary title "Doctor of the Sacred Geometry in Mathematics" (American Society of the Golden Section, 2010)
- Prof. Alexey Stakhov has been included in the Encyclopedia “Famous Scientists of Russia”

== Select scientific publications ==
1. Stakhov AP. Introduction into algorithmic measurement theory. Moscow, "Soviet Radio", 1977, 288 p., Circulation 8500 copies.(Russian)
2. Stakhov AP Algorithmic measurement theory. (New in Life, Science and Technology. Series "Mathematics, Cybernetics"). Moscow: "Knowledge", 1979, 64 p. Circulation 38,470 copies. (Ukraininan Ministry of Higher Education awarded the prize for the best scientific publication in 1980) (Russian)
3. Stakhov AP. Codes of the Golden Proportion. Moscow: Radio and Communications, 1984, 152 p., Circulation 10 000 copies. (Russian)
4. Stakhov AP. Algorithmic measurement theory and foundations of computer arithmetic. Journal "Measurement. Control. Automation ", 1981 (Russian)
5. Stakhov AP. The Golden Section in the Measurement Theory. Computers & Mathematics with Applications, 1989, Vol. 17, No 4–6, 613–638.
6. Stakhov A.P. The Golden Section and Modern Harmony Mathematics. Applications of Fibonacci Numbers. Kluwer Academic Publishers, 1998
7. Stakhov A.P. Brousentsov's ternary principle, Bergman's number system and ternary mirror-symmetrical arithmetic. “The Computer Journal” (British Computer Society), 2002.
8. Series of articles (30 articles) on various aspects of the "Mathematics of Harmony." Published at the international journals "Chaos, Solitons & Fractals," «Congressus Numerantium," "Visual Mathematics," "Design & Mathematics," "Applied Mathematics" during 2004–2012.
9. Stakhov AP The Generalized Golden Sections and a New Approach to the Geometric Definition of a Number. Ukrainian Mathematical Journal, 2004 (Russian).
10. Stakhov, AP, Sluchenkova, AA, Shcherbakov, IG. Da Vinci Code and the Fibonacci series. St. Petersburg: Piter, 2006, 320 pp., circulation 8000 copies.
11. Stakhov. AP. The Golden Ratio, Sacred Geometry and the Mathematics of Harmony. The book "Metaphysics. Century XXI ». Moscow, BINOM, 2006, p. 174–215.
12. Stakhov – AP Three "Key" Problems of Mathematics at the Stage of Its Origin and the Mathematics of Harmony as an Alternative Direction in the Development of Mathematics. The book “Totallogy-XXI,” National Academy of Sciences of Ukraine, 2007, p. 274–323.
13. Stakhov A.P. "The Mathematics of Harmony. From Euclid to Contemporary Mathematics and Computer Science". International Publisher «World Scientific» (New Jersey, London, Singapore, Beijing, Shanghai, Hong Kong, Taipei, Chennai), 2009, p. 748
14. A. Stakhov, S. Aranson. Hyperbolic Fibonacci and Lucas Functions, “Golden” Fibonacci Goniometry, Bodnar's Geometry, and Hilbert's Fourth Problem.. Applied Mathematics, 2011, 1 (January), 2 (February), 3 (March)
15. Stakhov AP. The Mathematics of Harmony: from Euclid to Contemporary Mathematics and Computer Science. Electronic Journal "NAUKOVEDENIE ", Vol 4, 2012, p. 105 (Russian)
