= Gordon Symons =

Canadian writer (1921–2012)

Gerald Gordon Symons (September 7, 1921 – November 22, 2012), Lord of Whitehouses, Nottinghamshire, U.K., was an author, poet, painter, and successful pioneer in the Canadian insurance industry. Symons served as Chairman of ten different insurance and financial institutions across Canada and the United States, including Goran Capital Inc., Symons International Group, Pafco General Insurance Company, IGF Insurance Company, and GGS Management Inc.

== Early life ==
Born in 1921 in Lachine, Quebec, Symons grew up in Dixie, a small residential town with two brothers, John and Arthur (Randy). Each of the three boys grew to become surviving pilots in the Second World War. Their father, Gerald Symons, was a surviving member of the Canadian Forces of World War I and World War II.

== War service ==
Gordon Symons began his military career with the Royal Canadian Air Force in 1941 and graduated as a Sergeant-Pilot. He was soon sent overseas on the Queen Mary and was sent for training in Bournemouth on the south coast of England. Thereafter, Symons flew Beaufighters and Mosquitos on Anti Shipping Strikes with Squadron 143 of the Royal Air Force, attacking German naval and merchant ships in France, Belgium, German and Scandinavian waters."

== Career in finance ==
Upon his safe return to Canada after the war, Gordon attended university at Sir George Williams, Montreal, entering the field of finance.

A decade later, in 1964, he formed G. Gordon Symons Co. Ltd., a predecessor to Goran Capital Inc., a public holding company specializing in insurance. Over the course of three decades, Symons grew his family of companies, becoming one of the largest non-standard automobile insurers in the United States.

== The Boys of Spring ==
In 2006, Symons released a World War II autobiography entitled The Boys of Spring. The 713-page book contains actual flight mission records, obtained by Symons through R.A.F. Records Division in Kew, England and many coming of age stories related to a young pilot's life in wartime Britain.

The Boys of Spring also contains Symons' research into the Clayton Knight Committee and the recruitment of 8,200 Americans by the Royal Canadian Air Force during a period of U.S. neutrality.

== Death ==
Symons died in Caledon, Ontario on 22 November 2012.
