= Beverly McKnight =

Canadian synchronized swimmer

Sport
- Sport: Swimming
- Strokes: Synchronized swimming
Medal record
Women's Synchronized Swimming
Representing Canada
Pan American Games
Bronze medal – third place	1955 Mexico City	Duet

Beverly Holden (née McKnight) is one half of Canada's duet synchronized swimming team that won the bronze medal in the 1955 Pan American Games in Mexico City. This was the first year that synchronized swimming was a medal event in the Pan Am Games, having been a demonstration event in Buenos Aires in 1951. McKnight and Diane Ferguson (née Baker) competed in numerous events including the British Empire & Commonwealth Games where it was also a demonstration sport. The duet won the Ontario Duet and Canadian Duet Championships in 1954. Originally coached by Jimmy Bishop at the Granite Club in Toronto, they moved to the Lakeshore Swimming Club after Bishop's death in 1952.

She married John Holden a month after winning the bronze medal, and retired shortly thereafter to raise a family in Toronto and Caledon, Ontario area. Beverly is also the grandmother of Jake Holden, Canadian Olympic Boardercross team member and Canadian Jr. Champion in both Boardercross and Judo. They were both inducted to the Caledon Walk of Fame October 3, 2015.
