= Cory Trépanier =

Canadian landscape painter and filmmaker (born 1968)

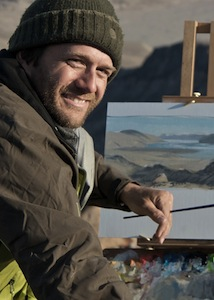
- Born: December 14, 1968; Windsor, Ontario
- Died: November 5, 2021 (aged 52)
- Occupation(s): Landscape painter and filmmaker

Cory Trépanier (December 14, 1968 - November 5, 2021) was a Canadian landscape painter and filmmaker, best known for his detailed oil paintings of the Canadian wilderness. He was also the creator of five films documenting his extensive painting journeys: A Painter's Odyssey, Into The Arctic, Into The Arctic II, TrueWild: Kluane and Into The Arctic: Awakening.

== Biography ==
He was born in Windsor, Ontario, but his family moved several times and he grew up in a variety of locations throughout Ontario and Quebec.

After graduating from Humberview Secondary School in Bolton, Ontario, Trépanier studied illustration at Sheridan College for four years. The ensuing decade saw Trépanier freelance as an illustrator, creating paintings for numerous advertising agencies, magazines and government organizations, including the National Capital Commission, the Ontario Ministry of Natural Resources, and the Toronto and Region Conservation Authority.

In 1997, Trépanier's career began to shift from commercial illustration to the pursuit of his fine art: painting the Canadian landscape in oils.

== Painting and television projects ==
In 2001, Trépanier launched his Coast To Canvas Project. Often accompanied by his wife, Janet, and two young daughters, Trépanier painted, filmed, canoed, hiked and camped for almost a month in each season along the coasts of Ontario's Lake Superior and Georgian Bay, a region then designated as the Heritage Coast. This led to the Coast To Canvas Exhibition Tour in 2004 consisting of over thirty oil paintings and a one-hour documentary called A Painter's Odyssey, Cory and Janet's first film.

In 2006, Trépanier launched Into The Arctic Project: An Artist's Journey to the North, a multi-year painting project that saw him undertake three extensive painting/filming expeditions to the Canadian Arctic. He developed an unprecedented collection of more than fifty original oil paintings of the Arctic, including a 15 foot wide by 5.5 foot high canvas called Great Glacier, which became one of the largest oil paintings ever from the Canadian Arctic.

In addition to sharing his experiences through online video journals, photography, writing, public speaking and the media, Trépanier also created three films from his Arctic project: Into The Arctic, Into The Arctic II and Into The Arctic: Awakening, which have been broadcast on numerous networks including CBC Documentary, HIFi, Bravo, Canal D, APTN, SCN, CLT and on selected networks internationally.

== Awards ==
In 2005, A Painter's Odyssey won the Best Environmental Documentary at the Waterwalker Film Festival.

In 2013, Trépanier's Into the Arctic II documentary was nominated for Best Performing Arts or Arts Documentary Program or Series at the 1st Canadian Screen Awards.

== Associations ==
In 2009, Trépanier became a Fellow of The Explorers Club.

In 2012, Trépanier became a Fellow of the Royal Canadian Geographical Society.
