= Robert McMichael =

Canadian collector, philanthropist, photographer (1921-2003)

Robert McMichel
- Born: Robert Alliston McMichael; 1921; Toronto, Ontario
- Died: 2003 (aged 81–82); Toronto, Ontario
- Known for: collector, philanthropist, photographer
- Spouse: Signe Kirsten Sorensen (m. 1949) (died July 4, 2007)

Robert Alliston McMichael CM O.Ont., D.Litt., LL. D (1921 – November 18, 2003) was a Canadian art collector and philanthropist. Together with his wife, he founded the McMichael Canadian Art Collection in Kleinburg.

== Career ==
McMichael was born in Toronto. He attended Humberside Collegiate Institute and while there, he worked on the school yearbook as a journalist, then as advertising manager. Afterwards, he wrote for neighborhood newspapers, then founded a newspaper for high-school students, then worked as a reporter for the Toronto Star, then for the T. Eaton Co. Ltd. in marketing.

In the Second World War, he served in the Royal Canadian Navy, afterwards becoming a photographer and opening the Robert McMichael Studios. In 1952, he developed the Travel Pak Ltd. besides other "Paks".

In 1954, inspired by Charles Band, McMichael and his wife Signe began collecting Canadian paintings by the Group of Seven and other Canadian artists, such as Tom Thomson.

In 1965, McMichael donated his collection and his house in Kleinburg, northwest of Toronto, with 14 acres of land to the Province of Ontario under the terms of a formal Agreement. The Agreement stated that the Government of Ontario would maintain the Collection and its special character in perpetuity and give the McMichaels lifelong membership on the Collection’s advisory committee, which controlled acquisitions. McMichael soon realized that he was losing control over the art acquisition process. In 1981 he resigned as director and after addressing the government through petitions and private representations, he sued the government in 1996 for breach of contract arguing that the Crown corporation, which managed the Collection, had reneged on the terms of the gift Agreement. The lawsuit culminated in a decision of the trial judge, Justice Peter Grossi of the Ontario Court’s General Division on November 15, 1996, in favour of the McMichaels. The decision, however, was appealed by the government in 1997.

As of 2009, the collection contained some 6,000 Canadian works.

McMichael died on November 18, 2003, of pneumonia following complications from a broken hip.
