= Jake Holden =

Canadian snowboarder (born 1987)

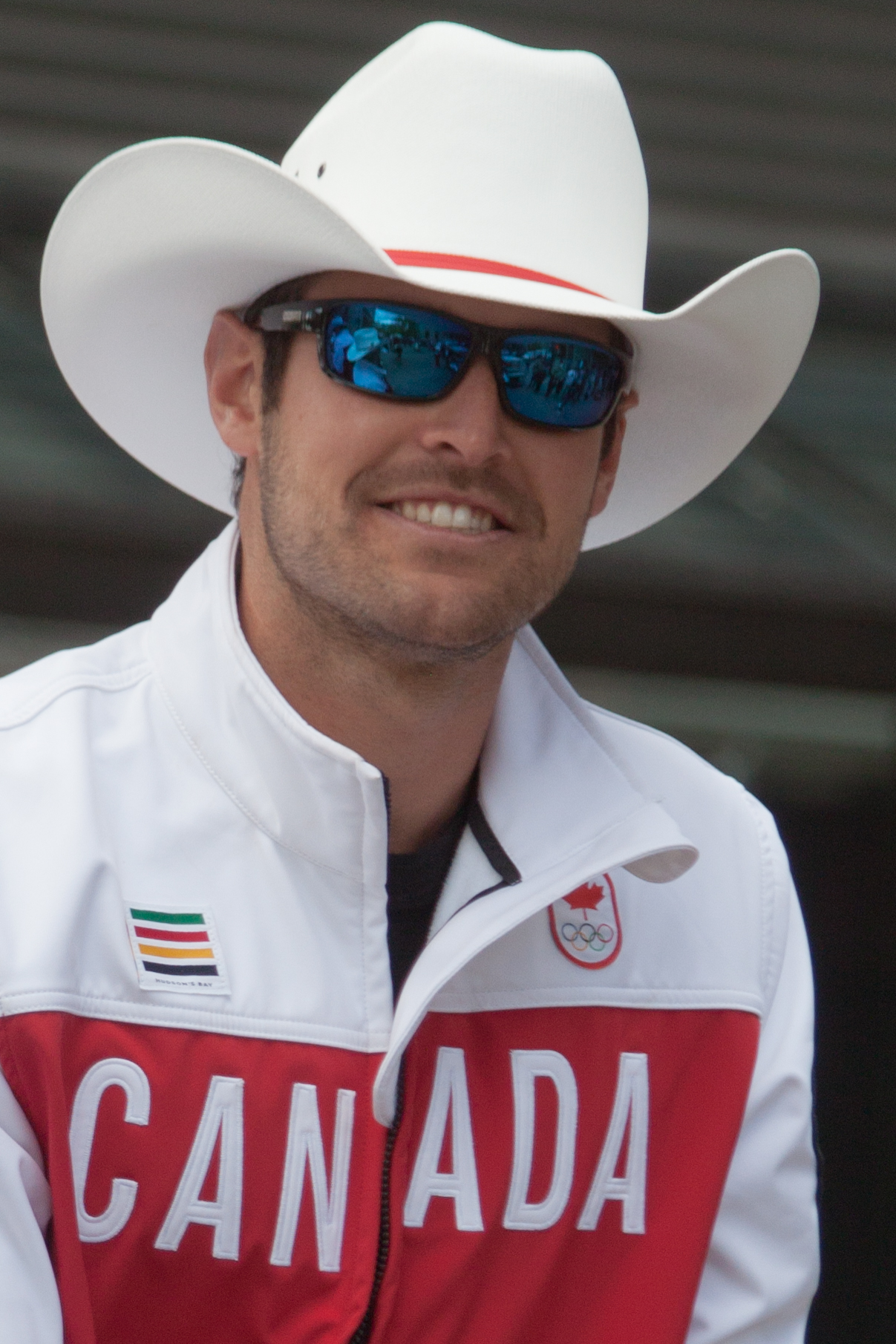
- Jake Holden (2014)

Personal information
- Nationality: Canadian
- Born: 25 September 1987 (age 38) Halton Hills, Ontario
- Height: 1.87 m (6 ft 2 in)
- Weight: 85 kg (187 lb)

Sport
- Country: Canada
- Sport: Snowboarding

Jake Holden (born September 25, 1987) is a Canadian snowboarder. He competed primarily in snowboard cross. Holden represented Canada in this event at the 2014 Winter Olympics in Sochi, placing fourth in his heat. Jake retired after the 2014 Olympics due to lingering injuries. In 2018 Jake was named assistant coach to the Canadian National Snowboardcross Team, he now shares head coaching duties with former 2010 Olympic gold medalist Maelle Ricker . In the off-season Jake runs his own business specializing in European stone work.
