= Malton, Mississauga =

Neighbourhood in Peel, Ontario, Canada also known as Mini India

Malton
- Neighbourhood
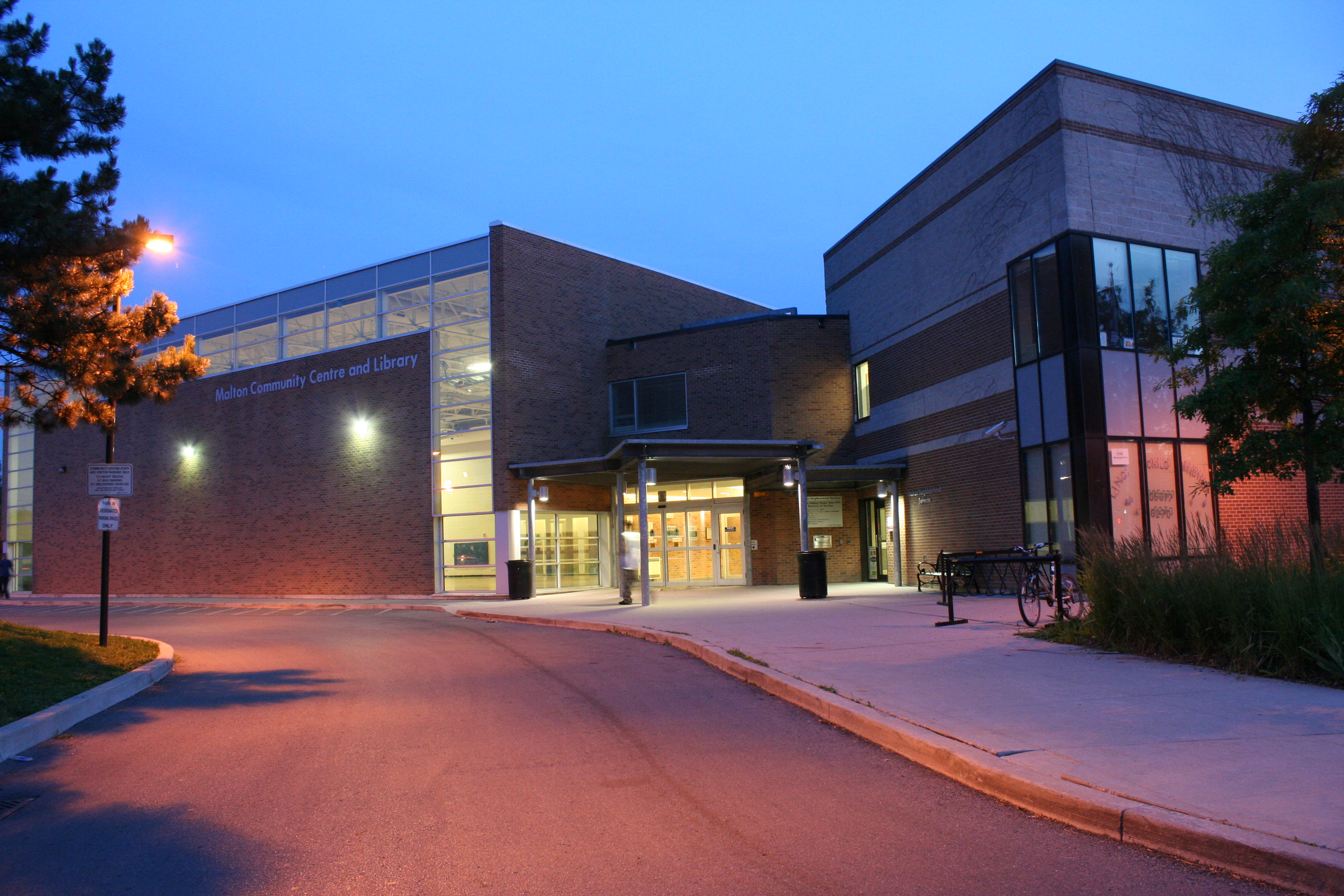
- Malton Community Centre and Library
- Motto: Home of the Avro Arrow
- Location of Malton in Mississauga Location of Malton in Southern Ontario
- Coordinates: 43°42′N 79°38′W
- Country: Canada
- Province: Ontario
- Regional municipality: Peel
- City: Mississauga
- Settled: 1819 or 1820
- Established: 1914 (Police village)
- Annexed: 1968 into Mississauga (as Town); 1974 (as City)
- Changed Division: 1974 into Peel Region from Peel County

Government
  - MP: Vacant (Mississauga—Malton)
  - MPP: Deepak Anand (Mississauga—Malton)
  - Councillors: Natalie Hart (Ward 5)

Population (2016)
  - Total: 38,470
- Postal code: L4T
- Demonym: Maltonian

Malton is a neighbourhood in the northeastern part of the city of Mississauga, Ontario, Canada, located to the northwest of Toronto.

Malton is bounded by Highway 427 to the east, the Brampton city limits (a Canadian National Railway (CN) rail line) to the north, roughly Airport Road to the west, and a second CN line and Toronto Pearson International Airport to the south. Malton is unique in that it does not adjoin any other Mississauga neighbourhood (though it does border Toronto's Rexdale neighbourhood east of the 427), being separated by the airport and extensive industrial areas. All of the roads in this area are named after cities in the United Kingdom. Mimico Creek flows through Malton. The oldest portion of Malton is located on the northwest corner of Airport and Derry Roads.

Together, the Malton and Britannia Woods areas compose Ward 5.

== History ==
=== 1820–1936 ===
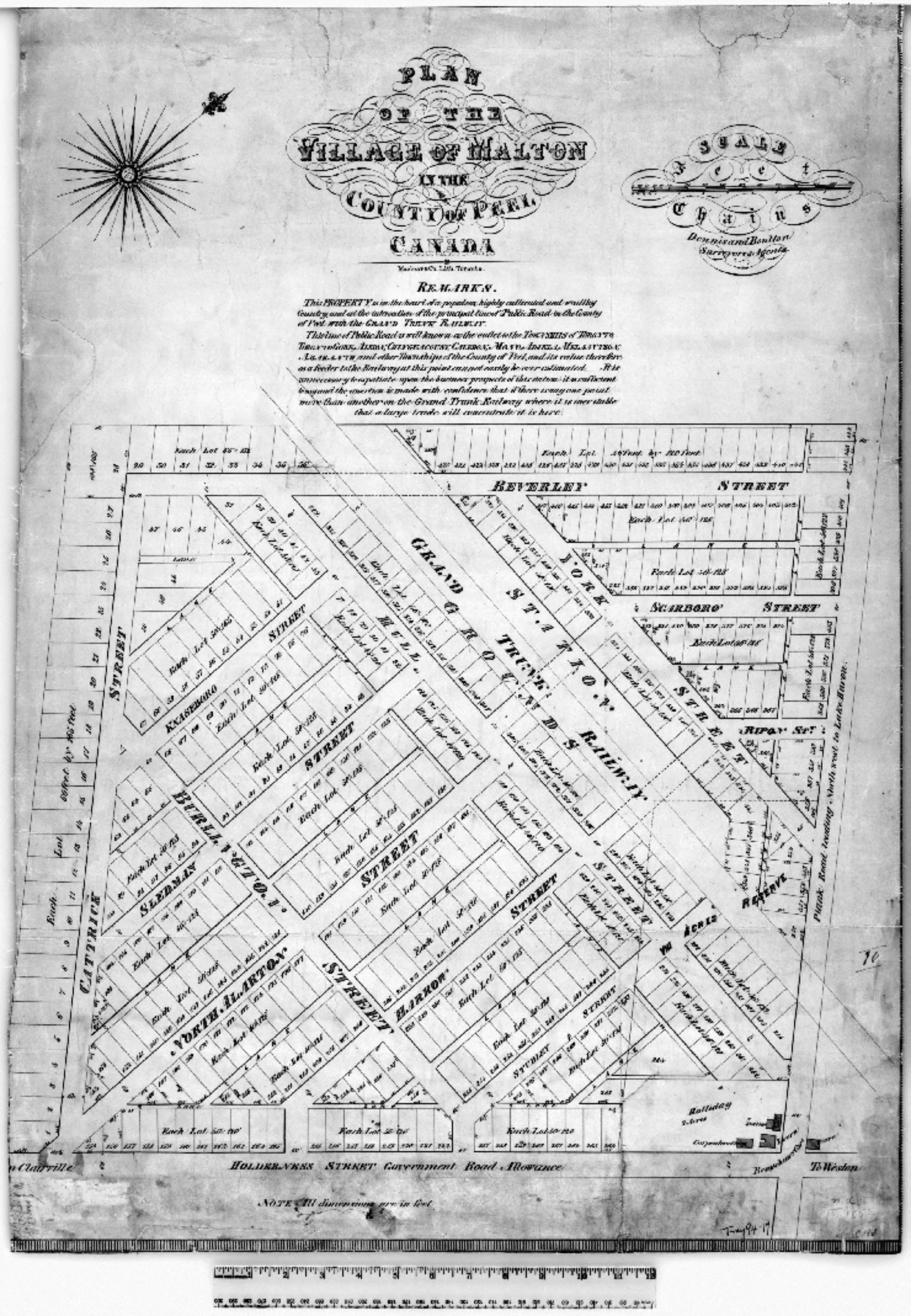
Plan of the Village of Malton of the County of Peel, 1877 Peel Atlas, Dennis and Boulton Surveying Agents

The Second Purchase from the Mississauga Indians in 1818, was for 648,000 acres. Toronto Township received 34,556 acres, increasing its total acreage to 64,125. The Toronto Township expansion included Malton Village.

The village of Malton took up the east half of Lot 11, Concession 6, East of Hurontario Street (EHS). This was the 100-acre land grant of Joseph Price that was designated in 1821. Most sources say Malton was first settled in 1819 or 1820.

The northeast corner of Toronto Township was first settled in 1820 by Richard Halliday. There is no Halliday listed in the Land Registry papers, so he probably was a squatter and then rented, or his purchase was not registered. Halliday was the local blacksmith and innkeeper, and he named the settlement Malton, after his home in England, Malton, North Yorkshire.

Another early settler was Joseph Tomlinson. His land petition was dated August 25, 1819. He and his wife Mary came to Malton in August 1820 to claim his 100-acre land grant; the east half of Lot 10, Conc. 7. Joseph built a cabin 16x20, cleared and fenced 5 acres, cleared the roadway in front of the property within 18 months to comply with the conditions of his land grant.

Other early settlers included:

- Samuel and Margaret Shaw 1821 200 acres S half Lot 10, W half of Lot 11 Con. 8
- Henry and Elizabeth Brocklebank 1821
- Samuel Moore 1822. Samuel Moore was the son of John Moore who on April 3, 1822, purchased Robert Chamber's 100-acre grant; the West half of Lot 11, Con. 6

In the 1840s, the Blanchard family cleared land northwest of the Four Corners and the area became the Village of Malton.

In 1850, when Toronto Township was incorporated, Malton had a population of 350. The introduction of the Grand Trunk Railway in 1854, allowed better access to Toronto markets for local farmers and Malton thrived as a result. The village of Malton was subdivided in 1855. The population was 600 in 1864. Malton was chosen as the county seat in 1867, but Brampton contested the decision and was awarded the county seat a year later. Its economic prosperity declined, as did the population, to 200. The opportunity for advancement was dealt another blow when the Credit Valley Railway came to Dixie, Streetsville, Meadowvale and Churchville in 1879. Malton suffered with the drop in shipping business.

Malton was organized as a police village in 1914.

=== 1937–1945 ===
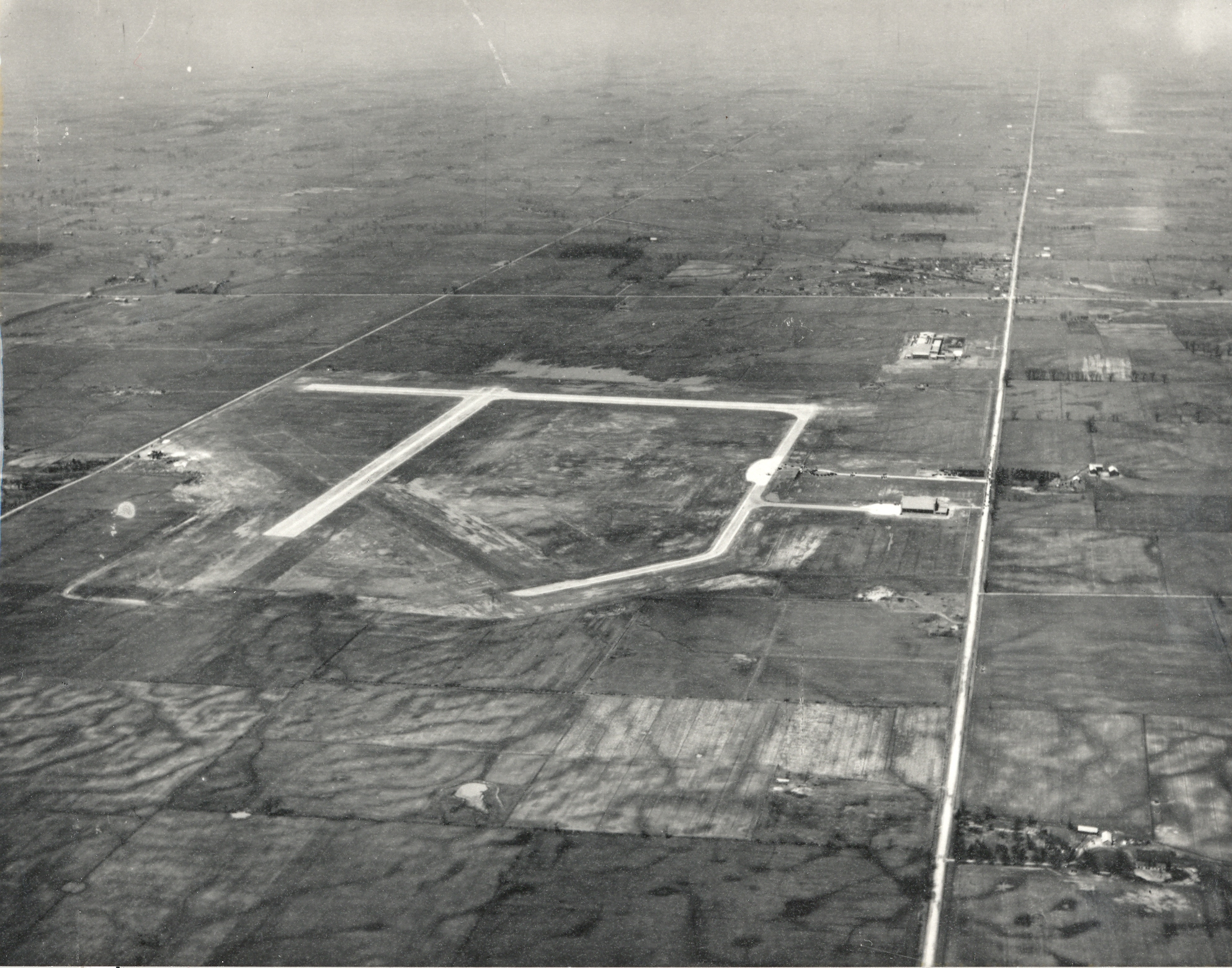
Looking north toward Malton Airport, circa 1938, with Sixth Line (present Airport Road), on the right. National Steel Car and the Village of Malton can be seen at top-right.

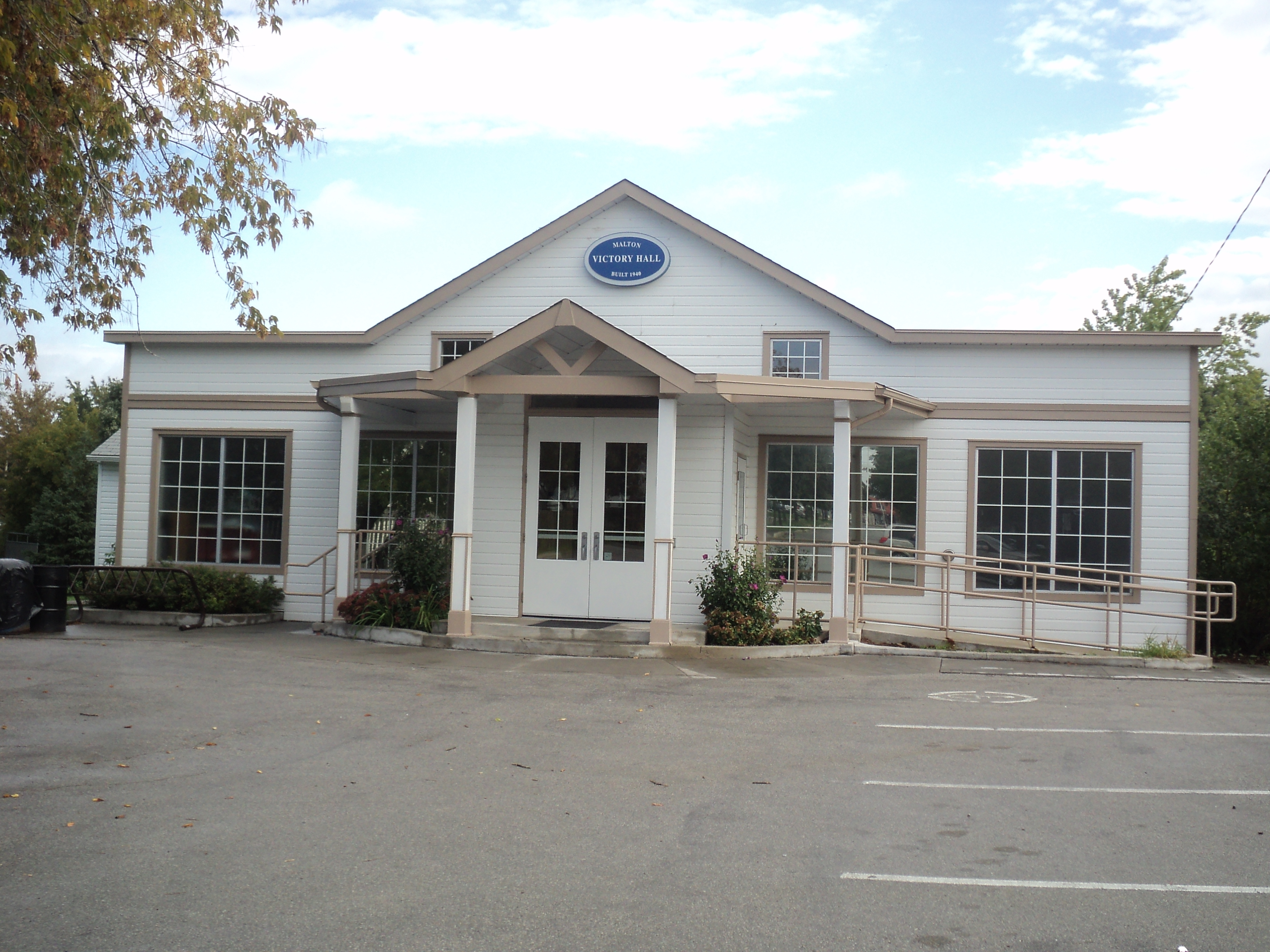
Victory Hall, renovated in 2010

==== Airport ====
In 1937, Malton experienced a major shift from agricultural to an industrial economy when 13 farms were selected to become the location of a 'million dollar, world class airport', which would eventually become Toronto Pearson International Airport, and location for a new Aircraft manufacturing Industry.

That year, Land agents representing the Toronto Harbour Commission approached farmers south of Malton to acquire land for the airport, which was named Malton Airport.

A farmhouse was the first airport terminal (1937). In 1939, a new terminal building that was identical to the one built at Toronto City Centre Airport, replaced the farmhouse as the airport terminal.

Malton Airport was also the site of the British Commonwealth Air Training Plan facilities during the war-time years.

==== Aircraft industry ====
National Steel Car built a manufacturing plant in 1938. It produced Westland Lysanders and was subcontractor for production of other aircraft. On November 4, 1942, the Federal government expropriated National Steel Car and set up the crown corporation called Victory Aircraft. Victory Aircraft produced Avro Lancaster bombers from 1942 to 1945.

==== Victory Village ====
In 1942, the Canadian Government expropriated the north part of the former Fred Codlin farm and built 200 military-style houses for war-time workers. "Victory Village" streets had war-time references; Victory, McNaughton (Andrew McNaughton, commander of the Canadian Forces in the UK), Churchill and Lancaster (Avro Lancasters were built at Victory Aircraft from 1943 to 1945). Victory Community Hall was built shortly after (at Victory Park) and was renovated in 2010.

=== 1945–1969 ===
Originally a police village nestled within the boundary between Toronto Gore and Toronto Townships around the intersection of present Airport and Derry Roads, Malton became part of Toronto Township in 1952, upon the annexation of the part of Toronto Gore south of Steeles Avenue. Toronto Township was restructured into the Town of Mississauga in 1968, which became a city in 1974.

==== Airport ====
The Trans-Canada Airport terminal replaced the second terminal in 1949. In 1960, the airport was renamed Toronto International Airport. The Trans-Canada Terminal was replaced by the Aeroquay Terminal in 1964.

==== Aircraft industry ====
A.V. Roe Canada Limited was established on December 1, 1945, and assumed control of Victory Aircraft. In 1946, A.V. Roe acquired Turbo Research Limited, which was later renamed Orenda Engines. On August 10, 1949, the Avro Jetliner made its first flight. On January 19, 1950, the CF-100 Jet Interceptor/Fighter made its maiden flight.

By 1958, Malton acquired an international reputation as a leader in aeronautical design and manufacturing. Malton was the home of the famous Avro Arrow, Canada's first supersonic aircraft. Debate on whether the program was ahead of its time or superseded remains a debate to present day. On February 20, 1959, Prime Minister John Diefenbaker terminated the project and the five completed Arrows were dismantled. After the cancellation of the Avro Arrow program in 1959, the plant was operated by de Havilland Canada (1962), Douglas Aircraft (1965) McDonnell Douglas Canada (1981), and Boeing Canada (1997) before being demolished in 2005.

==== Housing ====
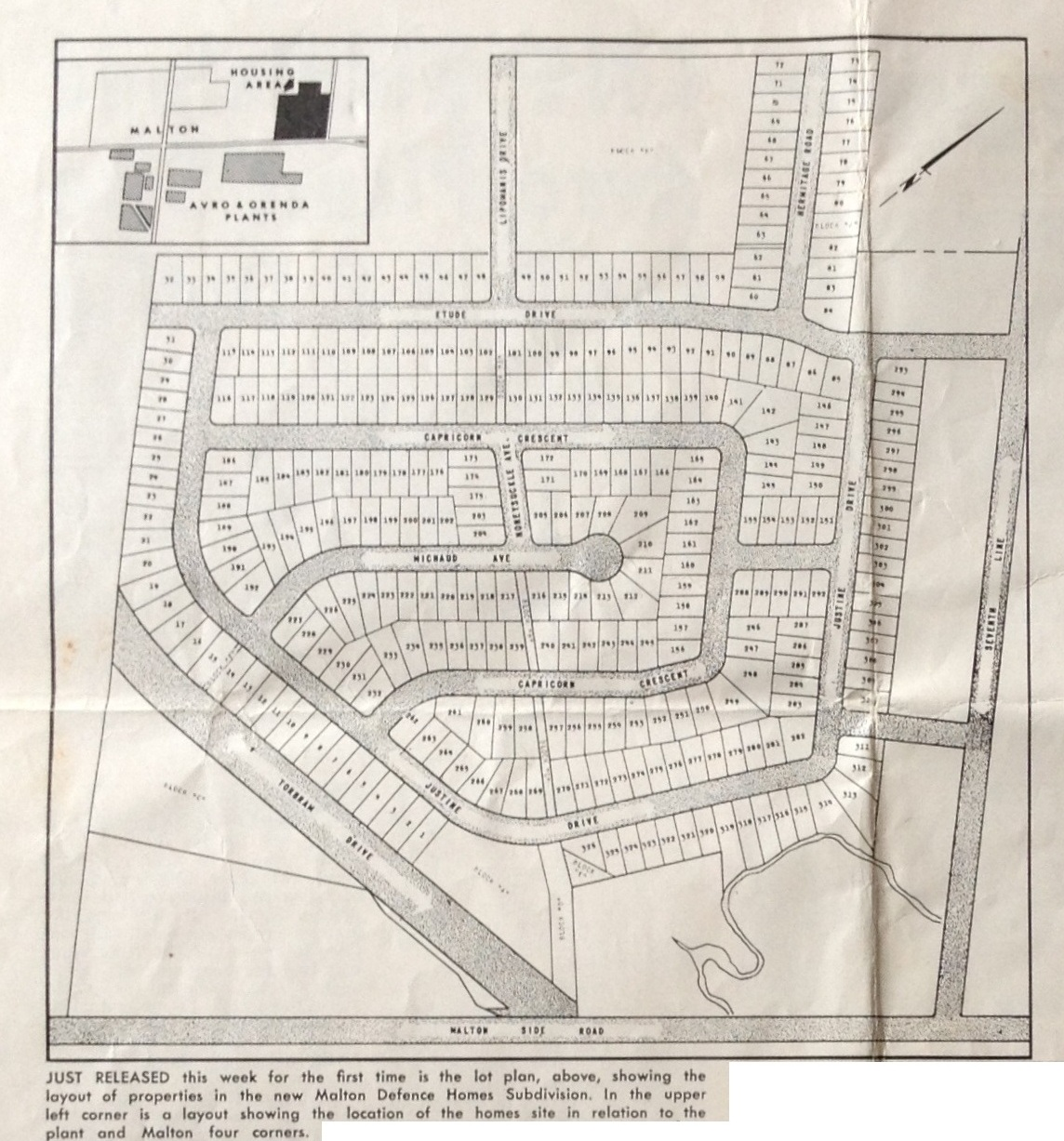
Plan of the Ridgewood subdivision from Avro News 1957-05-31

The Ridgewood subdivision was built in the mid-1950s. Ridgewood (Justine Drive, Capricorn Crescent, Michaud Avenue, Honeysuckle Avenue, Sonja Road, Minotola Avenue, Etude Drive, Lipomanis Drive (Cambrett) and Hermitage Road) was originally called "Malton Defence Homes Subdivision".

Marvin Heights subdivision was built in the late 1950s (Redstone Road, Homeside Gardens, Bonaventure Drive and Chinook Drive).

The Westwood subdivision was started in the mid-1960s (Morning Star Drive, Darcel Avenue, Dunrankin Drive). Laddie Crescent was established in 1967. Darla Drive, Discus Crescent, Lockington Crescent, Monica Drive, and Rockhill Road are listed on the 1968 Voter list 16242. Wrenwood Crescent and Yuma on 16243. Corliss Crescent, Darcel Avenue, Wyewood Road, Custer Crescent, Meyer Drive, Morningstar Drive, Bayswater Crescent, Madiera Road, Magic Court, Harwick Drive, Topping Road, Wainbrook Road, Dellaport Drive, Woodruff Crescent and Crabtree Crescent also appear on the 1968 Voter lists.

==== Gas explosion ====
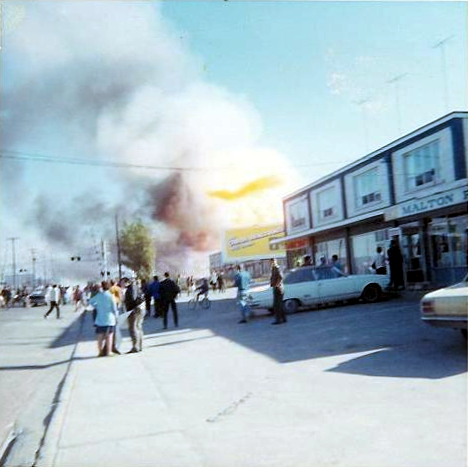
Looking South on Airport Road in front of Malton Medical Centre on Saturday afternoon, October 25, 1969

On Saturday, October 25, 1969, at 2:55 PM a natural gas line leak caused an explosion and fire at the "Four Corners" (the intersection of Airport and Derry Road) of Malton. The "blowtorch" flame was 150 feet (46 m) high and the heat was estimated to be 1,500 °F (820 °C). Consumer's Gas finally shut the gas off about 4 hours later.

The Avronian Restaurant, Langford's Variety, Malton Hardware and Baker's Lumber were blown apart. The fire consumed Pat's Steak on a Bun and Sit n' Eat restaurants and damaged the Bank of Nova Scotia, Malton Fruit Market (Longo's), Abell's Drug Store and Shirley's Pool Hall.

75-year-old Jean Perigo was killed instantly and 20 other people were injured. Two houses, 17 businesses and 49 cars were destroyed. 18 families who live in apartments above the stores were homeless. Over 350 families were evacuated. The total damage was estimated to be $1.5 million. Reconstruction took place over a 10-year period at a cost of $6.5 million. Some businesses reopened and others closed permanently. The "Four Corners" of Malton never regained its former vitality.

=== 1969–present ===
==== Aircraft industry ====
The office and manufacturing plant facilities, on the Southwest corner of Airport and Derry Road, that was built by National Steel Car (1938–1942), and subsequently used by Victory Aircraft (1942–1945), A.V. Roe Canada (1945), de Havilland Canada (1962), Douglas Aircraft (1965), McDonnell Douglas Canada (1981), and Boeing Canada (1997) was demolished in 2005.

Orenda Aerospace Division, Magellan Aerospace Corporation continues to operate at 3160 Derry Road east.

Mitsubishi Heavy Industries Canada Aerospace (MHICA) celebrated their 10-year anniversary in May, 2016. MHICA is a recognized North American Tier 1 heavy aerostructure manufacturer.

==== Airport and transportation ====
In 1972, Terminal 2 opened to supplement the Aeroquay terminal (Terminal 1). The airport was given its present name of Toronto Pearson International Airport in 1984. In 1991, Terminal 3 opened. Terminals 1 and 2 were both closed in the 2000s when the present Terminal 1 was completed.

In addition to the airport, Malton has great importance as a transportation link between Toronto and its suburbs to the west, particularly Brampton and the other parts of Mississauga. The neighbourhood borders Brampton, Vaughan and Etobicoke. As such, it is very strategically placed and important to the flow of people and goods throughout the Greater Toronto Area.

==== Police ====
Law enforcement in Malton is provided by the Peel Regional Police. There is a police buildings in the local mall.

== Demographics ==
One of the busiest intersections in Malton. Facing northwest, the apartment building at 3425 Morningstar Drive can be seen.

The post-war period saw waves of Italian and Polish immigrants settle in Malton, while the 1970s and 1980s saw this shift to the South Asian, West African, and Caribbean population, who continue to make up the predominant demographic in Malton today. Malton's proximity to Pearson International Airport, originally Malton Airport, is often cited as part of the reason it has become a popular initial place of settlement for immigrants, contributing to the tremendous population growth that has occurred from the 1950s onward.

== Sports ==
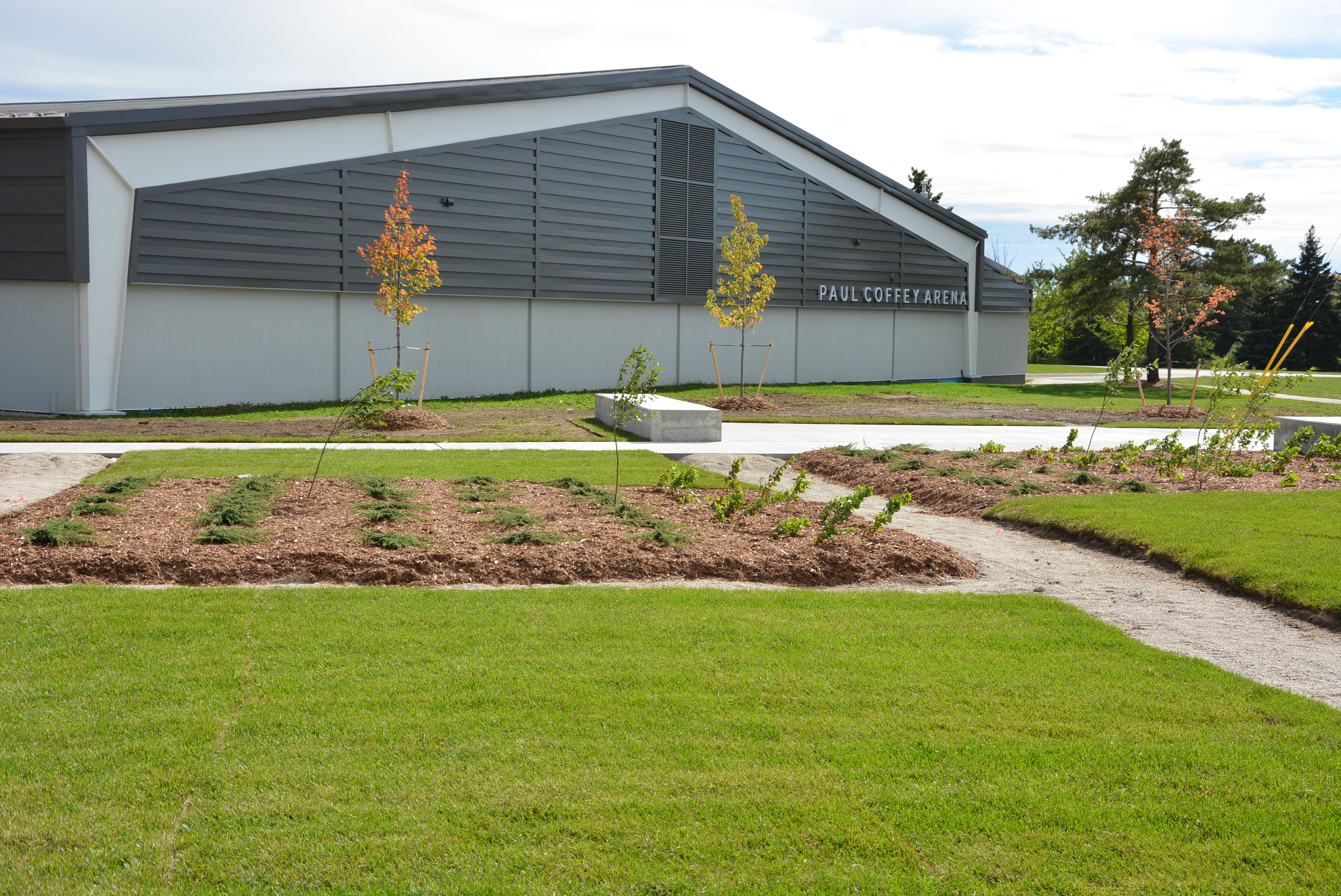
Paul Coffey Arena

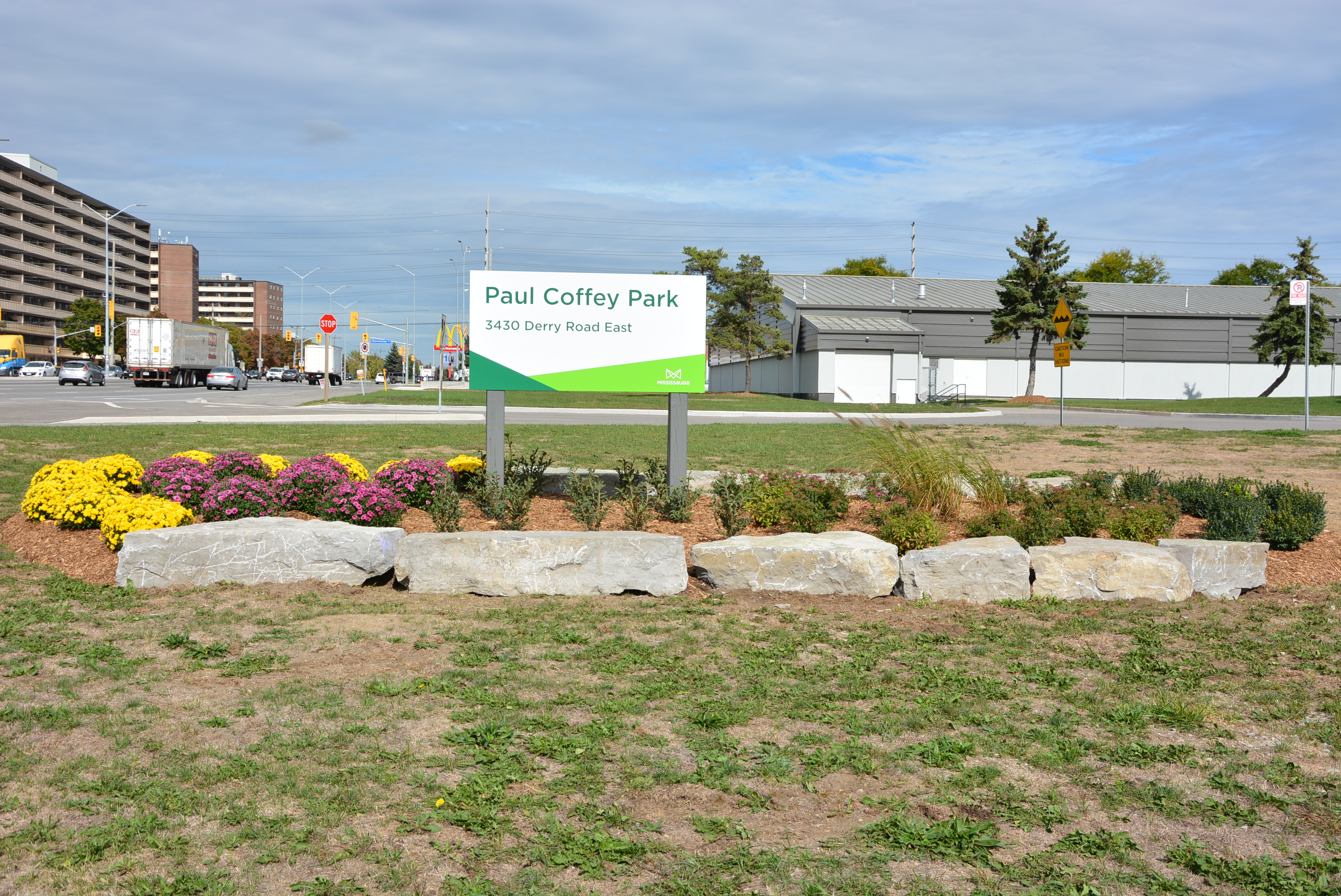
Paul Coffey Park sign

=== Hockey ===
The Malton Minor Hockey Association MMHA was founded in 1949. Malton Arena was built in 1968. The arena was renamed Paul Coffey Arena on September 23, 2016. The MMHA became defunct in 2005.

=== Lacrosse ===
Malton Renegades ran a very successful minor lacrosse program however it also folded in 1982 when they joined with Erindale, Cawthra to form Mississauga Minor lacrosse. Clarkson, the last remaining separate minor club within the City limits would also join in the late 1980s. A Jr "C" team also played out of the Malton Arena for a number of years.

== Education ==
=== Public schools ===
Malton is served by the Peel District School Board, which operates secular English-language public schools. The Conseil scolaire Viamonde operates regional French-language secular public schools.

==== Elementary and middle schools ====
- Brandon Gate Public School
- Corliss Public School
- Darcel Avenue Senior Public School (formerly Darcel Senior Public School)
- Dunrankin Drive Public School (formerly Westwood Public School)
- Lancaster Public School (formerly Lancaster Senior Public School)
- Marvin Heights Public School
- Morning Star Middle School (formerly Morning Star Secondary School)
- Ridgewood Public School

==== Secondary school ====
- Lincoln M. Alexander Secondary School (formerly Westwood Secondary School), located across the road from Malton's branch of the Mississauga Library system, near Westwood Mall and the adjacent bus terminal

=== Catholic schools ===
Malton's Catholic community is served by the Dufferin-Peel Catholic School Board, which operates English-language Catholic schools. The Conseil scolaire de district catholique Centre-Sud operates regional French-language Catholic schools.

- Ascension of Our Lord Secondary School was originally built as a Junior High, but is now Malton's only Catholic high school. Formerly there were also several primary schools, of which two are left.
- Holy Cross Separate School is located next to Our Lady of The Airways Catholic Church. When St. Gabriel was closed in 2004, the remaining students were incorporated into Holy Cross and the school was reopened as an Adult Learning Centre.
- St. Raphael Elementary School is located at the north end of Woodgreen Park. Students from St. Michael (closed in 2003) and Our Lady of the Airways (closed in 2004) were transferred to St. Raphael's. The St. Michael's building was torn down, and Our Lady of the Airways was demolished in 2009.

== Development ==
As of 2010, a new bus terminal was built on the corner of Morning Star Dr. and Goreway Dr. An overbridge at railway crossing on Torbram Drive has been started and will soon begin construction. Malton Route 107 travel times have been reduced since the completion of the Mississauga Bus Rapid Transit (BRT) transitway.

There is one new pools at the community centre, there used to be one in the high school but as of 2022 it is being turned into a new youth hub, (Malton Youth Hub). There are two new ambulance stations on either side of Malton and one new fire hall.

== Notable people ==
- Charles Allen, Olympic hurdler.
- Greg Anaka, recipient of the Order of Canada in 1974; president of Malton Memorial Recreation Association.
- Carlton Chambers, Olympic gold medalist.
- Paul Coffey, NHL defenceman and member of Hockey Hall of Fame.
- Devon, winner of the 1993 Juno award for Best Rap Recording.
- Richard Dos Ramos, jockey; grew up in Malton.
- Gerry Gray, World Cup and Canadian Soccer Hall of Fame player
- Sherman Hamilton, former NCAA and Canadian National Basketball Team player.
- Sunny Malton, Punjabi-Canadian rapper and co-owner of the music label 'Brown Boyz'.
- Teddy Morris, Canadian Football Hall of Fame player and coach for the Toronto Argonauts; retired to his farm in Malton.
- Michael Peca, former captain of the Buffalo Sabres of the NHL.
- Chris Rudge, chief executive officer of the Canadian Olympic Committee (COC) 2003–2010, chairman and CEO 100th Grey Cup Festival (2012), executive chairman & CEO of Toronto Argonauts Football Club.
- Paul Stalteri, professional soccer player with the Tottenham Hotspur in the English Premiership. Played for the Malton Bullets.
- George Stroumboulopoulos, host of CBC Television's The Hour.
