= Wilmot Wild =

- Sport: Box lacrosse
- Founded: 2011
- League: Ontario Junior C Lacrosse League
- Based in: Baden, Ontario
- Arena: Wilmot Recreation Complex
- Colours: Blue, Black and White
- President: Jeff Snyder
- Head coach: Jeff Snyder
- General manager: Ryan Fitton

The Wilmot Wild are a Canadian junior box lacrosse team from Baden, Ontario, Canada within Township of Wilmot. The Wild play in the Ontario Junior C Lacrosse League within the Ontario Lacrosse Association. Their home arena is the Wilmot Recreation Complex.

== History ==
Formed in 2011, the Wilmot Wild debut season in the OJCLL was a success - qualifying for the West Division finals. After a lackluster regular season at 4–11–1, the fifth place Wild stormed through the playoffs sweeping the Hamilton Bengals in two straight games before eliminating division winner Caledon Bandits three games-to-one to advance to the division finals. The Wild playoff run would end in four games to the Halton Hills Bulldogs, but made their mark as a team to be reckoned with.

In 2012 the Wild's regular season record (6–8–2) improved, but their playoff fate would not. The Wild would lose in the first round and it was decided that a coaching change was needed.

2013 would see the introduction of the new coaching staff led by veteran Greg Hummel. As a player and coach Hummel boasts two Presidents Cup national titles at the Senior B level with the Kitchener-Waterloo Kodiaks. Hummel would bring in Jamie Diebolt and Kevin Miller and the success on the floor was immediate. The Wild jumped out to an 8–1 start in the regular season and looked to be on cruise control until seven straight losses put them into the playoffs with an 8–8 record. Wilmot would sweep the Fergus Thistles before losing in the semi-finals.

In their fourth season the Wild saw Diebolt take on the GM role and again the regular season record improved. The Wild would claim top spot in the West with a 12–4 record and would defeat the Hamilton Bengals in two straight games to head to the semi-finals again. The Wild would not succeed in surpassing their best finish and would fall short just prior to the big show.

2015 would prove to be a wild and crazy one finishing the season with a 14–2 regular season record. A league ruling however would see those two defeats overturned in the Wild's favour and finish them with a 16–0 record. Wilmot would sweep the two-game opening round series against the Mimico Mountaineers before facing the seventh seeded Six Nations Warriors. The Warriors, despite going 16–0 on the floor were seeded seventh after forfeiting 13 of those victories. Six Nations eliminated the Wild in three-straight games.

The 2016 season would prove to be the finest in Wild franchise history to date as the Wild would finish tied for top spot in the West with a sparkling 14–2 record in the regular season. With Diebolt now taking on the role as Head Coach/GM, he would lead the Wild to an impressive 8–1 record in the West playoffs en route to their first Meredith Cup appearance. In spite of some stellar individual performances the Wild were no match for the Clarington Shamrox who swept the Wild 4–0 to take their fourth Meredith Cup title.

In 2017, the Wild were looking to build on their success from 2016 and with many returning veterans felt they had the team to go back to the Cup. Wilmot would finish the regular season with an 11–5 record. After sweeping the Mimico Mountaineers in the first round Wilmot find themselves being swept by the Fergus Thistles in the Western semifinals.

Personnel changes were made ahead of the 2018 campaign as Kitchener-Waterloo native Rick Windl would take over the helm as head coach and Ryan Fitton as GM. The Wild would finish the regular season in first place with a 13–3 record and went on to sweep the Caldeon Bandits in round one and Fergus Thistles in round two. Wilmot would meet Six Nations in the division finals winning in four games to earn their second trip to the Meredith Cup finals.

Jeff Snyder replaced original team president Wayne Paddick in the fall of 2020.

== Season-by-season results ==
Note: GP = Games played, W = Wins, L = Losses, T = Ties, Pts = Points, GF = Goals for, GA = Goals against

| Season | GP | W | L | T | PTS | GF | GA | Result | Playoffs |
|---|---|---|---|---|---|---|---|---|---|
| 2011 | 16 | 4 | 11 | 1 | 9 | 111 | 128 | 5th of 6, West 14th of 18, OJCLL | Won West quarterfinals, 2-0 (Hamilton); Won West semifinals, 3-1 (Caledon); Lost West Finals, 1-3 (Halton Hills) |
| 2012 | 16 | 6 | 8 | 2 | 14 | 95 | 92 | 5th of 6, West 10th of 16, OJCLL | Lost West quarterfinals, 0-2 (Halton Hills) |
| 2013 | 16 | 8 | 8 | 0 | 16 | 96 | 81 | 4th of 9, West 7th of 16, OJCLL | Won West quarterfinals, 3-0 (Fergus); Lost West semifinals, 0-3 (Halton Hills) |
| 2014 | 16 | 12 | 4 | 0 | 24 | 145 | 108 | 1st of 9, West 4th of 17, OJCLL | Won West quarterfinals, 2-0 (Hamilton); Lost West semifinals, 1-3 (Halton Hills) |
| 2015 | 16 | 16 | 0 | 0 | 32 | 193 | 97 | 1st of 8, West 1st of 15, OJCLL | Won West quarterfinals, 2-0 (Mimico); Lost West semifinals, 3-0 (Six Nations) |
| 2016 | 16 | 14 | 2 | 0 | 28 | 218 | 120 | 2nd of 9, West 3rd of 16, OJCLL | Won West quarterfinals, 2-0 (Mimico); Won West semifinals, 3-1 (Six Nations); Won West Finals, 3-0 (Fergus); Lost Meredith Cup Finals, 4-0 (Clarington) |
| 2017 | 16 | 11 | 5 | 0 | 22 | 179 | 129 | 3rd of 8, West 4th of 15, OJCLL | Won West quarterfinals, 2-0 (Mimico); Lost West semifinals, 3-0 (Fergus) |
| 2018 | 16 | 13 | 3 | 0 | 26 | 194 | 101 | 1st of 8, West 3rd of 17, OJCLL | Won West quarterfinals, 2-0 (Caledon); Won West semifinals, 3-0 (Fergus); Won West Finals, 3-1 (Six Nations); Lost Meredith Cup Finals, 4-1 (Peterborough) |
| 2019 | 16 | 12 | 4 | 0 | 24 | 159 | 124 | 2nd of 7, West 4th of 15, OJCLL | Lost West semifinals, 2-3 (Fergus) |
