= Senior Series Lacrosse =

- Sport: Box lacrosse
- Founded: 2019
- No. of teams: 11
- Country: Canada
- Most recent champion: Centre Wellington Aces (2026)
- Most titles: Six Nations Tomahawks (2)
- Website: https://www.htosports.com/teams/?u=SENIORSERIESLACROSSE&s=lacrosse

Senior Series Lacrosse is a Senior C box lacrosse league based out of Ontario, Canada sanctioned by the Ontario Lacrosse Association. SSL teams compete for the Nobile Cup (named after league founder Shelly Nobile) league championship.

== History ==
Formed in 2019, Senior Series Lacrosse was formed to fill a void between Senior B (full-contact, very competitive) and Masters (non-contact) box lacrosse. Senior Series Lacrosse offers players an opportunity to continue playing competitive full-contact lacrosse after Junior without the time commitment of Senior A or B levels. SSL play modified CLA rules with games taking place at a single site over a weekend. Playing multiple games on the same day, teams play two 20-minute halves instead of three periods.

Five teams (Huntsville Hawks, Lakefield Rage, London Blue Devils, Peel Region Tigers, Six Nations Tomahawks) competed in the inaugural season playing 14 games over four weekends. Teams are seeded with the four top teams advancing to the league playoffs.

The league expanded to seven in 2020 with the addition of North Bay Titans and Toronto Lightning. Prior to the 2022 season Khaos Lacrosse Club and Wellington Aces were added to the circuit. The Aces would rename Centre Wellington for 2024.

New in 2024 were the Barrie Bearcats and Georgetown Gators. Guelph Regals and Tyendinaga Wolfpack were added for the 2025 season.

== Teams ==
Senior Series Lacrosse
Team	City	Joined
Barrie Bearcats	Barrie	2024
Centre Wellington Aces	Centre Wellington	2022
Georgetown Gators	Georgetown	2024
Guelph Regals	Guelph	2025
Huntsville Hawks	Huntsville	2019
Khaos Lacrosse Club	Cambridge	2022
Lakefield Rage	Lakefield	2019
London Timber Kings	London	2019
Six Nations Tomahawks	Hagerville	2019
Toronto Lightning	Toronto	2020
Tyendinaga Wolfpack	Tyendinaga	2025

=== Former teams ===
North Bay Titans (2020)

Peel Region Tigers/Schooners Lacrosse Club (2019-2024)

== Champions ==
Legends Cup winners
Season	Champion	Runner up	Result	MVP
2019	Six Nations Tomahawks	Lakefield Rage	10-0	Alex Kedoh Hill (Six Nations Tomahawks)
2020	Season cancelled due to COVID-19			
2021	Lakefield Rage	Huntsville Hawks	8-4	Aaron Woods (Lakefield Rage)
2022	Khaos Lacrosse Club	Lakefield Rage	5-1	Tyrus Rehanek (Khaos Lacrosse Club)
2023	Six Nations Tomahawks	Wellington Aces	7-2	Kyle Childerhose (London Timberkings)
2024	London TimberKings	Georgetown Gators		Nathan Joyes (Khaos Lacrosse Club)
2025	Georgetown Gators	Centre Wellington Aces	6-2	John Parry-Smith (Khaos Lacrosse Club)
2026	Centre Wellington Aces	Georgetown Aces	7-3	Jared Bettonvil (Guelph Regals)
