= Malton Minor Hockey Association =

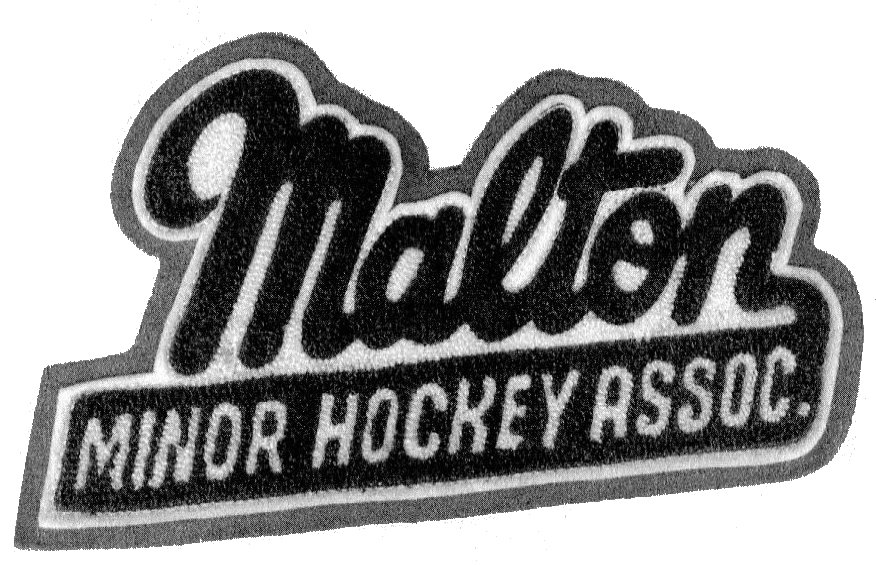

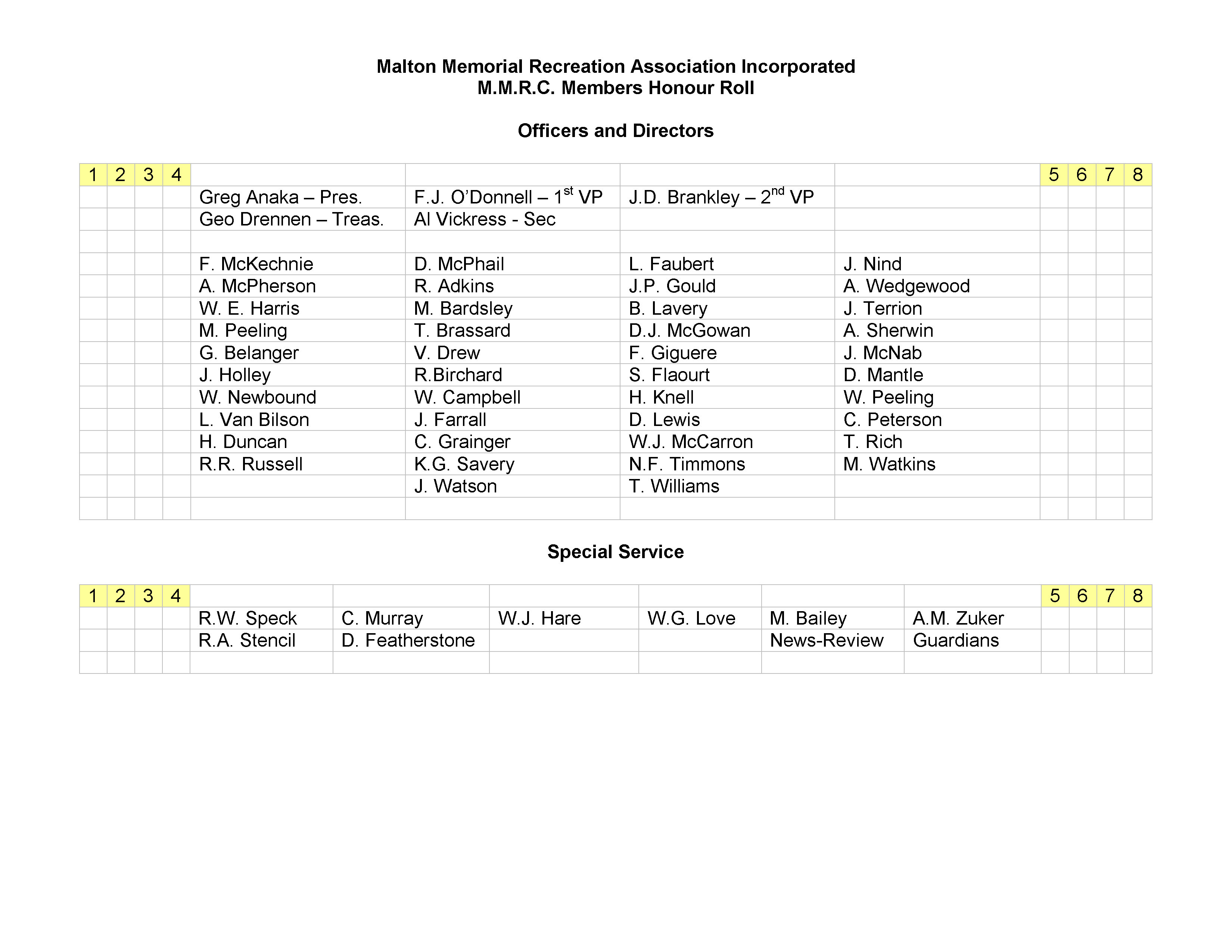

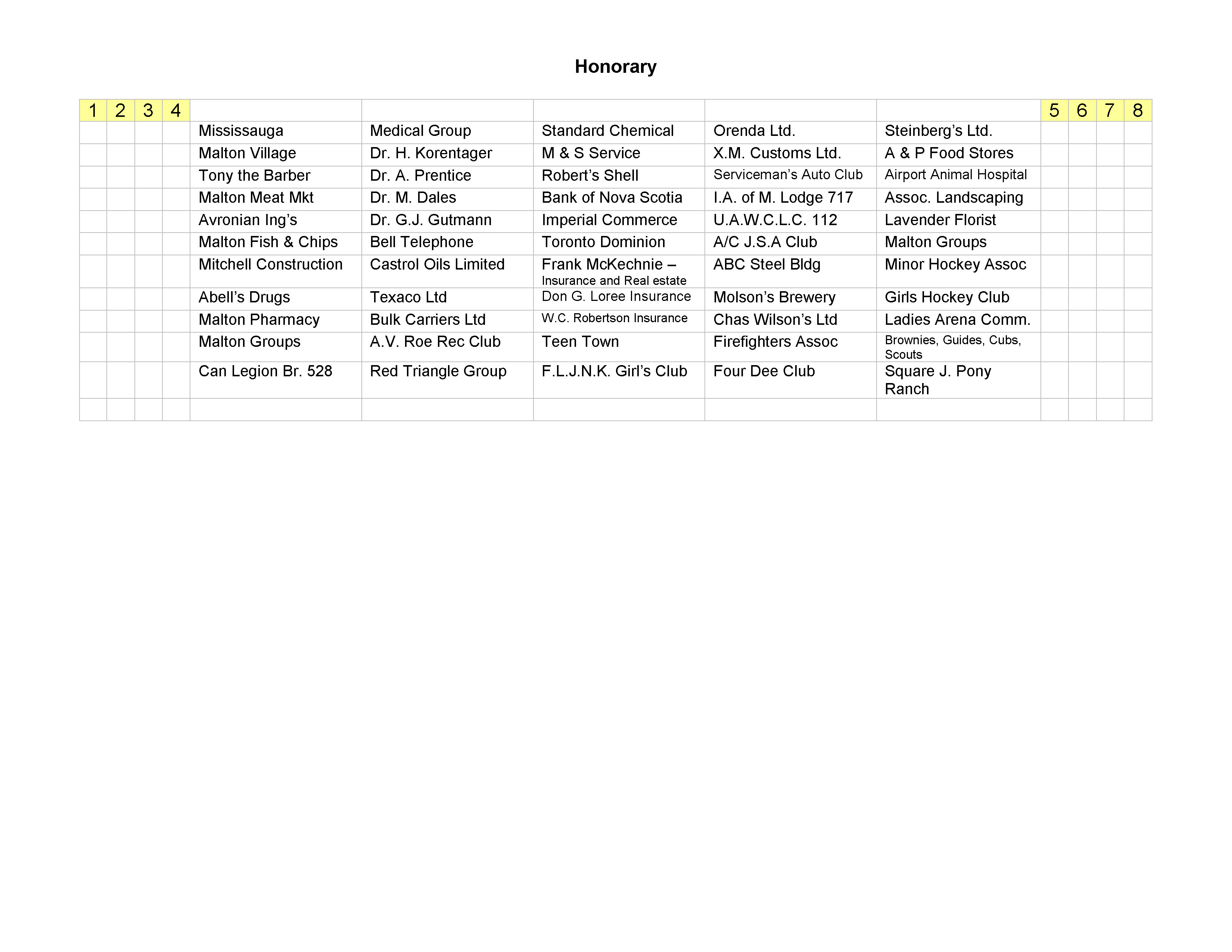

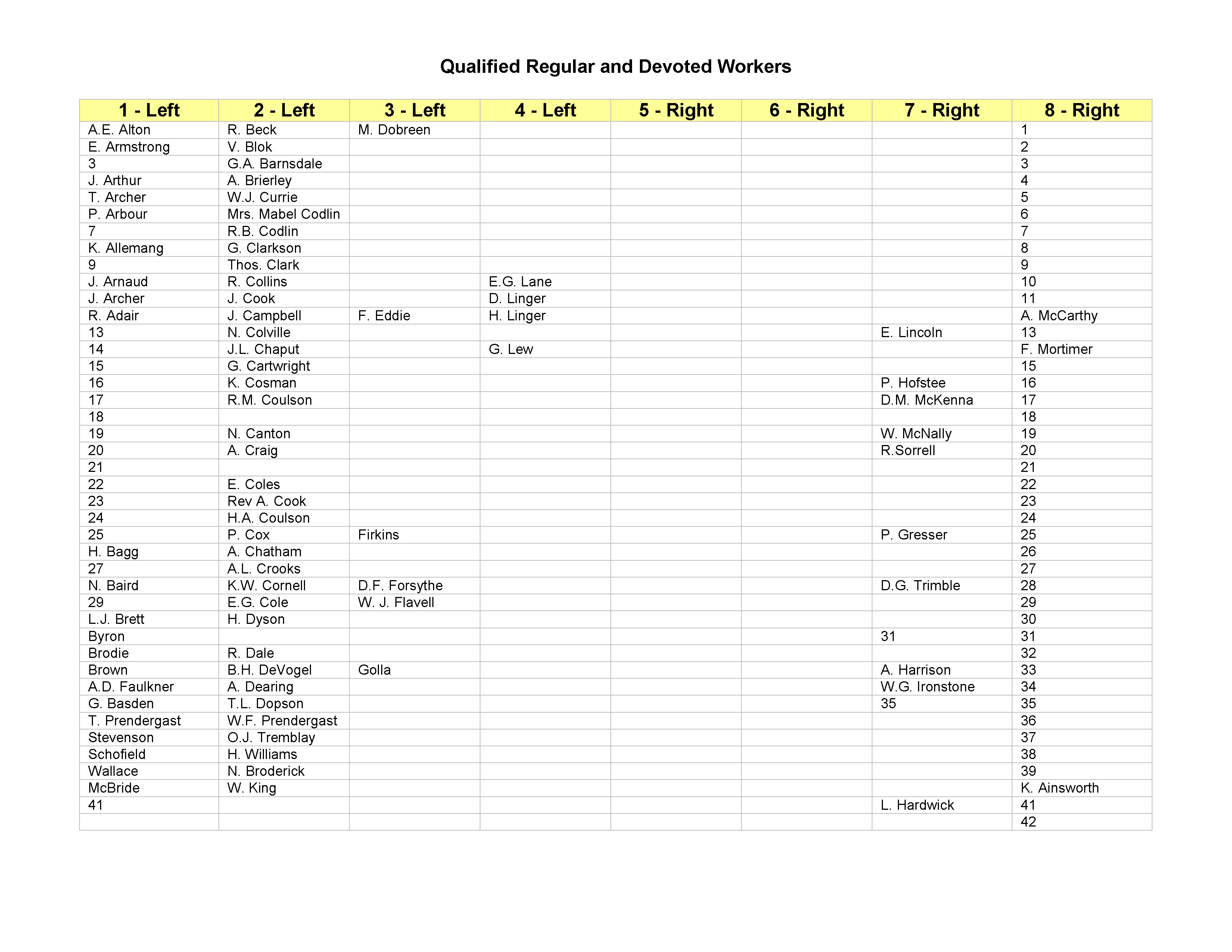

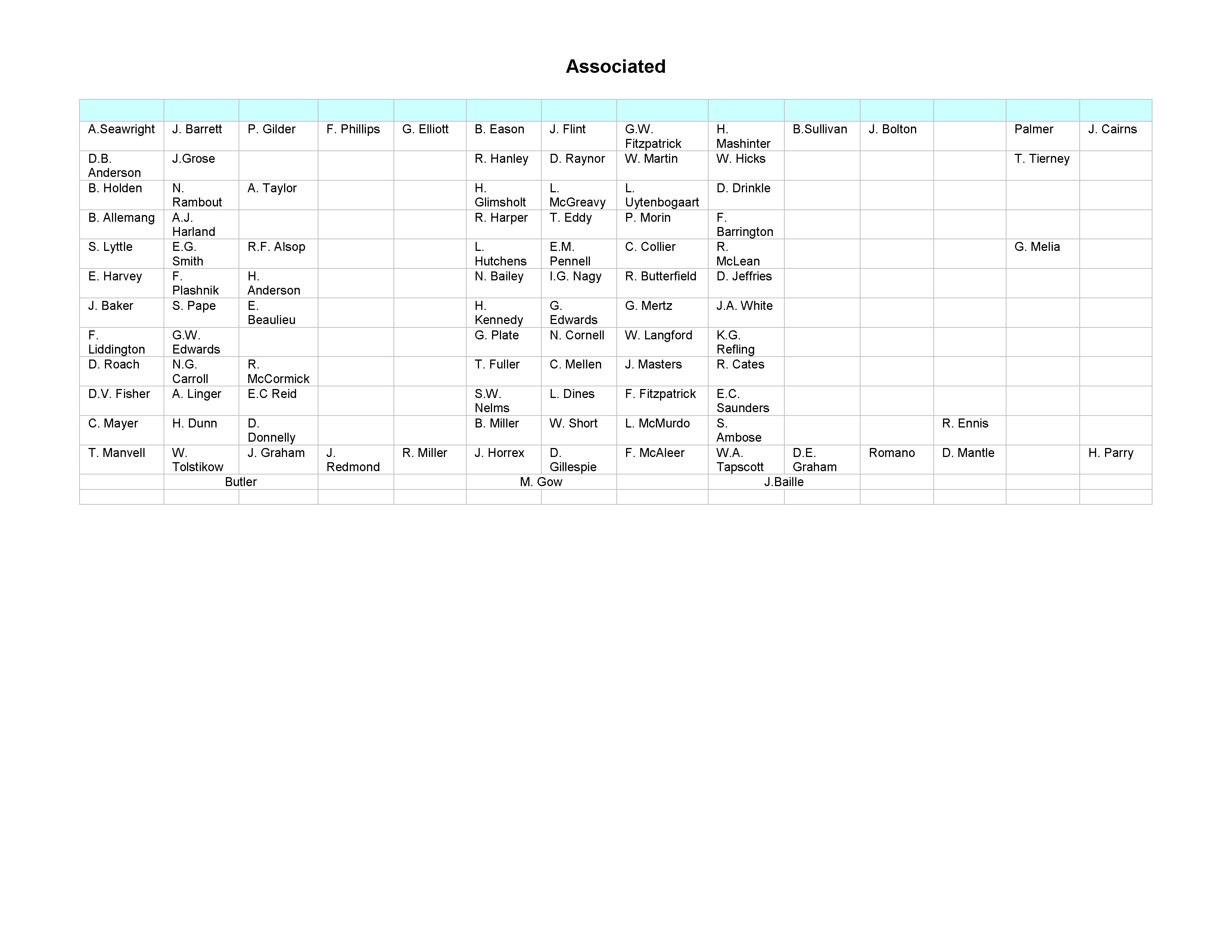

The youth of Malton, Ontario, as in every other hamlet, town or city in Canada, needed the benefits of organized sports. In winter, the sport was hockey. The village elders recognized this and founded the Malton Minor Hockey Association (MMHA) in 1949. The first Executive of the MMHA were: Alex McPherson, Ron McNeil, Jack Weech and Don Williams.

== History ==
The Malton Association joined the Toronto Township Hockey League in 1949. The Toronto Township Hockey League became the Mississauga Hockey League in 1968.

From 1949 to 1968, MMHA teams had to go to Dixie Arena, Port Credit and Huron Park to Play their games. In the mid-60’s practice was held at Nobleton Arena.

In 1966, the Malton Memorial Recreation Association Incorporated (MMRAI) was formed to build Malton its own arena. On Saturday October 19, 1968 Malton Arena was officially opened by Chic Murray.

Greg Anaka (Order of Canada) was the President of the MMRAI. F. O'Donnell was 1st VP, J. Brankley was 2nd VP, George Drennen was Treasurer and Al Vickress was Secretary. Directors were: Frank McKechnie, D. McPhail, L. Faubert, J. Nind, A. McPherson, Roy Adkins, J.P. Gould, A. Wedgewood, W. E. Harris, M. Bardsley, B. Lavery, J. Terrion, M. Peeling, Tom Brassard, D.J. McGowan, A. Sherwin, G. Belanger, V. Drew, F. Giguere, J. McNab, J. Holley, R.Birchard, S. Flaourt, D. Mantle, W. Newbound, W. Campbell, H. Knell, W. Peeling, L. Van Bilson, J. Farrall, D. Lewis, C. Peterson, H. Duncan, C. Grainger, W.J. McCarron, T. Rich, R.R. Russell, K.G. Savery, N.F. Timmons, M. Watkins, J. Watson and T. Williams.

Malton Arena continues to operate today, albeit is run by the City of Mississauga Parks and Recreation Department.

Alex McPherson was President of the MMHA from 1966 to 1973. The president for Malton’s final year of operations was Ivan Elliot. Ivan and his wife Leona were responsible for spearheading the actions that resulted in the birth of the Credit Valley Wolves.

The following MMHA Coaches and Executive have been inducted into the Mississauga Hockey League (MHL) Hall of Fame:

- Morley Peeling (1969)
- Alex McPherson (1970)
- Jack Weech (1971)
- Greg Anaka (1976)
- Bill Peeling (1979)
- Ed Armstrong (1980)

The MMHA ceased to exist at the end of the 2004-2005 season. The Malton Ice Bears morphed into the Credit Valley Wolves in 2005. Credit Valley Wolves website.

== Alumni ==
- Ron Ellis, Stanley Cup 1967.
- Paul Coffey, Stanley Cup-winning Defenseman and member of Hockey Hall of Fame.
