= Greg Anaka =

Greg Anaka CM (died 20 April 1976) was from Winnipeg, Manitoba, and moved to Malton, Ontario in 1960.

He was president of the Malton Memorial Recreation Association Incorporated (MMRAI) which was instrumental in the construction of the Malton Arena in 1968. The arena was the home of the Malton Minor Hockey Association.

He was a Director of the Mississauga Hockey League.

He was the first president of the Mississauga Chapter of the Association for Children with Learning Disabilities.

In December 1973, Anaka was named to the Order of Canada and invested by Jules Léger in April 1974.

Anaka was inducted into the Mississauga Hockey League Hall of Fame in May 1976. The City of Mississauga named Anaka Drive in honour of his work in the Malton, Ontario community.

He died on 20 April 1976.
