= Ontario Lacrosse Association =

Canadian non-profit sports organization

- Sport: Lacrosse
- Jurisdiction: Provincial
- Abbreviation: OLA
- Founded: 1897
- Affiliation: Lacrosse Canada
- Headquarters: Toronto, Ontario
- President: Sean O'Callaghan

Official website
- ontariolacrosse.com
- (Ontario)

The Ontario Lacrosse Association (Ontario Lacrosse) is a not-for-profit sport organization and a member association of the Canadian Lacrosse Association, the national governing body for lacrosse in Canada. The Ontario Lacrosse Association is the largest provincial lacrosse governing body within Canada. The mission of Ontario Lacrosse is to grow, lead, promote, and govern the sport of lacrosse within the province by fostering participation at every level. It was established in 1897.

One of the oldest team sports in North America, the origins of lacrosse lie with the Native American people who lived in Ontario, Quebec and western New York. The first written rules were established in 1867, and although formal amateur provincial competition began in 1887, the Ontario Lacrosse Association was not established as the provincial governing body of the sport until ten years later. In the 1930s, the birth of box lacrosse (indoor lacrosse) increased the popularity of the sport among both athletes and observers. Although official competition was impacted by the number of participants available during both World War I and World War II, lacrosse teams have maintained activity on an annual basis since the inception of the Ontario Lacrosse Association.

== Leadership ==
Board of Directors

Sean O'Callaghan, President

Ian Garrison, VP Officiating

Danielle Carroll, VP Promotion

Brent McCauley, VP Junior - Major Lacrosse

George MacDonald, VP Finance

Rick Phillips, VP Coaching

Kevin Schmitt - VP Development

Jennifer Price, VP Field Lacrosse

Mary Sticca, VP Minor Lacrosse

Marion Ladouceur, Past President

Staff

Jeramie Bailey — Executive Director

Colleen Grimes — Communications Director

Haylee Hutchcraft — Events Director

Neil Macdonald — Officiating Director

Ron MacSpadyen — Programs Director

Fiona Clevely — Administration

Peter Flook — Administration

Cam Milligan — Community Outreach

Jason Rudge — Coaching Director

== Leagues ==
Senior

- Major Series Lacrosse (MSL) - Senior A
- Ontario Series Lacrosse (OSL) - Senior B
- Senior Series Lacrosse (SSL) - Senior C
- Women's Major Series Lacrosse (WMSL)
- Ontario Senior Men's Field Lacrosse League (OSMFLL)

Junior

- Ontario Junior Lacrosse League (OJLL) - Junior A
- Ontario Junior B Lacrosse League (OJBLL)
- Ontario Junior C Lacrosse League (OJCLL)
- Ontario Junior Men's Field Lacrosse League (OJMFLL)

Minor

- Ontario Minor Field Lacrosse League (OMFLL)
- Ontario Women's Field Lacrosse League (OWFL)

== Minor box lacrosses ==
There are 66 minor box lacrosse clubs in the Ontario Lacrosse Association. Minor box clubs are divided into zones for league play and the provincial champion is crowned in 6 divisions every August at the Ontario Lacrosse Festival in Durham Region.

== National championships ==
The champion of four of the OLA's five box leagues compete in national championships:

- Senior A - Mann Cup
- Senior B - Presidents Cup
- Junior A - Minto Cup
- Junior B - Founders Cup
