= Ontario Junior C Lacrosse League =

Canadian sports league

- Sport: Box lacrosse
- Founded: 2008
- Commissioner: Jim Lowe
- No. of teams: 15
- Country: Canada
- Most recent champion: Six Nations Stealth (2026)
- Most titles: Clarington Shamrox; Peterborough Lakers (4 titles each)

The Ontario Junior C Lacrosse League (OJCLL) is a box lacrosse league sanctioned by the Ontario Lacrosse Association in Canada. The league features teams split into three regional divisions. OJCLL annually play a 16-game schedule and playoffs for the Meredith Cup league championship.

== History ==
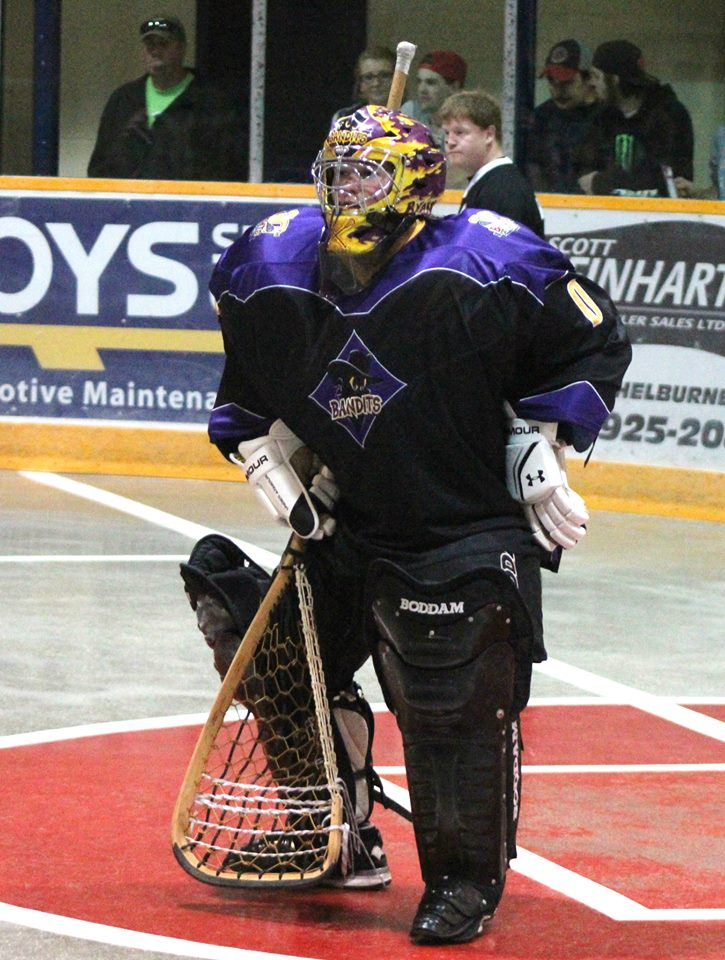
Caledon goalie during 2015 season

Junior C lacrosse was first sanctioned in Ontario in 1972. A seven-team league played a 20-game schedule and playoffs. After peaking in 1975 with 18 teams and three divisions, Junior C lacrosse dissolved after the 1979 season.

A new OJCLL began operation in 2008 with five teams (Caledon Bandits, Centre Wellington Warlords, Innisfil Wolfpack, Shelburne Vets, West Durham Patriots). Caledon Bandits won that first 2008 title over Centre Wellington.

In 2009 the league added three more teams in Clarington, Kingston and Peterborough. The Caledon Bandits would defend their title defeating Peterborough 3–1 in the final best of five.

While 2010 saw the same teams in the league however the West Durham team would relocate to Whitby plus we would see a new champion in the Clarington Shamrox which would be their first of three titles in a row as they took out Centre Wellington 3–0 in the final.

The 2011 season saw a huge change in the league as it expanded from eight teams with the addition of Halton Hills, Hamilton, Mimico and Wilmot in the west. Eastern expansion included new teams in Brockville, Cornwall, Gloucester, Kahnawake and Nepean. The Huntsville Hawks would also drop down from Junior "B" to join the league while the Centre Wellington Warlords ownership changed and were rebranded as the Fergus Thistles. Clarington Shamrox would take their second title with a win over Peterborough Lakers.

The 2012 campaign saw the league lose two east clubs after just one season as Nepean and Kahnawake did not return. Clarington would take their third title in a row over Halton Hills in the final.

In 2013 the league would stay the same in the number of teams at 16 however there would be a new champion crowned as the Halton Hills Bulldogs took the title in an overtime thriller in Cornwall defeating the three time champs from Clarington 11–10. It was the last year of the tournament format to crown a champion.

In 2014 the league lost another eastern team as Brockville Ballistic ceased operations while the Oakville Hawks and the Six Nations Warriors came in. The league switched back to an East-West division format which saw the Cornwall Celtics defeat the defending champions from Halton Hills 3–0 to win their first title.

The 2015 season saw the Kingston Kings and Hamilton Bengals cease operations. The Peterborough Lakers would claim their first championship as they swept the Six Nations Warriors 3–0 in the league finals.

There was controversy during the 2015 season involving the Six Nations Warriors, who finished with 16 wins and no losses to close out the regular season. It was soon brought to the attention of the Ontario Lacrosse Association that the Warriors had multiple roster violations. In turn, the Warriors forfeited 13 of their wins and dropped from first place in the West Division to seventh. The Warriors would sweep the first two rounds of the playoffs and would not lose a game on the floor until Game 3 of the West Division Finals against the Fergus Thistles. In the 2015 Meredith Cup Finals, the Six Nations Warriors would fall to the Lakers, who swept the series in three games (10–7, 10–3, 9–4).

2016 would see a shift in power in the West Division. The 2015 West champion Warriors dropped to third in the regular season standings while Wilmot Wild and the Fergus Thistles tied for top spot with identical 14–2 records. Both clubs would coast through the first two rounds of the postseason before meeting up in the West finals for the first time. The Wild would get the better of the Thistles by sweeping the series 3–0 en route to their first-ever Meredith Cup Finals appearance.

Since 2014, the East division has been dominated by the play of the Peterborough Lakers and the Clarington Shamrox. They faced off in the East finals in 2015 and again in 2016. In what will go down as one of the most tightly contested playoff series in league history, the Shamrox would eventually eke out a 4–3 win in Game 5 in front of a packed Garnett B. Rickard Arena in Clarington. Clarington went on to sweep the Wild 4–0 despite some close contests. It was their fourth Meredith Cup in seven years. The Shelburne Vets, one of the original five teams from the league reboot, would play their last game in 2016.

The 2017 season brought the Brantford Warriors their second year in the West Division, and they captured the league championship, returning the Meredith Cup to the Western Conference. In their inaugural 2016 season, the Warriors posted a 7–8–1 record before being eliminated by Halton Hills in the first round of the playoffs. The following year, however, culminated in a remarkable Meredith Cup championship run. Brantford finished the 2017 regular season with a 9–7 record, earning fourth place in the Western Conference. After defeating Oakville in the opening round, the Warriors continued their underdog run by upsetting the top-ranked Six Nations in the second round and then defeating Fergus in the conference finals.

The Warriors advanced to the Meredith Cup Final to face the top-ranked Clarington Shamrocks, who had lost only two regulation games all season and had swept through the first two rounds of the playoffs. Clarington entered the series as the overwhelming favorite. Brantford was able to rewrite the script and upset the shamrocks in 6 game and have the west take home the trophy which hadn't been done for many years prior in only the 2nd year of the organization operating.

An operating agreement between the OLA and the FCQ in 2018 added two teams to the OJCLL. The North Shore Kodiaks and South Shore Centurions, members of the FCQ from the Montreal area, became the first members of an OLA Junior league from a different province.

In 2019, the Whitby Warriors would complete the first-ever perfect season, completing a 16–0 regular season while sweeping each team on route to their first Meredith Cup. After a first-round bye, the Warriors handled the Clarington Shamrox, winning 16–7, 9–5, and 17–10. In the second straight year, the Warriors would battle with the Peterborough Lakers in the East Finals. The Warriors finally got their chance to take down the Lakers, and swept the series by scores of 21–8, 17–10, and 17–6. Whitby would face the Fergus Thistles in the finals with each game decided by one goal. The Warriors finished the series off in Game 4 to cap off the perfect 26–0 season. During the season Matt Shand would set the season points record with 109 (31 goals, 78 assists) in just 14 games. The former Green Gaels Jr. B standout would add another 68 points in nine playoff games. Mike Andersson would set the rookie season points record with 77 (39 goals and 38 assists) and finish second overall in scoring that year.

The Orangeville Northmen joined the league in 2022, quickly finding success and winning the Meredith Cup in their very first season.

2023 ushered in change for the OJCLL, with Barrie's Jim Lowe taking over the role of commissioner from Reg Hollinshead, who was elected Vice-President Junior to Major Lacrosse for the OLA. The North Shore Kodiaks became the first Quebec team to win a regular season Conference Championship title, while Evan McDougall of Fergus broke the rookie season points record with 92 (43 goals and 49 assists), becoming the youngest player ever to capture the Junior C scoring title. The Kodiaks would go on to win the Meredith Cup, the only Quebec team to do so in the history of the Championship.

The OJCLL welcomed a new expansion team from Akwesasne, the Phantoms, for the 2024 season. A off-season dispute between the OLA and FCQ resulted in the operating agreement that had permitted the Kodiaks and the Centurions to compete in the league. A subsequent agreement provided OLA membership to the Kodiaks for 2024 and 2025, ensuring that the team could attempt to defend its 2023 Meredith Cup Championship.

2025 brought further change to the league, with Barrie being promoted to Junior B by the Ontario Lacrosse Association and the league returning to Kahnawake Mohawk Territory. Due to operational issues, the original Akwesasne franchise was replaced by the new Akwesasne Lightning. In order to reflect the geographic changes, the league moved to a three-division format for 2025 and added cross-over play for the first time.

== Teams ==
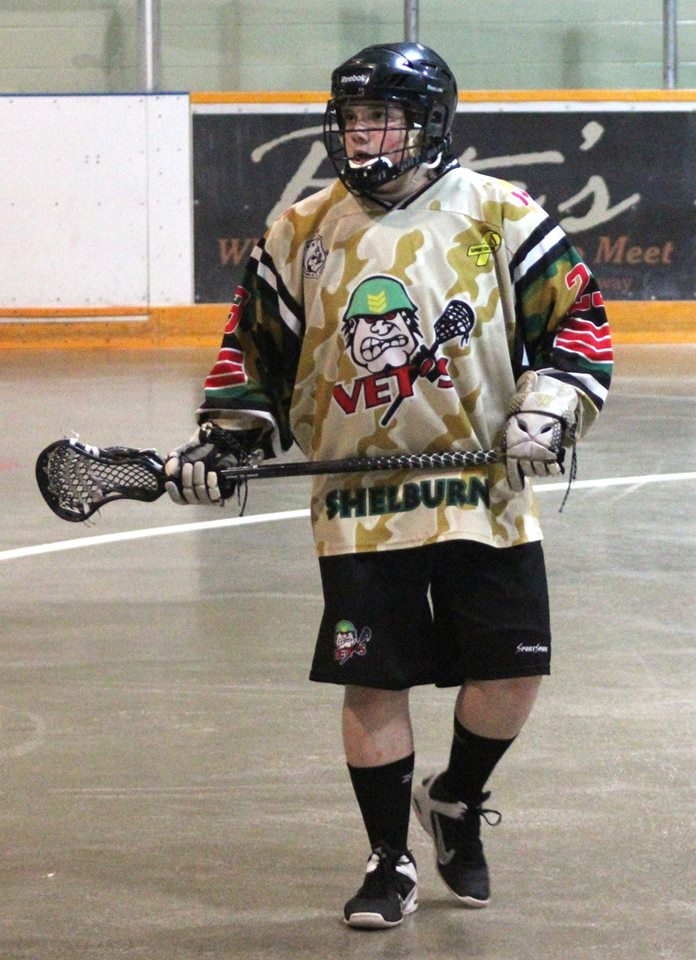
Shelburne player during 2015 season.

East Division	Team	First season
East Division	Akwesasne Lightning	2025
East Division	Cornwall Celtics	2011
East Division	Kahnawake Hunters	2025
East Division	Nepean Knights	2011
East Division	Kodiaks Rive-Nord	2018
Central Division	Team	First season
Central Division	Clarington Shamrox	2009
Central Division	Halton Hills Bulldogs	2011
Central Division	Huntsville Hawks	2011
Central Division	Peterborough Lakers	2009
Central Division	Whitby Warriors	2010
West Division	Team	First season
West Division	Burlington Warriors	2016
West Division	Fergus Thistles	2011
West Division	Orangeville Northmen	2020
West Division	Six Nations Stealth	2022
West Division	Wilmot Wild	2011

=== Former teams ===
- Akwesasne Phantoms (2024) - replaced by Akwesasne Lightning
- Barrie Bombers (2015–2024) - promoted to Ontario Junior B Lacrosse League
- Brantford Warriors (2016–2024) - relocated to Burlington
- Brockville Ballistic (2011–14)
- Caledon Bandits (2008–19)
- Centre Wellington Warlords (2008–10) - changed name to Fergus Thistles
- Eastern Townships Extreme Eagles (2018–19)
- Gloucester Griffins (2011–18)
- Hamilton Bengals (2011–14) - on hiatus during 2015 then moved to Brantford
- Innisfil Wolfpack (2008–12) - relocated to Newmarket
- Kahnawake Hunters (2011–12)
- Kingston Kings (2009–14) - on hiatus in 2015 before folding in 2016
- Mimico Mountaineers (2011–18)
- Nepean Knights (2011–12)
- Newmarket Saints (2013–14) - relocated to Barrie
- Oakville Hawks (2014–19)
- Shelburne Vets (2008–16) - on hiatus in 2017 before folding in 2018
- South Shore Centurions (2018–2023)
- Six Nations Warriors (2013–18)
- West Durham Patriots (2008–09) - relocated to Whitby

== Champions ==
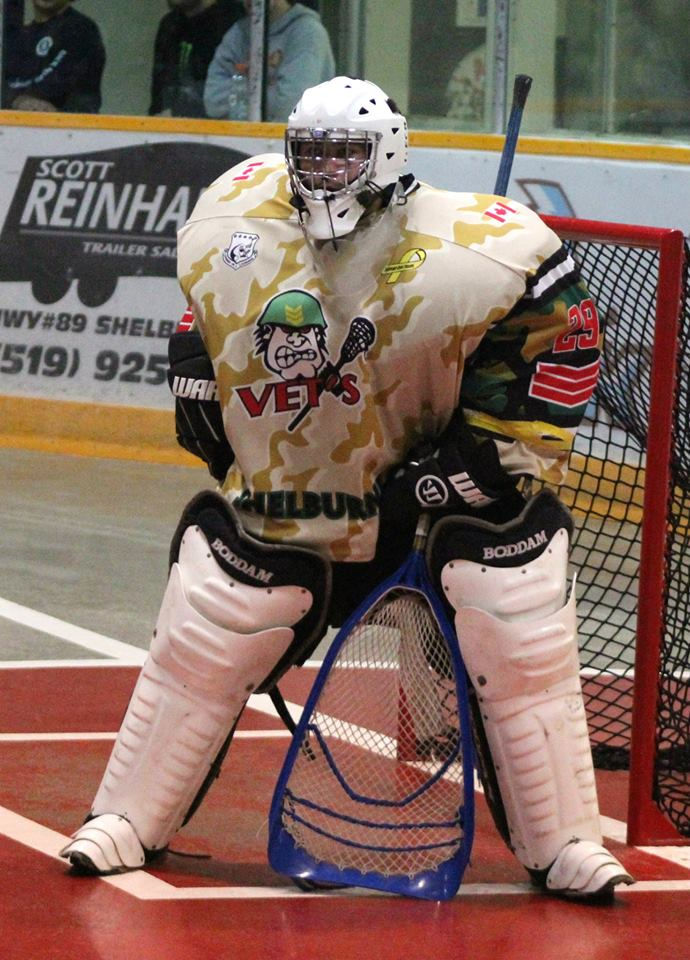
Shelburne goalie during 2015 season.

Season	Winner	Runner-up	Result
President's Cup
1972	Windsor Jr. Warlocks	Etobicoke PCO's	18-15
1973	Windsor AKO Fratmen	Brockville Magedommas	2–0 (best-of 3)
1974	Nepean PCO's	Bolton Wanderers	2–0 (best-of 3)
1975	Mississauga Medics	Point Edward Easy Movers	10-5
1976	Orangeville Stingers	Owen Sound Satellites	4–0 (best-of 7)
1977	Owen Sound Satellites	Orangeville Stingers	4–0 (best-of 7)
1978	Owen Sound Forsythes	Orillia Lions	4–0 (best-of 7)
1979	Owen Sound Signmen	Orillia Lions	
Meredith Cup
2008	Caledon Bandits	Centre Wellington Warlords	4–2 (best-of 7)
2009	Caledon Bandits	Peterborough Lakers	3–1 (best-of 5)
2010	Clarington Shamrox	Centre Wellington Warlords	3–0 (best-of 5)
2011	Clarington Shamrox	Peterborough Lakers	3–1 (best-of 5)
2012	Clarington Shamrox	Halton Hills Bulldogs	8-6
2013	Halton Hills Bulldogs	Clarington Shamrox	11-10, OT
2014	Cornwall Celtics	Halton Hills Bulldogs	3–0 (best-of 5)
2015	Peterborough Lakers	Six Nations Warriors	3–0 (best-of 5)
2016	Clarington Shamrox	Wilmot Wild	4–0 (best-of 7)
2017	Brantford Warriors	Clarington Shamrox	4–2 (best-of 7)
2018	Peterborough Lakers	Wilmot Wild	4–1 (best-of 7)
2019	Whitby Warriors	Fergus Thistles	4–0 (best-of 7)
2020	Season cancelled due to COVID-19		
2021	Season cancelled due to COVID-19		
2022	Orangeville Northmen	Clarington Shamrox	4–3 (best-of 7)
2023	North Shore Kodiaks	Wilmot Wild	4–1 (best-of 7)
2024	Peterborough Lakers	Fergus Thistles	3-0 (best-of 5)
2025	Peterborough Lakers	Burlington Warriors	3-0 (best-of 5)
2026	Six Nations Stealth	Peterborough Lakers	3-1 (best-of 4)
