= 2018 Thunder Bay District municipal elections =

Elections were held in the organized municipalities in the Thunder Bay District of Ontario on October 22, 2018 in conjunction with municipal elections across the province.

== Conmee ==
Mayor

| Mayoral Candidate | Vote | % |
|---|---|---|
| Kevin Holland (X) | 175 | 58.53 |
| Suzanne Huot | 124 | 41.47 |

Town Council (4 to be elected)

| Candidate | Vote | % |
|---|---|---|
| Crystal Olson | 204 | 19.8 |
| Grant Arnold (X) | 190 | 18.5 |
| Sheila Maxwell (X) | 185 | 18.0 |
| Leslie Kivisto | 175 | 17.0 |
| L.O. (Mutti) Pajamaki | 155 | 15.1 |
| Gayle Manns | 119 | 11.6 |

== Dorion ==
Reeve

| Reeve Candidate | Vote | % |
|---|---|---|
| Ed Chambers (X) | Acclaimed | |

Town Council (4 to be elected)

| Candidate | Vote | % |
|---|---|---|
| Robert Beatty | Acclaimed | |
| Joel Brown | Acclaimed | |
| Carter Ann (Kitty) Dumonski | Acclaimed | |
| Deborah Shallow | Acclaimed | |

== Gillies ==
Reeve

| Reeve Candidate | Vote | % |
|---|---|---|
| Wendy Wright (X) | Acclaimed | |

Town Council (4 to be elected)

| Candidate | Vote | % |
|---|---|---|
| Karen O'Gorman (X) | 116 | 20.5 |
| Rudy Buitenhuis (X) | 112 | 19.8 |
| William J. Groenheide (X) | 92 | 16.3 |
| Elizabeth Jones | 89 | 15.7 |
| Rox-Anne Moore | 85 | 15.0 |
| Allison Gilmour | 71 | 12.6 |

== Greenstone ==
Mayor

| Mayoral Candidate | Vote | % |
|---|---|---|
| Renald Y. Beaulieu (X) | 1,306 | 70.44 |
| Eric Konrad Pietsch | 548 | 29.56 |

Municipal Council

| Candidate | Vote | % |
Beardmore Ward (1 to be elected)
| Claudette Trottier (X) | 96 | 71.1 |
| Eileen Johnson | 39 | 28.9 |
Geraldton Ward (2 to be elected)
| John Marino Jr. | 703 | 46.6 |
| William (Bill) Assad (X) | 618 | 41.0 |
| Maurice Gosselin | 186 | 12.3 |
Longlac Ward (2 to be elected)
| Elaine Mannisto | Acclaimed | |
| James McPherson (X) | Acclaimed | |
Nakina Ward (1 to be elected)
| Claudette Abraham | Acclaimed | |
Rural East Ward (1 to be elected)
| Gloria McCraw | Acclaimed | |
Rural West Ward (1 to be elected)
| Andre Blanchard (X) | Acclaimed | |

== Manitouwadge ==
Mayor

| Mayoral Candidate | Vote | % |
|---|---|---|
| John Maceachern | 349 | 42.77 |
| Peter Ruel | 347 | 42.52 |
| Andy Major (X) | 104 | 12.75 |
| Joseph Freitas | 16 | 1.96 |

Town Council (4 to be elected)

| Candidate | Vote | % |
|---|---|---|
| Jim Moffat | 639 | 20.7 |
| Kathy Hudson | 561 | 18.2 |
| David Arola | 432 | 14.0 |
| Mike Scapinello | 371 | 12.0 |
| Dan Fairservice | 299 | 9.7 |
| Bill Boyd | 198 | 6.4 |
| Robert Knipple | 166 | 5.4 |
| Sheldon Plummer (X) | 137 | 4.4 |
| Ed Dunnill (X) | 98 | 3.2 |
| Raymond Lelièvre (X) | 81 | 2.6 |
| Gordon MacDonald | 59 | 1.9 |
| Rick Germaine | 38 | 1.2 |

== Marathon ==
Mayor

| Mayoral Candidate | Vote | % |
|---|---|---|
| Rick Dumas (X) | Acclaimed | |

Town Council (4 to be elected)

| Candidate | Vote | % |
|---|---|---|
| Ray Lake (X) | 610 | 19.5 |
| Greg Vallance | 565 | 18.0 |
| Kelly Tsubouchi (X) | 450 | 14.3 |
| Chantal Gingras (X) | 449 | 14.3 |
| David Lowndes | 354 | 11.3 |
| Shawna Fedoruk | 313 | 10.0 |
| Kris Skworshinski | 220 | 7.0 |
| Darlene Cross | 174 | 5.5 |

== Neebing ==
Mayor

| Mayoral Candidate | Vote | % |
|---|---|---|
| Erwin Butikofer | 378 | 81.12 |
| Dick Facca | 88 | 18.88 |

Municipal Council

| Candidate | Vote | % |
Ward 1 - Blake
| Mark Roger Thibert | Acclaimed | |
Ward 2 - Crooks
| Brian Wright (X) | Acclaimed | |
Ward 3 - Pardee
| Curtis Coulson (X) | Acclaimed | |
Ward 4 - Pearson
| Gary Gardner | Acclaimed | |
Ward 5 - Scoble
| Brian Kurikka | Acclaimed | |
Councillor at Large
| Gordon Cuthbertson | Acclaimed | |

== Nipigon ==
Mayor

| Mayoral Candidate | Vote | % |
|---|---|---|
| Richard Harvey (X) | 310 | 52.54 |
| Gordon MacKenzie | 263 | 44.58 |
| Barry Laukkanen | 17 | 2.88 |

Town Council (4 to be elected)

| Candidate | Vote | % |
|---|---|---|
| John Zechner Jr. | 500 | 24.6 |
| James Foulds (X) | 498 | 24.5 |
| Michael Elliott (X) | 385 | 18.9 |
| Levina Collins (X) | 333 | 16.4 |
| Glenn Hart | 318 | 15.6 |

== O'Connor ==
Mayor

| Mayoral Candidate | Vote | % |
|---|---|---|
| Jim Vezina (X) | Acclaimed | |

Town Council (4 to be elected)

| Candidate | Vote | % |
|---|---|---|
| Wendy Handy (X) | 121 | 23.8 |
| Bishop Racicor (X) | 114 | 22.4 |
| Alexander Crane | 109 | 21.4 |
| Jerry Loan (X) | 99 | 19.4 |
| Jonathon Hari | 66 | 13 |

== Oliver Paipoonge ==
Mayor

| Mayoral Candidate | Vote | % |
|---|---|---|
| Lucy Kloosterhuis (X) | Acclaimed | |

Town Council (4 to be elected)

| Candidate | Vote | % |
|---|---|---|
| Bernie Kamphof (X) | 982 | 18.5 |
| Brandon Postuma | 913 | 17.2 |
| Alana Bishop (X) | 906 | 17.1 |
| Alan Vis (X) | 794 | 15.0 |
| Jim Byers (X) | 711 | 13.4 |
| Jim Cassan | 563 | 10.6 |
| Todd Merke | 441 | 8.3 |

== Red Rock ==
Mayor

| Mayoral Candidate | Vote | % |
|---|---|---|
| Gary Nelson (X) | 253 | 76.90 |
| Raymond Rivard | 76 | 23.10 |

Town Council (4 to be elected)

| Candidate | Vote | % |
|---|---|---|
| Sara Park (X) | 232 | |
| Gord Muir | 220 | |
| Larry Woods | 218 | |
| Darquise Robinson (X) | 200 | |
| Cam Todesco | 153 | |
| Steve Carruthers (X) | 152 | |

== Schreiber ==
Mayor

| Mayoral Candidate | Vote | % |
|---|---|---|
| Dave Hamilton | 419 | 71.38 |
| Dominic Commisso | 168 | 28.62 |

Town Council (4 to be elected)

| Candidate | Vote | % |
|---|---|---|
| Kevin Mullins | 421 | 22.8 |
| Kim Krause | 367 | 19.9 |
| Daniel McGrath | 301 | 16.3 |
| Douglas Stefurak | 275 | 14.9 |
| David Mauro (X) | 262 | 14.2 |
| Doug Sales (X) | 217 | 11.8 |

== Shuniah ==
Mayor

| Mayoral Candidate | Vote | % |
|---|---|---|
| Wendy Landry (X) | Acclaimed | |

Town Council

| Candidate | Vote | % |
MacGregor Ward (3 to be elected)
| Donna Blunt (X) | 837 | 28.6 |
| Don Smith (X) | 725 | 24.8 |
| Ron Giardetti (X) | 723 | 24.7 |
| Ashley McRae | 327 | 11.2 |
| Angela Calaiezzi | 312 | 10.7 |
McTavish Ward (1 to be elected)
| Duff Stewart (X) | 169 | 52.2 |
| Jo-Anne Hamelin | 155 | 47.8 |

== Terrace Bay ==
Mayor

| Mayoral Candidate | Vote | % |
|---|---|---|
| Jody Davis (X) | 412 | 65.19 |
| Gino Leblanc | 220 | 34.81 |

Town Council (4 to be elected)

| Candidate | Vote | % |
|---|---|---|
| Paul Malashewski | 473 | 21.9 |
| Michael Moore (X) | 457 | 21.2 |
| Rick St. Louis | 426 | 19.7 |
| Bert Johnson (X) | 422 | 19.5 |
| Karen Morley (X) | 382 | 17.7 |

== Thunder Bay ==
=== Mayor ===
| Mayoral Candidate | Vote | % |
|---|---|---|
| Bill Mauro | 13,940 | 33.91 |
| Frank Pullia | 13,178 | 32.06 |
| Iain Angus | 5,816 | 14.15 |
| Shane Judge | 5,155 | 12.54 |
| Ronald Chookomolin | 895 | 2.18 |
| Mariann Sawicki | 792 | 1.93 |
| Peter Panetta | 708 | 1.72 |
| Wolfgang Schoor | 244 | 0.59 |
| Jim Gamble | 189 | 0.46 |
| Kevin Cernjul | 151 | 0.37 |
| Ed Hailio | 40 | 0.10 |

=== City council ===
Map of Thunder Bay's wards

==== Current River Ward ====
| Candidate | Vote | % |
|---|---|---|
| Andrew Foulds (X) | 2,956 | 59.98 |
| Andy Wolff | 1,225 | 24.44 |
| Dick Waddington | 508 | 10.14 |
| Jamie Cressman | 323 | 6.44 |

==== McIntyre Ward ====
| Candidate | Vote | % |
|---|---|---|
| Albert Aiello | 3,381 | 49.88 |
| Wesley Ramage | 2,703 | 39.88 |
| Adam Gulbinowicz | 694 | 10.24 |

==== McKellar Ward ====
| Candidate | Vote | % |
|---|---|---|
| Brian Hamilton | 1,964 | 42.1 |
| Ashley Nurmela | 1,273 | 27.3 |
| Robert Jankovic | 903 | 19.3 |
| Donald McLeod | 529 | 11.3 |

==== Neebing Ward ====
| Candidate | Vote | % |
|---|---|---|
| Cody Fraser | 1,427 | 32.53 |
| Linda Rydholm (X) | 1,327 | 30.25 |
| Roberta Sawchyn | 967 | 22.04 |
| Robin Rickards | 354 | 8.07 |
| Richard Gunn | 312 | 7.11 |

==== Northwood Ward ====
| Candidate | Vote | % |
|---|---|---|
| Shelby Ch'ng (X) | 3,495 | 65.24 |
| Mo El Kahil | 1,862 | 34.76 |

==== Red River Ward ====
| Candidate | Vote | % |
|---|---|---|
| Brian McKinnon (X) | 3,143 | 44.16 |
| David George Noonan | 2,933 | 41.21 |
| Donna Brown | 1,042 | 14.64 |

==== Westfort Ward ====
| Candidate | Vote | % |
|---|---|---|
| Kristen Oliver | 2,752 | 46.53 |
| Frank Scarcello | 1,901 | 32.14 |
| Joe Virdiramo (X) | 1,261 | 21.32 |

==== At Large (5 to be elected) ====
| Candidate | Vote | % |
|---|---|---|
| Peng You | 20,346 | 11.79 |
| Aldo Ruberto (X) | 14,745 | 8.55 |
| Trevor Giertuga | 11,748 | 6.81 |
| Rebecca Johnson (X) | 11,692 | 6.78 |
| Mark Bentz | 11,074 | 6.42 |
| Larry Hebert (X) | 8,807 | 5.10 |
| Norm Staal | 8,212 | 4.76 |
| Margaret Wanlin | 7,930 | 4.60 |
| Moe (Maureen) Comuzzi | 7,710 | 4.47 |
| Mark Figliomeni | 6,877 | 3.99 |
| Kim Ducharme | 6,633 | 3.84 |
| Stephen Lawrence Margarit | 6,098 | 3.53 |
| Jim Stadey | 5,904 | 3.42 |
| Jeff Upton | 5,314 | 3.08 |
| Lawrence Timko | 5,065 | 2.94 |
| Charmaine McGraw | 4,451 | 2.58 |
| Jim Howie | 4,411 | 2.56 |
| Lori Paras | 3,767 | 2.18 |
| Chris Krumpholz | 3,216 | 1.86 |
| Orville Santa | 3,145 | 1.82 |
| Tracey MacKinnon | 3,129 | 1.81 |
| Diane Armstrong | 3,088 | 1.79 |
| Marty Rajala | 2,906 | 1.68 |
| Derek W. Lankinen | 2,826 | 1.64 |
| Viktor Saari | 2,486 | 1.44 |
| Frank A. Wazinski | 973 | 0.56 |

== English Public School Board Elections ==
Lakehead District School Board (8 to be elected)
| Candidate | Vote | % |
|---|---|---|
| Deborah Massaro (X) | 10,057 | |
| Ellen Chambers (X) | 9,445 | |
| Marg Arnone (X) | 9,334 | |
| Ron Oikonen (X) | 9,167 | |
| Trudy Tuchenhagen (X) | 9,127 | |
| George Saarinen (X) | 8,317 | |
| Sue Doughty-Smith | 7,655 | |
| Ryan Sitch | 7,390 | |
| Jack Playford (X) | 7,265 | |
| Cheri Lappage | 6,896 | |
| Pat Johansen | 6,819 | |
| Laura Sylvestre | 6,426 | |
| Ryan Moore | 6,421 | |
| Debbie Lapierre | 6,371 | |
| Adrienne Kromm | 5,168 | |
| Karl Skogstad | 4,545 | |
| R. M. Zale | 3,816 | |
| Dwayne Radbourne | 3,362 | |

Superior-Greenstone District School Board
| Candidate | Vote | % |
Greenstone (2 to be elected)
| Mark Mannisto | Acclaimed | |
| Allison Pelletier | Acclaimed | |
Manitouwadge (1 to be elected)
| Christine Major | Acclaimed | |
Marathon (2 to be elected)
| Margaret McIntyre | Acclaimed | |
| Pauline (Pinky) McRae | Acclaimed | |
Nipigon (1 to be elected)
| Kal Pristanski | Acclaimed | |
Red Rock (1 to be elected)
| Michael Groulx | Acclaimed | |
Schreiber/Terrace Bay (1 to be elected)
| Jason Nesbitt | 449 | 61.7 |
| Melissa Lanovaz | 279 | 38.3 |

== English Catholic School Board Elections ==
Thunder Bay Catholic District School Board (6 to be elected)
| Candidate | Vote | % |
|---|---|---|
| Dina McFarlane | 4,471 | |
| Francis Veneruz | 4,390 | |
| Kathy O'Brien (X) | 3,929 | |
| Loretta Fonso | 3,699 | |
| Lawrence Badanai | 3,403 | |
| Eleanor Ashe (X) | 3,299 | |
| Tony Romeo (X) | 3,148 | |
| Don Cattani (X) | 3,019 | |
| Robert DeGagné (X) | 2,979 | |
| Tony Pucci | 2,971 | |
| Father James Panikulam | 2,916 | |
| John Pascuzzo | 2,905 | |
| Bob Hupka (X) | 2,889 | |
| Debbie DeBruyne | 2,667 | |
| Letizia Tremonti | 2,638 | |
| Tom Walters | 2,416 | |

Superior North Catholic District School Board
| Candidate | Vote | % |
Greenstone (Beardmore, Geraldton, Nakina & Rural West)
Greenstone (Longlac & Rural East)
| Lilliana McPherson | Acclaimed | |
Marathon
| Hugh McCorry | Acclaimed | |
Manitouwadge
| Kristy Lachance | Acclaimed | |
Nipigon
| Marline Ilijow | Acclaimed | |
Red Rock & Dorion
| Shirley Jean | Acclaimed | |
Schreiber
| Lawrence McParland | Acclaimed | |
Terrace Bay
| Amanda Monks | Acclaimed | |

== French Public School Board Elections ==
Conseil scolaire public du Grand Nord de l'Ontario
| Candidate | Vote | % |
Manitouwadge & Marathon
| Kristy Trout | Acclaimed | |
Longlac & Thunder Bay
| Anne-Marie Gélineault (X) | Acclaimed | |

== French Catholic School Board Elections ==
Conseil scolaire de district catholique des Aurores boréales
| Candidate | Vote | % |
Thunder Bay (5 to be elected)
| Claudette Gleeson (X) | Acclaimed | |
| Elode Grunerud | Acclaimed | |
| Mariette Langevin (X) | Acclaimed | |
| Alain Lauzon (X) | Acclaimed | |
| Donald Pelletier (X) | Acclaimed | |
Beardmore, Geraldton, Nakina & Rural West (2 to be elected)
| Francine Marcotte Roy | | |
| Jean-Pierre Pelletier | | |
| Monique Perreault | | |
Longlac & Rural East (1 to be elected)
| Sylvie Payeur | Acclaimed | |
Schreiber & Terrace Bay (1 to be elected)
| Real Deschatelets | 48 | 87.3 |
| Benoit Rioux | 7 | 12.7 |
Manitouwadge & Marathon (1 to be elected)
| Maguy Lorek | Acclaimed | |
