= Superior-Greenstone District School Board =

School board in Ontario, Canada

Location
- Marathon Beardmore, Geraldton, Longlac, Nakina, Dorion, Nipigon, Red Rock, Schreiber, Terrace Bay, Marathon and Manitouwadge Canada

District information
- Superintendent: Flora Love (Elementary), Carole Leroux, (Secondary), Alex Martin (Superintendent of Business)
- Director of education: William Goodman
- Schools: 15 Total (10 elementary, 5 secondary)

Students and staff
- Students: 1,583 (2012-2013)

Other information
- Elected trustees: Pinky McRae (chair), Jason Nesbitt, Dan Fairservice, Allison Jarvis, Megan Brunskill, Pat Liscomb, Kal Pristanski, Julie Michano, Pam Hardy
- Student Trustees: Rylee McLeod, Miley Anthony
- Website: www.sgdsb.on.ca

The Superior-Greenstone District School Board (known as English-language Public District School Board No. 6B prior to 1999) is a public school board in the Canadian province of Ontario, with jurisdiction for the operation of schools in eastern Thunder Bay District.

Superior-Greenstone District School Board is located in Northwestern Ontario and covers a vast area of 45,100 square kilometres. The board is responsible for providing public education, and its 15 schools serve the communities of Beardmore, Geraldton, Longlac, Nakina, Dorion, Nipigon, Red Rock, Schreiber, Terrace Bay, Marathon and Manitouwadge. Its head office is located in Marathon, on the north shore of Lake Superior.

The Superior-Greenstone District School Board has about 1,583 students in 10 elementary schools and 5 secondary schools.

== Elementary schools ==
- B.A. Parker Public School, Geraldton
- Beardmore Public School, Beardmore
- Dorion Public School, Dorion
- George O'Neill Public School, Nipigon
- Manitouwadge Public School, Manitouwadge
- Margaret Twomey Public School, Marathon
- Marjorie Mills Public School, Longlac
- Nakina Public School, Nakina
- Schreiber Public School, Schreiber
- Terrace Bay Public School, Terrace Bay

== Secondary schools ==
- Geraldton Composite High School, Geraldton
- Lake Superior High School, Terrace Bay
- Manitouwadge High School, Manitouwadge
- Marathon High School, Marathon
- Nipigon-Red Rock District High School, Red Rock

== See also ==
- List of school districts in Ontario
- List of high schools in Ontario
