= Superior North Catholic District School Board =

School board in Ontario, Canada

Superior North Catholic District School Board SNCDSB

Location
- Terrace Bay Eastern & Northern Thunder Bay District Canada

District information
- Director of education: Maria Vasanelli
- Schools: 9 Total (9 elementary, 0 secondary)
- Budget: CA$16,902,994 million (2011-2012)
- District ID: B29076

Other information
- Website: www.sncdsb.on.ca

The Superior North Catholic District School Board (SNCDSB, known as English-language Separate District School Board No. 34B prior to 1999) is a separate school board in the Canadian province of Ontario, with jurisdiction for the operation of Catholic schools in the remote areas of Thunder Bay District.

Superior North Catholic District School Board is a small board located in Northwestern Ontario and covers a vast area. The board only provides elementary (Kindergarten to grade 8) education; there are no secondary schools in the board. The board serves the communities of Geraldton, Longlac, Manitouwadge, Marathon, Nakina, Nipigon, Red Rock, Schreiber and Terrace Bay. Its head office is located in Terrace Bay.

== Elementary schools ==
- Holy Angels School, Schreiber
- Holy Saviour School, Marathon
- Our Lady of Fatima School, Longlac
- Our Lady of Lourdes School, Manitouwadge
- St. Brigid School, Nakina
- St. Edward School, Nipigon
- St. Hilary School, Red Rock
- St. Joseph School, Geraldton
- St. Martin School, Terrace Bay

== See also ==
- List of school districts in Ontario
- List of high schools in Ontario
