= List of school districts in Ontario =

This is a list of school districts in Ontario.

There are 76 public school boards in Ontario, including 38 public secular boards (34 English boards and 4 French boards (ACÉPO)), 38 public separate boards (29 English Catholic boards, 8 French Catholic boards and 1 English Protestant board), and 7 public school authorities that operate in children's treatment centres.

== School boards ==
School board	Type	Language	Headquarters	Census division(s) served	Number of elementary and intermediate schools	Number of secondary schools
Algoma District School Board	Public	English	Sault Ste. Marie	Algoma	28	9
Avon Maitland District School Board	Public	English	Seaforth	Huron, Perth	31	9
Bluewater District School Board	Public	English	Chesley	Bruce, Grey	40	9
District School Board of Niagara	Public	English	St. Catharines	Niagara	79	16
District School Board Ontario North East	Public	English	Timmins	Cochrane, Timiskaming	26	11
Durham District School Board	Public	English	Whitby	Durham	107	20
Grand Erie District School Board	Public	English	Brantford	Brant, Haldimand, Norfolk	59	14
Greater Essex County District School Board	Public	English	Windsor	Essex	59	17
Halton District School Board	Public	English	Burlington	Halton	85	17
Hamilton-Wentworth District School Board	Public	English	Hamilton	Hamilton	95	13
Hastings & Prince Edward District School Board	Public	English	Belleville	Hastings, Prince Edward	40	9
James Bay Lowlands Secondary School Board	Public	English	Moosonee	Town of Moosonee	0	1
Kawartha Pine Ridge District School Board	Public	English	Peterborough	Northumberland, Peterborough, Durham (Municipality of Clarington)	73	16
Keewatin-Patricia District School Board	Public	English	Kenora	Kenora	17	6
Lakehead District School Board	Public	English	Thunder Bay	Thunder Bay	26	5
Lambton Kent District School Board	Public	English	Sarnia	Chatham-Kent, Lambton	55	13
Limestone District School Board	Public	English	Kingston	Frontenac, Lennox/Addington	53	12
Moose Factory Island District School Area Board	Public	English	Moose Factory	Town of Moose Factory	1	0
Moosonee District School Area Board	Public	English	Moosonee	Town of Moosonee	1	0
Near North District School Board	Public	English	North Bay	Nipissing, Parry Sound, Muskoka (Northern section)	36	8
Ottawa-Carleton District School Board	Public	English	Ottawa	Ottawa	118	31
Peel District School Board	Public	English	Mississauga	Peel	213	42
Rainbow District School Board	Public	English	Sudbury	Manitoulin, Sudbury	28	10
Rainy River District School Board	Public	English	Fort Frances	Rainy River	11	3
Renfrew County District School Board	Public	English	Pembroke	Renfrew, Nipissing (Southern section)	25	9
Simcoe County District School Board	Public	English	Midhurst	Simcoe	87	23
Superior-Greenstone District School Board	Public	English	Marathon	Thunder Bay (Eastern)	12	5
Thames Valley District School Board	Public	English	London	Elgin, Middlesex, Oxford	131	27
Toronto District School Board	Public	English	Toronto	Toronto	473	105
Trillium Lakelands District School Board	Public	English	Lindsay	Haliburton, Kawartha Lakes, Muskoka	40	8
Upper Canada District School Board (UCDSB)	Public	English	Brockville	Lanark, Leeds/Grenville, Prescott/Russell, Stormont/Dundas/Glengarry	83	24
Upper Grand District School Board	Public	English	Guelph	Dufferin, Wellington	66	14
Waterloo Region District School Board	Public	English	Kitchener	Waterloo	103	17
York Region District School Board	Public	English	Aurora	York	175	33
Conseil des écoles publiques de l'Est de l'Ontario	Public	French	Ottawa	Frontenac, Northumberland, Ottawa, Prescott/Russell, Renfrew, Stormont/Dundas/Glengarry	32	14
Conseil scolaire Viamonde	Public	French	Toronto	Durham, Essex, Halton, Hamilton, Lambton, Niagara, Peel, Simcoe, Toronto, Wellington, Waterloo, York	47	14
Conseil scolaire de district du Grand Nord de l'Ontario	Public	French	Sudbury	Algoma, Sudbury, Thunder Bay	15	9
Conseil scolaire de district du Nord-Est de l'Ontario	Public	French	North Bay	Cochrane, Nipissing, Timiskaming	9	6
Algonquin and Lakeshore Catholic District School Board	Public Catholic	English	Napanee	Frontenac, Hastings, Lennox/Addington	37	6
Brant Haldimand Norfolk Catholic District School Board	Public Catholic	English	Brantford	Brant, Haldimand, Norfolk	30	4
Bruce-Grey Catholic District School Board	Public Catholic	English	Hanover	Bruce, Grey	11	2
Catholic District School Board of Eastern Ontario (CDSBEO)	Public Catholic	English	Kemptville	Lanark, Leeds/Grenville, Prescott/Russell, Stormont/Dundas/Glengarry, Cornwall	41	10
Dufferin-Peel Catholic District School Board	Public Catholic	English	Mississauga	Peel, Dufferin	125	26
Durham Catholic District School Board	Public Catholic	English	Oshawa	Durham	38	8
Halton Catholic District School Board	Public Catholic	English	Burlington	Halton	45	10
Hamilton-Wentworth Catholic District School Board	Public Catholic	English	Hamilton	Hamilton	48	8
Huron-Perth Catholic District School Board	Public Catholic	English	Dublin	Huron, Perth	16	2
Huron-Superior Catholic District School Board	Public Catholic	English	Sault Ste. Marie	Algoma	20	3
Kenora Catholic District School Board	Public Catholic	English	Kenora	Kenora	5	1
London District Catholic School Board	Public Catholic	English	London	Elgin, Middlesex, Oxford	46	9
Niagara Catholic District School Board	Public Catholic	English	Welland	Niagara	51	8
Nipissing-Parry Sound Catholic District School Board	Public Catholic	English	North Bay	Nipissing, Parry Sound	12	1
Northeastern Catholic District School Board	Public Catholic	English	Timmins	Cochrane, Timiskaming	13	2
Northwest Catholic District School Board	Public Catholic	English	Fort Frances	Rainy River, Kenora (Western)	6	0
Ottawa Catholic School Board	Public Catholic	English	Ottawa	Ottawa	66	17
Peterborough Victoria Northumberland and Clarington Catholic District School Board	Public Catholic	English	Peterborough	Kawartha Lakes, Northumberland, Peterborough, Durham (Clarington)	31	6
Renfrew County Catholic District School Board	Public Catholic	English	Pembroke	Renfrew	22	2
Simcoe Muskoka Catholic District School Board	Public Catholic	English	Barrie	Muskoka, Simcoe	41	9
St. Clair Catholic District School Board	Public Catholic	English	Wallaceburg	Chatham-Kent, Lambton	26	2
Sudbury Catholic District School Board	Public Catholic	English	Sudbury	Sudbury	17	4
Superior North Catholic District School Board	Public Catholic	English	Terrace Bay	Thunder Bay (Northern & Eastern)	9	0
Thunder Bay Catholic District School Board	Public Catholic	English	Thunder Bay	Thunder Bay	18	3
Toronto Catholic District School Board	Public Catholic	English	Toronto	Toronto	167	29
Waterloo Catholic District School Board	Public Catholic	English	Kitchener	Waterloo	46	6
Wellington Catholic District School Board	Public Catholic	English	Guelph	Wellington	17	4
Windsor-Essex Catholic District School Board	Public Catholic	English	Windsor	Essex	39	10
York Catholic District School Board	Public Catholic	English	Aurora	York	90	16
Conseil des écoles catholiques du Centre-Est	Public Catholic	French	Ottawa	Frontenac, Hastings, Lanark, Leeds/Grenville, Ottawa, Renfrew	50	10
Conseil scolaire catholique MonAvenir	Public Catholic	French	Toronto	Brant, Durham, Halton, Hamilton, Niagara, Peel, Peterborough, Simcoe, Toronto, Waterloo, Wellington, York	55	10
Conseil scolaire de district catholique de l'Est ontarien	Public Catholic	French	L'Orignal	Prescott/Russell, Stormont/Dundas/Glengarry	32	8
Conseil scolaire de district catholique des Aurores boréales	Public Catholic	French	Thunder Bay	Kenora, Thunder Bay	10	2
Conseil scolaire catholique de district des Grandes-Rivières	Public Catholic	French	Timmins	Cochrane, Timiskaming	34	11
Conseil scolaire catholique du Nouvel-Ontario	Public Catholic	French	Sudbury	Algoma, Manitoulin, Sudbury	29	10
Conseil scolaire catholique Franco-Nord	Public Catholic	French	North Bay	Nipissing	13	3
Conseil scolaire catholique Providence	Public Catholic	French	Windsor	Chatham-Kent, Essex, Grey, Lambton, Middlesex, Oxford	26	8
Penetanguishene Protestant Separate School Board	Public Protestant	English	Penetanguishene	Town of Penetanguishene	1	0
Bloorview School Authority	Public (Children's Treatment Centre)	English	Toronto	Toronto	1	0
Grandview School Authority	Public (Children's Treatment Centre)	English	Ajax	Durham (Ajax)	1	0
John McGivney Children's Centre School Authority	Public (Children's Treatment Centre)	English	Windsor	Essex	1	0
Niagara Peninsula Children's Centre School Authority	Public (Children's Treatment Centre)	English	St. Catharines	Niagara	1	0
Ottawa Children's Treatment Centre School Authority	Public (Children's Treatment Centre)	English	Ottawa	Ottawa	1	0
Provincial Schools Branch (Ontario Ministry of Education)	Public (Schools for Deaf, blind, deafblind, and/or severely learning disabled students)	English/French	Milton	Brant (Brantford), Halton (Milton), Middlesex (London), Ottawa	11	11
The KidsAbility School Authority	Public (Children's Treatment Centre)	English	Waterloo	Waterloo (Cambridge and Waterloo)	1	0

There is also the Ahkwesahsne Mohawk Board of Education, which includes parts of Ontario and Quebec. For high school education, AMBE agrees to pay tuition for high school students to UCDSB and CDSBEO.

== Former school districts ==
There were a number of schools governed by "school authorities," which managed schools in remote and sparsely populated regions. Effective September 1, 2009, 20 isolated school authorities were amalgamated with district school boards.

- Airy & Sabine District School Authority - merged with Renfrew County DSB
- Atikokan Roman Catholic Separate School Board, Atikokan - merged with Northwest CDSB
- Asquith-Garvey District School Authority, Shining Tree - merged with Rainbow DSB
- Caramat District School Area Board, Caramat - merged with Superior-Greenstone DSB
- Collins District School Area Board, Collins - merged with Lakehead DSB
- Connell and Ponsford District School Area Board, Pickle Lake - merged with Keewatin-Patricia DSB
- Conseil des écoles séparées catholiques de Dubreuilville, Dubreuilville - merged with CSDC du Nouvel-Ontario
- Conseil des écoles séparées catholiques de Foleyet, Foleyet - merged with CSDC des Grandes Rivières
- Foleyet District School Area Board, Foleyet - merged with DSB Ontario North East
- Foleyet Roman Catholic Separate School Board, Foleyet - merged with CSDC des Grandes Rivières
- Gogama District School Area Board, Gogama - merged with DSB Ontario North East
- Gogama Roman Catholic Separate School Board, Gogama
- Hornepayne Roman Catholic Separate School Board, Hornepayne - merged with Huron-Superior DSB and CDSC du Nouvel-Ontario
- Ignace Roman Catholic Separate School Board, Ignace- merged with CSDC des Aurores boréales
- Mine Centre District School Area Board, Mine Centre - merged with Rainy River DSB
- Missarenda District School Area Board, Missanabie - merged with Algoma DSB
- Moosonee Roman Catholic Separate School Board, Moosonee - merged with Northeastern CDSB and CDSC des Grande Rivières
- Murchison and Lyell District School Area Board, Madawaska - merged with Renfrew County DSB
- Nakina District School Area Board, Nakina - merged with Superior-Greenstone DSB
- Northern District School Area Board, Armstrong and Savant Lake - merged with Lakehead DSB and Keewatin-Patricia DSB
- Parry Sound Roman Catholic Separate School Board, Parry Sound - merged with Simcoe-Muskoka CDSB
- Red Lake Area Combined Roman Catholic Separate School Board, Red Lake - merged with Kenora Catholic DSB and CSDC des Aurores boréales
- Upsala District School Area Board, Upsala - merged with Keewatin-Patricia DSB

Prior to 1998, Ontario had 124 school districts within the province including the list above.

- Conseil des écoles françaises de la communauté urbaine de Toronto - merged into Conseil Scolaire de District du Centre-Sud-Ouest
- Conseil de la ville de Hamilton - merged into Conseil Scolaire de District du Centre-Sud-Ouest
- East York Board of Education - merged with the Toronto District School Board
- Etobicoke Board of Education - merged with the Toronto District School Board
- Metropolitan Separate School Board - split into the Toronto Catholic District School Board and Conseil scolaire de district catholique Centre-Sud
- North York Board of Education - merged with the Toronto District School Board
- Scarborough Board of Education - merged with the Toronto District School Board
- Toronto Board of Education - merged with the Toronto District School Board
- Board of Education for the City of York - merged with the Toronto District School Board
- York Region Roman Catholic Separate School Board - split into the York Catholic District School Board and Conseil scolaire de district catholique Centre-Sud

== School sections ==
From 1846 to the late 1800s schools were assigned to school districts or school sections. Instead of names for each school, they were assigned numbers, e.g. SS No 11.

== See also ==
- List of high schools in Ontario
- Education in Ontario
