= Keewatin-Patricia District School Board =

School board in Ontario, Canada

Keewatin-Patricia District School Board KPDSB

Location
- 4th Floor - 240 Veterans Drive, Kenora, Ontario Canada

District information
- Chair of the board: Cecile Marcino
- Director of education: Sherri-Lynne Pharand
- Schools: 20 total: 14 elementary, 4 secondary, 2 K-12
- District ID: B28045

Other information
- Website: www.kpdsb.ca

The Keewatin-Patricia District School Board (known as English-language Public District School Board No. 5A prior to 1999) oversees public education in the Kenora District of northwestern Ontario. Its jurisdiction includes a geographic area of 6,565 km^{2} from the Manitoba border to roughly the western tip of Lake Superior.

The KPDSB was formed in 1998 as a merger of the Kenora, Red Lake and Dryden school boards. The secular French schools in the county became part of the new Conseil scolaire de district du Grand Nord de l'Ontario.

The six high schools administered by the KPDSB are:

- Beaver Brae Secondary School in Kenora
- Crolancia Public School in Pickle Lake
- Dryden High School in Dryden
- Ignace High School in Ignace
- Sioux North High School - replaced Queen Elizabeth District High School in Sioux Lookout in 2014
- Red Lake District High School in Red Lake
- Keewatin Public-Kenora

== See also ==
- Kenora Catholic District School Board
- List of school districts in Ontario
- List of high schools in Ontario
