= Red Rock Folk Festival =

Annual music festival in Ontario, Canada

Live from the Rock Folk Festival, founded in 2003, is an outdoor multistage music festival located at Pull-a-log Park on the north shore of Lake Superior in Red Rock, Ontario. It takes place annually on the weekend following the civic holiday in August, drawing over 2,000 attendees each year. The festival is hosted by the Live from the Rock Blues & Folk Society but is run entirely by volunteers and supported financially through grants, corporate sponsorships, donations, and ticket sales.

The festival has attracted a number of notable Canadian folk artists, including Connie Kaldor, Ian Tamblyn, Lynn Miles, Matt Andersen, Dala, and The Wooden Sky, among others.
