= Conseil scolaire de district catholique Franco-Nord =

School board in Ontario, Canada

Conseil scolaire catholique Franco-Nord CSCFN

Location
- North Bay Nipissing District Canada

District information
- Superintendent: Éric Foisy Tina Legault-Ouellet
- Director of education: Serge Levac
- Schools: 14 Total (11 elementary, 3 secondary)

Other information
- Website: www.franco-nord.ca

Conseil scolaire catholique Franco-Nord is the Roman Catholic separate, French-language school board for Ontario District of Nipissing. It is headquartered in North Bay, and serves the communities of Mattawa, Bonfield, Astorville, Thorne, North Bay, Sturgeon Falls, River Valley and Verner. This school board has 14 schools in total, including 3 secondary schools.

== Elementary schools ==
- École élémentaire catholique Christ-Roi, River Valley
- École élémentaire catholique Saint-Joseph, Sturgeon Falls
- École élémentaire catholique Sainte-Anne, Mattawa
- École élémentaire catholique Saints-Anges, North Bay
- École élémentaire catholique La Résurrection, Sturgeon Falls
- École élémentaire catholique Lorrain, Bonfield
- École élémentaire catholique Mariale, Thorne
- École élémentaire catholique Saint-Raymond, North Bay
- École élémentaire catholique Saint-Thomas d'Aquin, Astorville
- École élémentaire catholique Saint-Vincent, North Bay
- École élémentaire catholique Sainte-Marguerite d'Youville, Verner

== Secondary schools ==
- École secondaire catholique Algonquin, North Bay
- École secondaire catholique Élisabeth-Bruyère, Mattawa
- École secondaire catholique Franco-Cité, Sturgeon Falls

== See also ==
- List of school districts in Ontario
- List of high schools in Ontario
