= Golden Giant Mine =

Gold mine in Ontario, Canada

Golden Giant
- Location in Ontario
- Location: Hemlo, Ontario, Canada; 48.00°41′N 85.00°54′W
- Production: Over 6 million
- Financial year: Through 21 years
- Opened: 1985
- Closed: 2006
- Company: Noranda (through Hemlo Gold Mines, Inc.); Battle Mountain Gold; Newmont Mining; Barrick Gold

The Golden Giant Mine is a closed underground gold mine in Northern Ontario, near the towns of Manitouwadge and Marathon. Along with the David Bell Mine and Williams Mine, it is part of the Hemlo mining camp. During their peak years, they represented over half of Ontario's and roughly a quarter of Canada's gold production.

== History ==
The presence of gold in the Hemlo area has been known since at least 1869. Exploration work began to pick up in the 1920s, but relatively poor findings and low gold prices precluded development; drilling done in 1951 missed the main Hemlo ore body by less than 30m.

Prospectors John Larche, Don McKinnon and Richard Hughes discovered gold in the Hemlo camp in the early 1980s, starting a staking rush not seen in Canada since the Klondike gold rush of the late 19th century; over 7,000 new claims were staked in the area by the end of 1982. Two companies, Golden Sceptre and Goliath Resources, secured rights to a large land package in the area, and were subsequently acquired by Noranda.

Noranda permitted and built the Golden Giant mine in less than two years. With its first pour in April 1985, the Golden Giant was the first mine in the camp to ship.

Peak production occurred in 1992, at just over 450,000 oz t. During its 21-year life, the mine produced over 7 million ounces of gold, as well as some 137,000 ounces of silver.

=== Ownership ===
Noranda formed Hemlo Gold Mines, Inc. to operate the mine. Hemlo merged with U.S.-producer Battle Mountain Gold in 1996, which was in turn acquired by Newmont Mining in 2001.

On September 22, 2010, Barrick Gold acquired the Golden Giant Mine Properties from Newmont.

== Geology ==
The grade of the ore is 0.36, in a host rock of quartz sericite schist.

== Operations ==
The mine produced 446,858 ounces in 1994 with fully automated ore flow.

The mine was designed as a 3000-dry-tonne-per-day operation. With the Block 5 expansion, the mine shaft reached a depth of more than 5000 feet.

Originally owned by Noranda, shaft sinking and development were started by Canadian Mine Enterprises and when that company went bankrupt during 1983 shaft sinking, lateral and raise development, as well as the initial production mining, employing long hole mining methods, were executed by MacIsaac Mining and Tunnelling.

The mill was a conventional leach-CIP circuit. The ore was crushed to 3/8" with standard- and short-head cone crushers. The crushed material was fed to one of two grinding circuits (A-circuit = 3 ball mills, B-circuit = single ball mill). A-circuit was one of the first in the world to include the fully automated Knelson (gravity) concentrator. A second unit was added to the B-Circuit around the year 2000. Concentrate from the Knelsons was upgraded with a shaking table. That unit was replaced with the first Acacia concentrator installed in North America.

After grinding, the ore was fed to the leach circuit where the gold was dissolved. Dissolved gold was recovered in the carbon-in-pulp circuit. Once or twice per week the carbon was treated in a 15-tonne pressure Zadra strip process. Gold was recovered from the pregnant solution on stainless steel wool cathodes in the refinery.

From 1996 onward, much of the tailings were returned to the mine as pastefill backfill.

=== Shutdown & reclamation ===
The mine ceased operation in 2005, and closed permanently in 2006. Remnant sales ended in the second quarter of 2007.

Gerrits Drilling & Engineering completed the installation of a number of Interceptor Wells from 2012 - 2014.

Reclamation work was ongoing as of 2017, with monitoring expected to continue until at least 2025.

== See also ==
- List of mines in Ontario
