= Penetanguishene Protestant Separate School Board =

School board in Ontario, Canada

The Protestant Separate School Board of the Town of Penetanguishene

Location
- 2 Poyntz Street, Unit 48, Box 107 Penetanguishene, ON, L9M 1M2, Canada Canada
- Coordinates: 44.7674°N 79.9332°W

District information
- Chair of the board: Lynne Cousens
- Schools: 1 elementary school (JK-8)
- Budget: CA$7,529,610 (September through August)

Other information
- Elected trustees: Greg Craftchick, Elizabeth DesRochers, Kyle Graham, April LeBlanc, Cathie Sindall, Lindsay Stewart
- Website: www.pssbp.ca

The Protestant Separate School Board of the Town of Penetanguishene (PSSBP, French: Conseil des écoles séparées protestantes de la ville de Penetanguishene) is a separate English-language school board headquartered in Penetanguishene, Ontario, Canada. The board consists of a single school, the Burkevale Protestant Separate School, serving grades JK through 8. The School Board is publicly-funded by the Province of Ontario's Ministry of Education.

== History ==
The board was founded in 1882.

The original school was built that same year, with an addition built in 1909. It was demolished in June 1965 to make way for its replacement.

The current school building was built in 1965.

== See also ==
- List of school districts in Ontario
- List of high schools in Ontario
