= Area code 807 =

Telephone area code for Northwestern Ontario

Coordinates: 50°N 90°W

Area code 807 is a telephone area code in the North American Numbering Plan (NANP) for the Canadian province of Ontario. The numbering plan area (NPA), comprising only Northwestern Ontario, was created in early 1962 in an area code split of NPA 705. The main reason for the split was not central office prefix exhaustion, but routing efficiency for calls from Western Canada to northwestern Ontario.

Major communities served by area code 807 include Thunder Bay, Kenora, Dryden, Fort Frances, Rainy River, Marathon, Manitouwadge, and Greenstone. The area is split between the Central and Eastern Time Zones.

The incumbent local exchange carriers in the numbering plan area are Tbaytel, Bell Canada, and Bell Aliant's Dryden Municipal Telephone Service.

The numbering plan area is one of the least populated in Canada. Fewer than 40% of its telephone numbers are in use and the Canadian Numbering Administration Consortium (CNAC) estimates that it will not be exhausted for many decades. In the turn of the 3rd millennium, as area code 705 neared exhaustion, the CNAC briefly considered "erasing" the 807-705 boundary and turning 807 into an overlay complex for all of Ontario north and west of the Golden Horseshoe. However, the potential for confusion advised against the implementation. As a result, 807 is the only area code in Ontario without an overlay, and hence the last one that used to allow seven-digit dialing. (The only other Canadian area code without an overlay is 867, used in the three northern territories.)

In August 2022, the Canadian Radio-television and Telecommunications Commission ordered a transition to the three-digit code 988 for suicide prevention resources. Although 988 is not in use as a local exchange prefix in area code 807, the CRTC mandated ten-digit local calling by 31 May 2023. The CRTC's decision followed the decision of the U.S. Federal Communications Commission to adopt 988 for the U.S. National Suicide Prevention Lifeline.

== Communities and central office prefixes ==
- Premium services: 1-807-976
- Armstrong: 583
- Atikokan: 207, 290, 324, 590, 594, 596, 597, 598, 770, 780, 781
- Balmertown: - See Red Lake
- Barwick: 487
- Beardmore: 875
- Bearskin Lake: 363
- Big Trout Lake: 537
- Caramat: 872
- Cat Lake: 347
- Clearwater Bay: 200, 733
- Cloud Bay: 964
- Cochenour: 662
- Deer Lake: 775
- Devlin: 486, 704, 907, 908
- Dorion: 857
- Dryden: 212, 215, 216, 217, 220, 221, 223, 265, 322, 323, 995
- Eagle River: 755
- Ear Falls: 222
- Emo: 482
- Flanders: 947
- Fort Frances: 208, 270, 271, 272, 274, 275, 276, 277, 703, 788, 789, 798, 861, 994
- Fort Hope: 242
- Fort Severn: 478
- Geraldton: 209, 790, 806, 853, 854, 855, 858, 863
- Grassy Narrows: 925
- Gull Bay First Nation: 982
- Hemlo: 238
- Hornepayne: 379, 868
- Hudson: 582, 702, 808, 809
- Ignace: 747, 934, 936
- Jellicoe: 879
- Kaministiquia: 933
- Kasabonika: 535
- Kenora: 219, 255, 388, 389, 390, 391, 392, 393, 394, 395, 396, 397, 407, 444, 456, 463, 464, 465, 466, 467, 468, 512, 513, 514, 547, 548, 549, 842
- Kingfisher Lake: 532
- Lac La Croix First Nation: 485
- Lansdowne House: 479
- Longlac: 810, 876
- Macdiarmid: 885
- Madsen: - See Red Lake
- Manitouwadge: 378, 826, 827
- Marathon: 213, 228, 229, 230, 231, 232, 292, 371, 500, 787
- McKenzie Island: - See Red Lake
- McKenzie Portage: 201, 543
- Morson: 488
- Muskrat Dam: 471
- Minaki: 224
- Mine Centre: 599
- Nakina: 329
- Nestor Falls: 484
- Nibinamik First Nation: (Summer Beaver) 593
- Nicikousemenecaning First Nation: (Bears Passage) 481
- Nipigon: 236, 293, 372, 712, 713, 880, 887, 888, 889
- Ogoki: 349
- Oxdrift: 203, 937
- Pass Lake: 977
- Perrault Falls: 205, 529
- Pickle Lake: 928
- Pikangikum: 773
- Poplar Hill: 772
- Rainy River: 360, 852
- Raith: 448
- Red Rock: 294, 886
- Red Lake: 237, 335, 726, 727, 728, 729, 735, 749
- Redditt: 225
- Sachigo Lake First Nation: 595
- Sandy Lake: 771, 774, 776
- Sapawe: 929
- Savant Lake: 584
- Schreiber: 373, 824, 825
- Shebandowan: 926
- Sioux Lookout: 214, 233, 239, 240, 374, 737, 738
- Sioux Narrows: 226
- Starratt Olsen: - See Red Lake
- Stratton: 483
- Terrace Bay: 296, 375, 821, 823, 825
- Thunder Bay: 234, 235, 251, 252, 285, 286, 317, 333, 343, 344, 345, 346, 355, 356, 357, 358, 472, 473, 474, 475, 476, 577, 619, 620, 621, 622, 623, 624, 625, 626, 627, 628, 629, 630, 631, 632, 633, 683, 684, 695, 696, 697, 698, 699, 700, 701, 706, 707, 708, 709, 766, 767, 768, 777, 867, 935, 939, 957, 983, 999
- Upsala: 985, 986
- Vermilion Bay: 206, 227
- Wabaseemoong Independent Nations: (Whitedog) 927
- Wabigoon First Nation: 938, 943
- Weagamow First Nation: 469
- Webequie First Nation: 353
- White River: 297, 822
- Wunnumin Lake First Nation: 442

== See also ==
- List of Ontario area codes
- List of North American Numbering Plan area codes

Ontario area codes: 416/437/647/942, 519/226/548/382, 613/343/753, 705/249/683, 807, 905/289/365/742
	North: 867	
West: 204/431	807	East: 249/705
	South: 218, 906	
Yukon, Northwest Territories and Nunavut area codes: 867
Manitoba area codes: 204/431/584
Michigan area codes: 231, 248/947, 269, 313, 517, 586, 616, 734, 810, 906, 989
Minnesota area codes: 218, 320, 507/924, 612, 651, 763, 952
