= Nipissing-Parry Sound Catholic District School Board =

School board in central Ontario, Canada

Location
- 1000 High Street; North Bay, Ontario; P1B 6S6 North Bay, West Nipissing, Powassan, Mattawa, and Callander Canada

District information
- Superintendents: Jody Weller, Audrey Gribbons, Derek Belanger, Grace Barnhardt
- Chair of the board: Shawn Fitzsimmons
- Schools: 11 elementary 1 secondary 1 Student Success/St. Joseph Adult Education
- Budget: CA$55 million
- District ID: B29017

Students and staff
- Students: 3100

Other information
- Director of Education: Paula Mann
- Elected trustees: John Willemsen; Shelly Warren; Leo de Jourdan; Jacques Bégin; Shawn Fitzsimmons; David Dunkley; Mike Sawyer
- Website: www.npsc.ca

The Nipissing-Parry Sound Catholic District School Board (known as English-language Separate District School Board No. 30B prior to 1999) administers separate school Catholic education for an area of 11,653 km^{2} (4,499 sq mi) in central Ontario, Canada. Its headquarters are in North Bay.

== History ==
St. Joseph-Scollard Hall (SJSH) was created in 1985 through the merger of Scollard Hall (boys) and St. Joseph/St. Mary's Academy (girls). The teachers today are mostly Catholic men and women, many of whom were former students of the schools.

== Schools ==
The board manages 11 elementary schools, one secondary school, and one adult learning centre.

=== Elementary schools ===
- Holy Cross Catholic Elementary School, North Bay
- Mother St. Bride Catholic Elementary School, North Bay
- Our Lady of Fatima Catholic Elementary School, North Bay
- Our Lady of Sorrows Catholic Elementary School, Sturgeon Falls
- St. Alexander Catholic Elementary School, North Bay
- St. Francis Catholic Elementary School, North Bay
- St. Gregory Catholic Elementary School, Powassan
- St. Hubert Catholic Elementary School, North Bay
- St. Luke Catholic Elementary School, North Bay
- St. Theresa Catholic Elementary School, Callander
- St. Victor Catholic Elementary School, Mattawa

=== Secondary school ===
- St. Joseph-Scollard Hall Catholic Secondary School, North Bay

=== Adult education centres ===
- St. Joseph Adult Education, North Bay

== See also ==
- List of school districts in Ontario
- List of high schools in Ontario
