= Kenora Catholic District School Board =

School board in Ontario, Canada

Kenora Catholic DSB

Location
- 1292 Heenan Place; Kenora, ON; P9N 2Y8 Canada

District information
- Superintendent: Alison Smith, Superintendent of Business Services Jamey Robertson, Superintendent of Education
- Director of education: Nicole Kurtz
- Schools: 4 elementary 1 secondary
- District ID: B29050

Students and staff
- Students: 1,355

Other information
- Website: www.kcdsb.on.ca

Kenora Catholic District School Board (KCDSB, known as English-language Separate District School Board No. 33B prior to 1999) is a separate school system serving the Kenora District in Ontario. The Kenora Catholic District School Board oversees educational programming for three elementary schools and one secondary school in Kenora and one elementary school in Red Lake. It is the only school board west of Thunder Bay with a dual track French Immersion system from Junior Kindergarten through to grade 12. They also provide Native Language classes at all grade levels.

== Schools ==
The board administers the following schools:

School name	City/Town	Students	School type
St. Louis School	Kenora	125	Elementary
St. John Paul II School	Kenora	230	Elementary
École Ste-Marguerite Bourgeoys	Kenora	250	French Immersion Elementary
St. John School	Red Lake	140	Elementary
St. Thomas Aquinas High School	Kenora	610	Secondary

== See also ==
- List of school districts in Ontario
- List of high schools in Ontario
