= Longlac =

- Unincorporated community
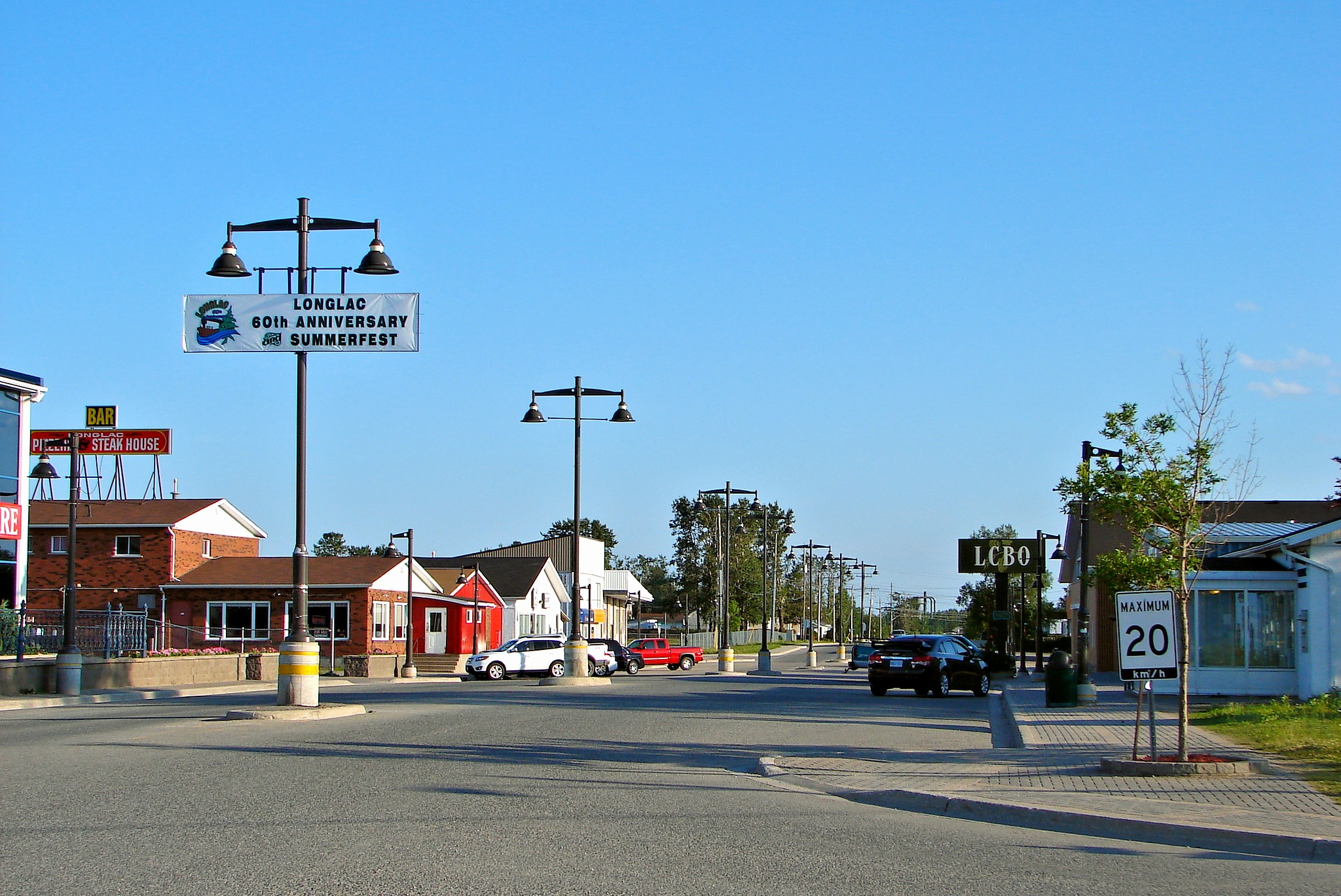

- Location within Ontario
- Coordinates: 49°46′47″N 86°32′14″W
- Country: Canada
- Province: Ontario
- District: Thunder Bay
- Municipality: Greenstone
- Improvement District: 1952
- Township: 1964
- Dissolved (amalgamated): 2001
- Named for: Long Lake

Area
  - Land: 1.74 km^{2} (0.67 sq mi)

Population (2021)
  - Total: 1,316
  - Density: 756.7/km^{2} (1,960/sq mi)
- Time zone: UTC-5 (EST)
  - Summer (DST): UTC-4 (EDT)
- Postal code: P0T 2A0
- Area code: 807

Longlac is a community in the municipality of Greenstone, in northwestern Ontario, Canada. It is located along Highway 11 and the Canadian National Railway, on the namesake Longlac Bay at the northern end of Long Lake.

It was a separate municipality from 1964 to 2001, when it was amalgamated with the former Townships of Beardmore and Nakina, and the Town of Geraldton.

== History ==
Aerial view of Longlac

The area has long been inhabited by Anishinaabe peoples. French traders explored the Long Lake area in the 17th century and set up a post. The Hudson's Bay Company (HBC) explored the area from 1776 on. Circa 1800, the North West Company (NWC) built a trading post on Long Lake near its outlet of Kenogami River, possibly the former site of a French post. In 1814, HBC established a rival post nearby at Gauthier Point, which was an outpost falling under Henley House, but became a full trading post the following year. In 1819, Henley House was destroyed and Long Lake became district headquarters, until it closed in 1821 (when the HBC and NWC merged). It soon reopened as an outpost of the Pic River post, and served as a relay post for the winter express route between Red River and Moose Factory in the succeeding years.

In the early 20th century, other trading posts opened at Long Lake, including Révillon Frères (1906–1919), Mathe & Duphney, and Great Lake Fur Trading Company (both in operation circa 1918).

In the 1910s, the Canadian Northern Railway was built along the north end of Long Lake and opened for passenger service in 1915. Since the name "Long Lake" was already in use elsewhere, the French equivalent "Longuelac" was chosen as the station's name (which later became Longlac).

In 1921, HBC moved its post from the nearby Gauthier Point to a site near the railroad station. In 1923, the Longlac-Nakina Cut-Off was built, connecting the Canadian Northern Railway at Longlac to the National Transcontinental Railway at Nakina, which gave Longlac greater importance as a railway junction. A new station was built to the west at the actual junction, and the old station was renamed "Calong" (a modification of Longlac).

In 1937, a pulp and paper mill opened in Longlac, and in 1942, the highway to Geraldton was built. In 1952, the place was incorporated as the Improvement District of Longlac. In 1957, the mill was taken over by Kimberly-Clark.

In 1959, the HBC operations were transferred to the Northern Stores Department. HBC divested this department in 1987 to The North West Company, and the store subsequently closed.

In 1964, the Improvement District became the Township of Longlac, which in turn changed statutes in 1982 to become the Town of Longlac.

In 2001, Longlac was amalgamated with the former Townships of Beardmore and Nakina, and the Town of Geraldton, together with previously unorganized areas, into the new municipality of Greenstone.

Railroad traffic from Longlac to Thunder Bay gradually declined, and this section was abandoned in 2005 and the rails were removed in 2010. The station was moved back to its original location, which is serviced by Via Rail.

== Demographics ==
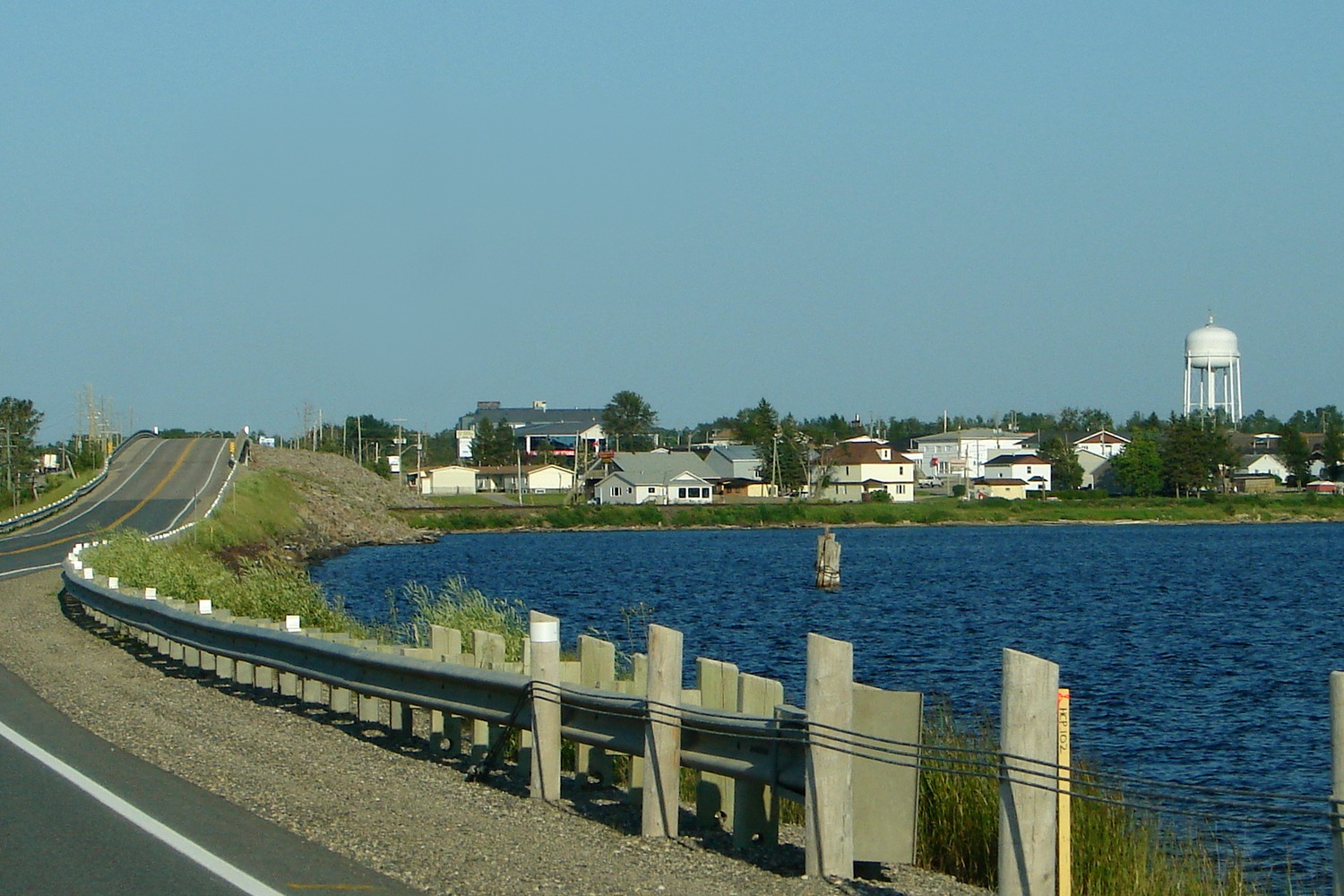
Longlac, as seen from across Longlac Bay of Long Lake

Historical census populations – Longlac

Year	Pop.	±%
1956	866	—
1961	1,144	+32.1%
1966	1,322	+15.6%
1971	1,484	+12.3%
1976	1,934	+30.3%
1981	2,431	+25.7%
1986	2,339	−3.8%

Year	Pop.	±%
1991	2,073	−11.4%
1996	2,074	+0.0%
2001	1,748	−15.7%
2006	1,364	−22.0%
2011	1,383	+1.4%
2016	1,434	+3.7%
2021	1,316	−8.2%

Population counts are not adjusted for boundary changes.
Source: Statistics Canada

Private dwellings occupied by usual residents (2021): 562 (total dwellings: 650)

Mother tongue (2021):

- English as first language: 64.4%
- French as first language: 29.2%
- English and French as first language: 3.0%
- Other as first language: 1.9%

== Transportation ==
Longlac is located along the Trans-Canada Highway 11. It is also accessible by Via Rail service at the Longlac train station.

Preceding station	Via Rail	Following station
Nakina toward Vancouver	The Canadian	Caramat toward Toronto
Former services
Preceding station	Canadian National Railway	Following station
Bawk toward Vancouver	Main Line	Pagwachuan toward Montreal

== Notable people ==
- Bryan Burgess - curler
- Tyler Tucker - NHL ice hockey player, who played minor junior hockey in Longlac
