= Dorion, Ontario =

Dorion
- Township (single-tier)
- Township of Dorion
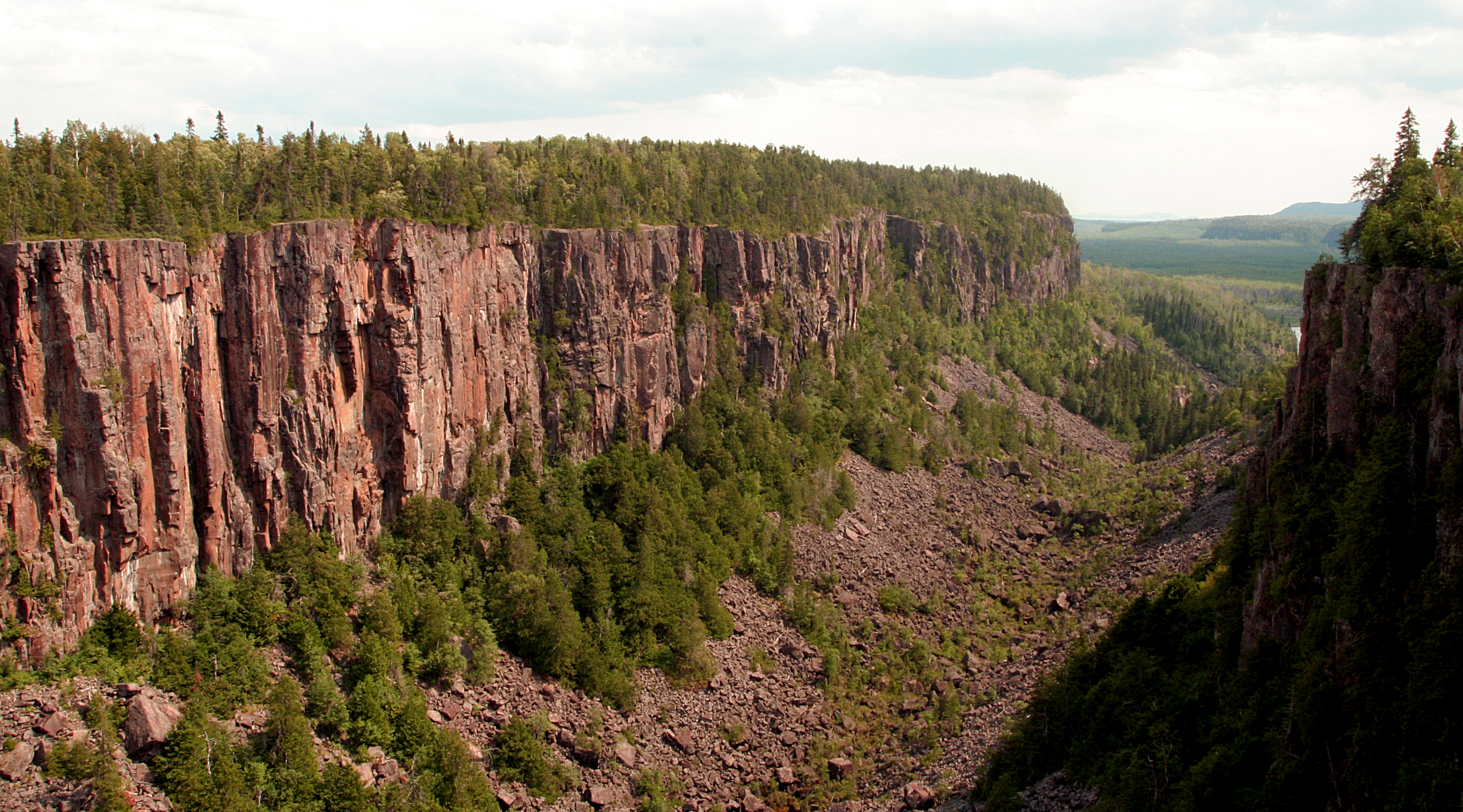
- Ouimet Canyon

- Location within Ontario
- Coordinates: 48°47′N 88°36′W
- Country: Canada
- Province: Ontario
- District: Thunder Bay
- Settled: 1893
- Incorporated: 1969

Government
  - Reeve: Robert Beatty
  - Fed. riding: Thunder Bay—Superior North
  - Prov. riding: Thunder Bay—Superior North

Area
  - Land: 211.25 km^{2} (81.56 sq mi)

Population (2021)
  - Total: 375
  - Density: 1.8/km^{2} (4.7/sq mi)
- Time zone: UTC-5 (EST)
  - Summer (DST): UTC-4 (EDT)
- Postal Code FSA: P0T 1K0
- Area code: 807 (857 exchange)
- Website: www.doriontownship.ca

Dorion is a township in the Canadian province of Ontario, located within the Thunder Bay District. The township had a population of 375 in the 2021 Canadian census.

The township is home to Ouimet Canyon, Eagle Canyon (with Canada's longest foot suspension bridge), and Hurkett Cove Conservation Area.

The township contains the namesake community of Dorion (48°47′40″N 88°32′29″W) as well as Dorion Landing (48°46′59″N 88°31′43″W).

== History ==
In the 1880s, the Canadian Pacific Railway was built through the area, and the township opened for settlement in 1893, with John Stewart as its first settler. In 1904, the first school was built, followed by the Dorion Post Office in 1906. By 1911, the population had reached 216 people, up from just 21 in 1901. In 1922, the road to Lakehead (now Thunder Bay) was opened. Electrical service came in the 1940s.

In 1951, the Improvement District of Dorion was established. In 1960, telephone service was installed in Dorion. In 1969, the Improvement District was incorporated as the Township of Dorion. In 1996, cell phone service became possible in Dorion.

== Demographics ==
In the 2021 Census of Population conducted by Statistics Canada, Dorion had a population of 375 living in 160 of its 176 total private dwellings, a change of 18.7% from its 2016 population of 316. With a land area of 211.25 km^{2} (81.56 sq mi), it had a population density of 1.8/km^{2} (4.6/sq mi) in 2021.

Canada census – Dorion community profile

	2021	2016	2011
Population	375 (+18.7% from 2016)	316 (-6.5% from 2011)	338 (-10.8% from 2006)
Land area	211.25 km^{2} (81.56 sq mi)	212.11 km^{2} (81.90 sq mi)	212.12 km^{2} (81.90 sq mi)
Population density	1.8/km^{2} (4.7/sq mi)	1.5/km^{2} (3.9/sq mi)	1.6/km^{2} (4.1/sq mi)
Median age	56.4 (M: 57.6, F: 56.0)	52.0 (M: 50.9, F: 52.1)
Private dwellings	176 (total) 160 (occupied)	174 (total)	154 (total)
Median household income	$91,000	$79,360

References: 2021 2016 2011

Historical census populations - Dorion, Ontario

Year	Pop.	±%
1951	440	—
1956	474	+7.7%
1961	557	+17.5%
1966	494	−11.3%
1971	506	+2.4%

Year	Pop.	±%
1976	486	−4.0%
1981	478	−1.6%
1986	514	+7.5%
1991	513	−0.2%
1996	472	−8.0%

Year	Pop.	±%
2001	442	−6.4%
2006	379	−14.3%
2011	338	−10.8%
2016	316	−6.5%
2021	375	+18.7%

Source: Statistics Canada

== See also ==
- List of francophone communities in Ontario
- List of townships in Ontario
