= Manitouwadge =

- Township (single-tier)
- Township of Manitouwadge
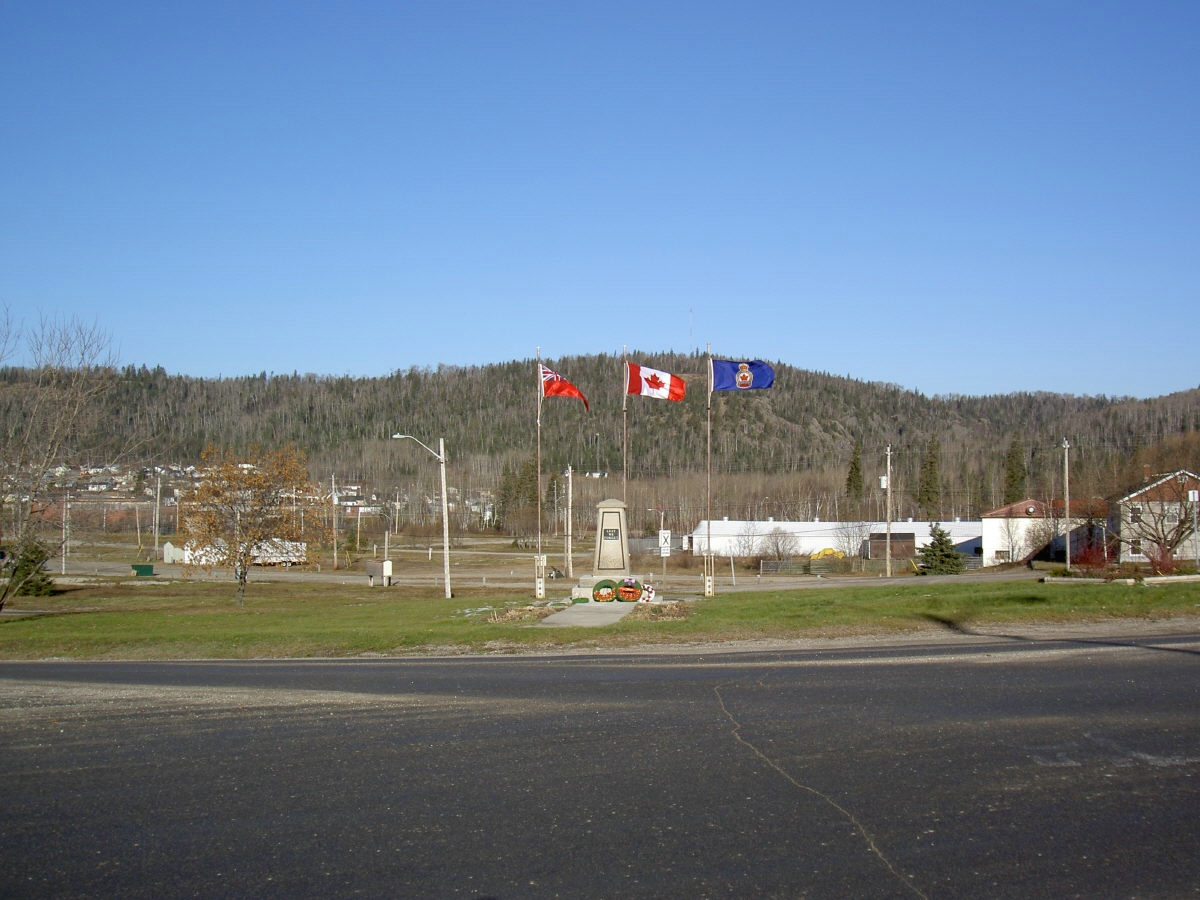

- Location within Ontario
- Coordinates: 49°08′N 85°50′W
- Country: Canada
- Province: Ontario
- District: Thunder Bay
- Settled: after 1953
- Improvement District: 1954
- Incorporated: 1975

Government
  - Type: Township
  - Mayor: Jim Moffat
  - Fed. riding: Thunder Bay-Superior North
  - Prov. riding: Algoma—Manitoulin

Area
  - Land: 352.17 km^{2} (135.97 sq mi)
  - Urban: 2.35 km^{2} (0.91 sq mi)
- Elevation: 332.20 m (1,089.9 ft)

Population (2021)
  - Total: 1,974
  - Density: 5.6/km^{2} (15/sq mi)
  - Urban: 1,682
  - Urban density: 715.5/km^{2} (1,853/sq mi)
- Time zone: UTC-5 (EST)
  - Summer (DST): UTC-4 (EDT)
- Postal Code: P0T 2C0
- Area code: 807 (826 exchange)
- Website: www.manitouwadge.ca

Manitouwadge is a township in the Canadian province of Ontario. It is located in the Thunder Bay District, at the north end of Highway 614, 331 kilometres (206 mi) east of Thunder Bay and 378 kilometres (235 mi) north-west of Sault Ste. Marie.

== History ==
Manitouwadge (Manidoowaazh in Ojibwe, meaning "Cave of the Great Spirit") is part of the wide-ranging territory of the Ojibwe people. The town itself was founded by General Engineering Co Limited (later Noranda; now part of Xstrata) after staking claims in 1953 in support of a copper mine. The other mine in Manitouwadge is the Willroy mine, named after two of the "Weekend Prospectors" William Dawidowich and Roy Barker. Full production at Geco and Willroy began in 1957.

From 1954 to 1974 Manitouwadge was classified as an Improvement District. The community became an incorporated township in 1975.

In the early 1980s, gold was discovered at Hemlo, near the intersection of highways 614 and 17, about 50 kilometres (31 mi) south of the town. Noranda acquired the mining rights to a significant portion of the ground in that area, and built the Golden Giant Mine. It offered housing in Manitouwadge to many of the employees of the new mine, and the town boomed.

When the Geco mine closed in 1995, Manitouwadge's population decreased significantly. After peaking at nearly 4000 people in the early 1990s, it decreased to less than 3000 by 2001. With the closing of the Golden Giant Mine in 2006, the population dropped to 2,100 by 2011.

== Geography ==
The township includes the four geographic townships of Mapledoram, Leslie, Gemmel, and Gertrude. The population centre itself is located on the southwestern shore of Lake Manitouwadge.

=== Climate ===
Manitouwadge has a humid continental climate (Dfb) bordering on a subarctic climate (Dfc), typical in Northern Ontario. Summers are generally warm and rainy with cool nights. Winters are typically very cold and very snowy. Winter usually begins mid November and lasts into April.

Climate data for Manitouwadge
Month	Jan	Feb	Mar	Apr	May	Jun	Jul	Aug	Sep	Oct	Nov	Dec	Year
Record high °C (°F)	5 (41)	8.9 (48.0)	19 (66)	28.5 (83.3)	35 (95)	39 (102)	39.4 (102.9)	34 (93)	30.6 (87.1)	25 (77)	18.3 (64.9)	12.5 (54.5)	39.4 (102.9)
Mean daily maximum °C (°F)	−11.4 (11.5)	−8.3 (17.1)	−1.1 (30.0)	7.6 (45.7)	16.4 (61.5)	21.2 (70.2)	23.9 (75.0)	22.2 (72.0)	15.1 (59.2)	7.7 (45.9)	−0.7 (30.7)	−8.5 (16.7)	7 (45)
Daily mean °C (°F)	−17.1 (1.2)	−14.5 (5.9)	−7.5 (18.5)	1.3 (34.3)	9.7 (49.5)	14.6 (58.3)	17.5 (63.5)	16.2 (61.2)	10.2 (50.4)	3.9 (39.0)	−4.2 (24.4)	−13.4 (7.9)	1.4 (34.5)
Mean daily minimum °C (°F)	−22.8 (−9.0)	−20.7 (−5.3)	−13.9 (7.0)	−5 (23)	2.9 (37.2)	8 (46)	11.1 (52.0)	10.2 (50.4)	5.3 (41.5)	0 (32)	−7.7 (18.1)	−18.2 (−0.8)	−4.2 (24.4)
Record low °C (°F)	−45 (−49)	−42.2 (−44.0)	−37.5 (−35.5)	−30 (−22)	−13.3 (8.1)	−2.8 (27.0)	−1.1 (30.0)	−1.1 (30.0)	−6.1 (21.0)	−14.5 (5.9)	−33.9 (−29.0)	−38.9 (−38.0)	−45 (−49)
Average precipitation mm (inches)	64.4 (2.54)	43.7 (1.72)	48.5 (1.91)	44 (1.7)	66.4 (2.61)	80.8 (3.18)	107.4 (4.23)	81.9 (3.22)	104.1 (4.10)	81.3 (3.20)	73.5 (2.89)	63.2 (2.49)	859.2 (33.83)
Average rainfall mm (inches)	0.2 (0.01)	2.1 (0.08)	9 (0.4)	26.5 (1.04)	62.6 (2.46)	80.8 (3.18)	107.4 (4.23)	81.9 (3.22)	101.9 (4.01)	66.6 (2.62)	22.1 (0.87)	2.6 (0.10)	563.6 (22.19)
Average snowfall cm (inches)	64.2 (25.3)	41.6 (16.4)	39.5 (15.6)	17.4 (6.9)	3.9 (1.5)	0 (0)	0 (0)	0 (0)	2.2 (0.9)	14.7 (5.8)	51.5 (20.3)	60.6 (23.9)	295.6 (116.4)
Source: Environment Canada

== Demographics ==
In the 2021 Census of Population conducted by Statistics Canada, Manitouwadge had a population of 1,974, a change of 1.9% from its 2016 population of 1,937. With a land area of 352.17 km^{2} (135.97 sq mi), it had a population density of 5.6/km^{2} (14.5/sq mi) in 2021.

Canada census – Manitouwadge community profile

	2021	2016	2011
Population	1,974 (+1.9% from 2016)	1,937 (-8.0% from 2011)	2,105 (-8.5% from 2006)
Land area	352.17 km^{2} (135.97 sq mi)	352.07 km^{2} (135.93 sq mi)	352.06 km^{2} (135.93 sq mi)
Population density	5.6/km^{2} (15/sq mi)	5.5/km^{2} (14/sq mi)	6.0/km^{2} (16/sq mi)
Median age	49.2 (M: 48.8, F: 50.0)	50.3 (M: 49.5, F: 51.1)
Private dwellings	1,059 (total) 920 (occupied)	1,082 (total)	1,129 (total)
Median household income	$70,500	$66,048

References: 2021 2016 2011

Historical census populations – Manitouwadge, Ontario

Year	Pop.	±%
1956	877	—
1961	2,635	+200.5%
1966	3,132	+18.9%
1971	3,340	+6.6%
1976	3,551	+6.3%
1981	3,183	−10.4%
1986	3,522	+10.7%

Year	Pop.	±%
1991	3,972	+12.8%
1996	3,395	−14.5%
2001	2,949	−13.1%
2006	2,300	−22.0%
2011	2,105	−8.5%
2016	1,937	−8.0%
2021	1,974	+1.9%

Source: Statistics Canada

== Economy ==
While mining has always been at the forefront of the economic activity of Manitouwadge, forestry also plays a significant part in the Town's economy. The town is currently seeking new industry and residents and offers some of the lowest housing and commercial property prices in Ontario. The Township boasts year-round outdoor recreation including a 10-run ski hill; snowmobile trails; excellent summer and winter fishing; kilometers of ATV trails, canoe and kayak routes.

== Recreation ==
=== Hiking and skiing ===
Trails for hiking in the summer and trails for snowmobilers in the winter are also abundant. Thirteen runs for downhill skiing are present at the Kiwissa Ski Club, as well as two locations with cross country ski trails managed by the Northern Trails Ski Club. From the top of the Kiwissa Ski Hill, the whole town is visible.

== Transportation ==
Manitouwadge is accessible via Highway 614 which connects to Highway 17 at Hemlo about 54 kilometres (34 mi) to the south.

Manitouwadge Municipal Aerodrome (ICAO airport code: CYMG) is available for small aircraft, such as fire protection, air ambulance, chartered flights, and private aircraft. It has one 3,600 ft (1,100 m) long asphalt runway.

== See also ==
- List of townships in Ontario
- List of francophone communities in Ontario
