= Nakina, Ontario =

Nakina
- Unincorporated community
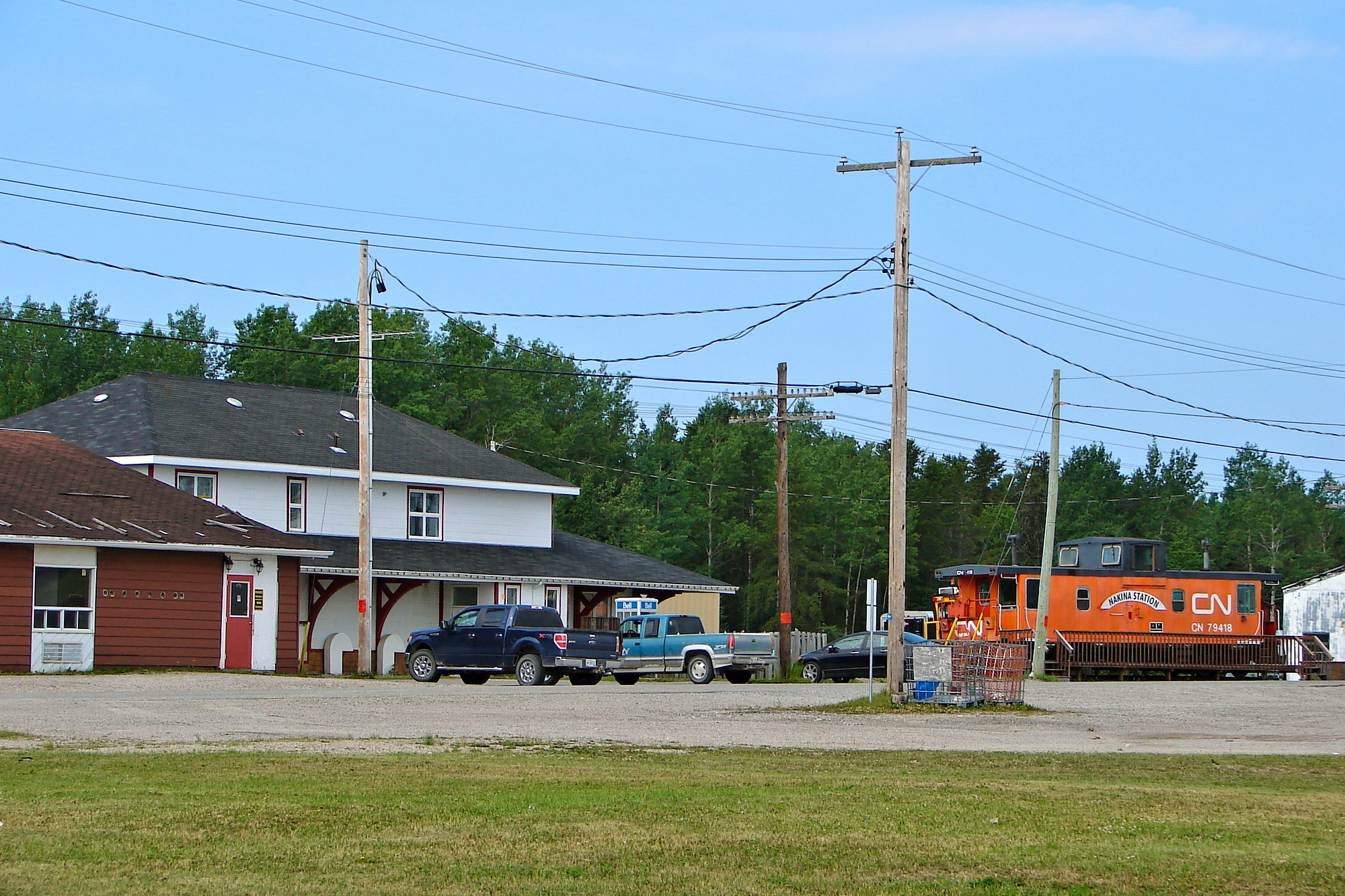

- Location within Ontario
- Coordinates: 50°10′44″N 86°42′36″W
- Country: Canada
- Province: Ontario
- District: Thunder Bay
- Municipality: Greenstone
- Established: 1913
- Incorporated (Township): 1978
- Dissolved (amalgamated): 2001
- Elevation: 311 m (1,021 ft)

Population
  - Total: 500
- Time zone: UTC-5 (EST)
  - Summer (DST): UTC-4 (EDT)
- Postal code: P0T 2H0
- Area code: 807

Nakina is a community in the Town of Greenstone in the Thunder Bay District in Northern Ontario, Canada. It is approximately 60 kilometres (37 mi) north of Geraldton, located along the Canadian National Railway. The origins of the town were initially support of the railway, but its economy has evolved through lumber, pulp and paper, mining and tourism. It has a population of about 500 people.

It was a separate municipality from 1978 until 2001, when it was amalgamated with the former Township of Beardmore, and the Towns of Geraldton and Longlac. Its name is an indigenous word meaning "meeting place".

== History ==
Nakina was first established in 1913 as flag stop on the National Transcontinental Railway (NTR), between the divisional points of Grant and Armstrong. Nakina was at Mile 15.9 of the NTR's Grant Sub-Division.

After the NTR was nationalized into the Canadian National Railway (CNR) in 1923, the CNR decided to create a "shortcut" between the tracks of the Canadian Northern Railway at Longlac to the National Transcontinental Railway at Nakina (called the Longlac-Nakina Cut-Off), which would reduce travel time by 4 hours. This prompted the development of the town, since Nakina replaced Grant (25 kilometers to the east) as the new divisional point. A repair and refueling complex, including a new large 2-storey station, was built at Nakina. The entire town of Grant was moved by flatcars to the new Nakina town site, including a store house, the 12-stall round house with machine shop and 75' turntable, 200-ton coal plant, 1,000-ton ice house, 70,000-gallon water tank, and staff resthouse. The community was briefly renamed Thornton Junction, after Henry Worth Thornton, then president of the CNR.

From the 1920s on, Nakina prospered as an important railway service stop.

During World War II, there was also a radar base on the edge of the town, intended to watch for a potential attacks on the strategically important locks at Sault Ste. Marie between Lake Superior and Lake Huron. Research into the radar site in the National Archives of Canada indicates that it was largely a United States Army Air Forces operation, that pre-dated the later Pinetree Line radar bases that were erected shortly thereafter focussing on the cold-war threat. The Nakina base was totally removed shortly after the war.

In 1955, the road from Geraldton to Nakina was built, connecting it with the Trans-Canada Highway.

The introduction of diesel locomotives after World War II meant that service and maintenance could be consolidated at points much more distant from one another than had been common in the first half of the 20th century. As a result, the value of Nakina as a railway service community greatly diminished. In 1958, the last steam engine left Nakina. Railway shops closed in the 1960s, and its status as a maintenance centre ended in 1986, when trains would no longer stop to change crews. That same year Nakina ceased to be a station stop.

In the 1970s, pulp and paper operations near the town offset the decline in railway employment. In 1978, the place was incorporated as the Township of Nakina and had a peak population of nearly 1000 in the 1981 census.

In 2001, Nakina was amalgamated with the former Township of Beardmore and the Towns of Geraldton and Longlac, together with previously unorganized areas, into the new municipality of Greenstone.

== Demographics ==
Historical census populations – Nakina, Ontario

Year	Pop.	±%
1961	892	—
1966	671	−24.8%
1971	667	−0.6%
1976	620	−7.0%
1981	977	+57.6%

Year	Pop.	±%
1986	900	−7.9%
1991	635	−29.4%
1996	566	−10.9%
2001	645	+14.0%

Population counts are for Improvement District of Nakina and Township of Nakina; not adjusted for boundary changes.
Source: Statistics Canada

== Economy ==
In March 2018, The North West Company shuttered the town's Northern Store branch, deeming it no longer financially sustainable. This closure represented the loss of the last major retail outlet in Nakina.

As of 2024, the town remains focused on tourism, diminished pulp and paper operations, and support of other more northern communities (food, fuel and transportation). Mining and minerals industries are seen as a possible source of further growth, including via a potential all-season road link to the Ring of Fire mining project.

== Transportation ==
Access to the remote northern community is via Highway 584 from Highway 11 at Geraldton.

Nakina is served by Via Rail's The Canadian train. and by charter flights at the Nakina Airport. Nakina Water Aerodrome is just north of the community on Cordingley Lake, where a float plane service provides transport to a variety of different lakes.

Preceding station	Via Rail	Following station
Auden toward Vancouver	The Canadian	Longlac toward Toronto
