= Greenstone, Ontario =

Greenstone
- Municipality (single-tier)
- Municipality of Greenstone
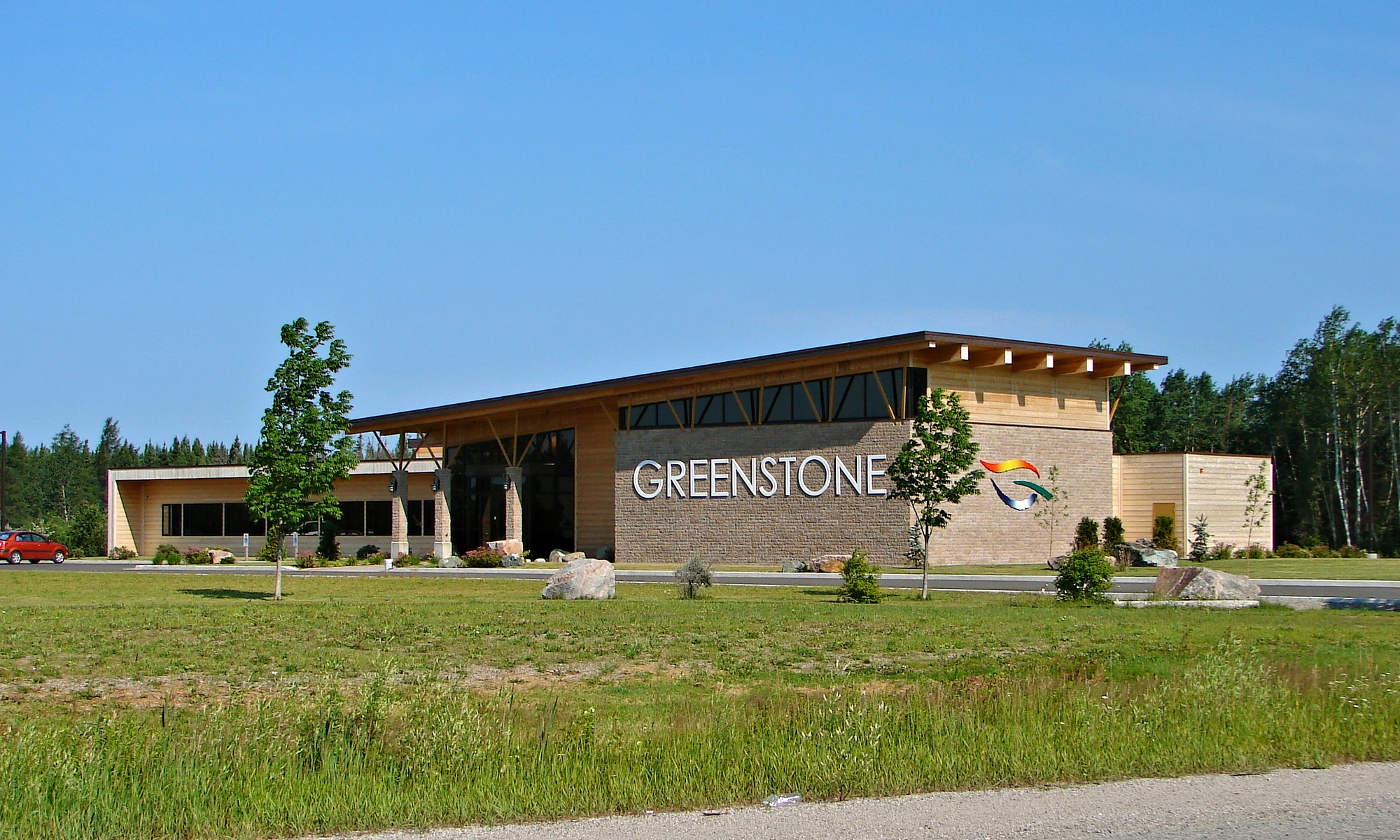
- Administration Office of Greenstone in Geraldton

- Flag
- Motto: "Nature's Home Town"
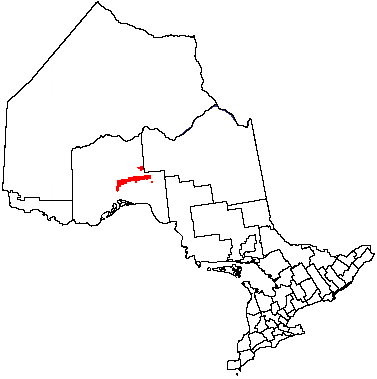
- Coordinates: 49°43′30.7″N 86°57′05″W
- Country: Canada
- Province: Ontario
- District: Thunder Bay
- Formed: 1 January 2001

Government
  - Mayor: James McPherson
  - Fed. riding: Thunder Bay—Superior North
  - Prov. riding: Thunder Bay—Superior North

Area
  - Land: 2,727.04 km^{2} (1,052.92 sq mi)
- Elevation: 348.40 m (1,143.0 ft)

Population (2016)
  - Total: 4,309
  - Density: 1.6/km^{2} (4.1/sq mi)
- Time zone: UTC−05:00 (EST)
  - Summer (DST): UTC−04:00 (EDT)
- Postal code FSA: P0T
- Area code: 807
- Website: www.greenstone.ca

Greenstone is a single-tier municipality in the Canadian province of Ontario with a population of 4,309 according to the 2021 Canadian census. It stretches along Highway 11 from Lake Nipigon to Longlac and covers 2,767.19 km^{2} (1,068.42 sq mi).

The town was formed on 1 January 2001, as part of municipal re-organization under the Progressive Conservative government of Ontario. It combined the former Townships of Beardmore and Nakina, the Towns of Geraldton and Longlac with large unincorporated portions of Unorganized Thunder Bay District.

It is the administrative office of the band government for the Animbiigoo Zaagi'igan Anishinaabek First Nation.

== Geography ==
=== Communities ===
Greenstone includes the communities of:

- Beardmore
- Caramat
- Geraldton
- Jellicoe
- Longlac
- Macdiarmid
- Nakina
- Orient Bay

The municipal administrative offices are located in Geraldton. Nakina and Caramat are entirely exclaved from the rest of the municipality's territory.

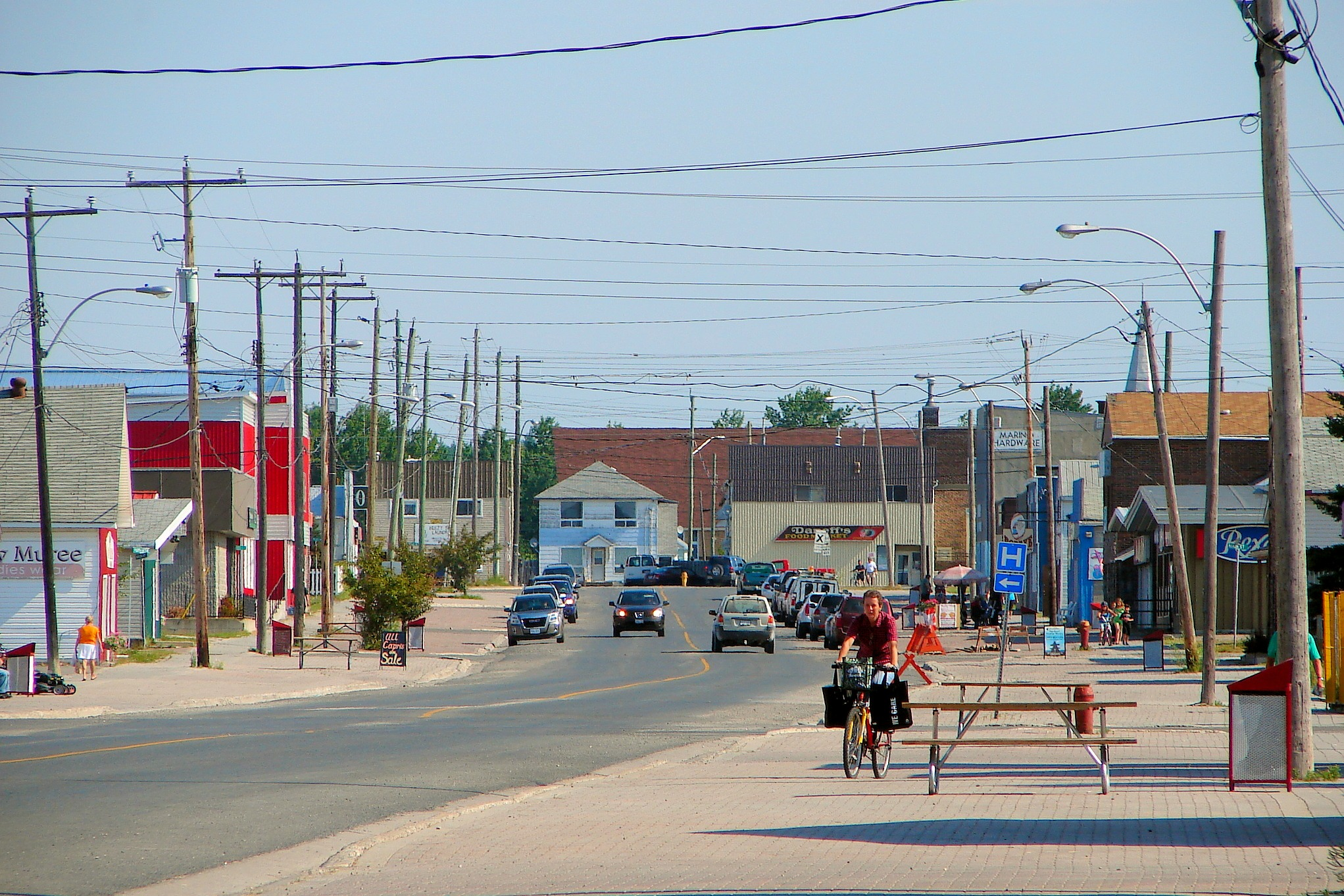
Geraldton

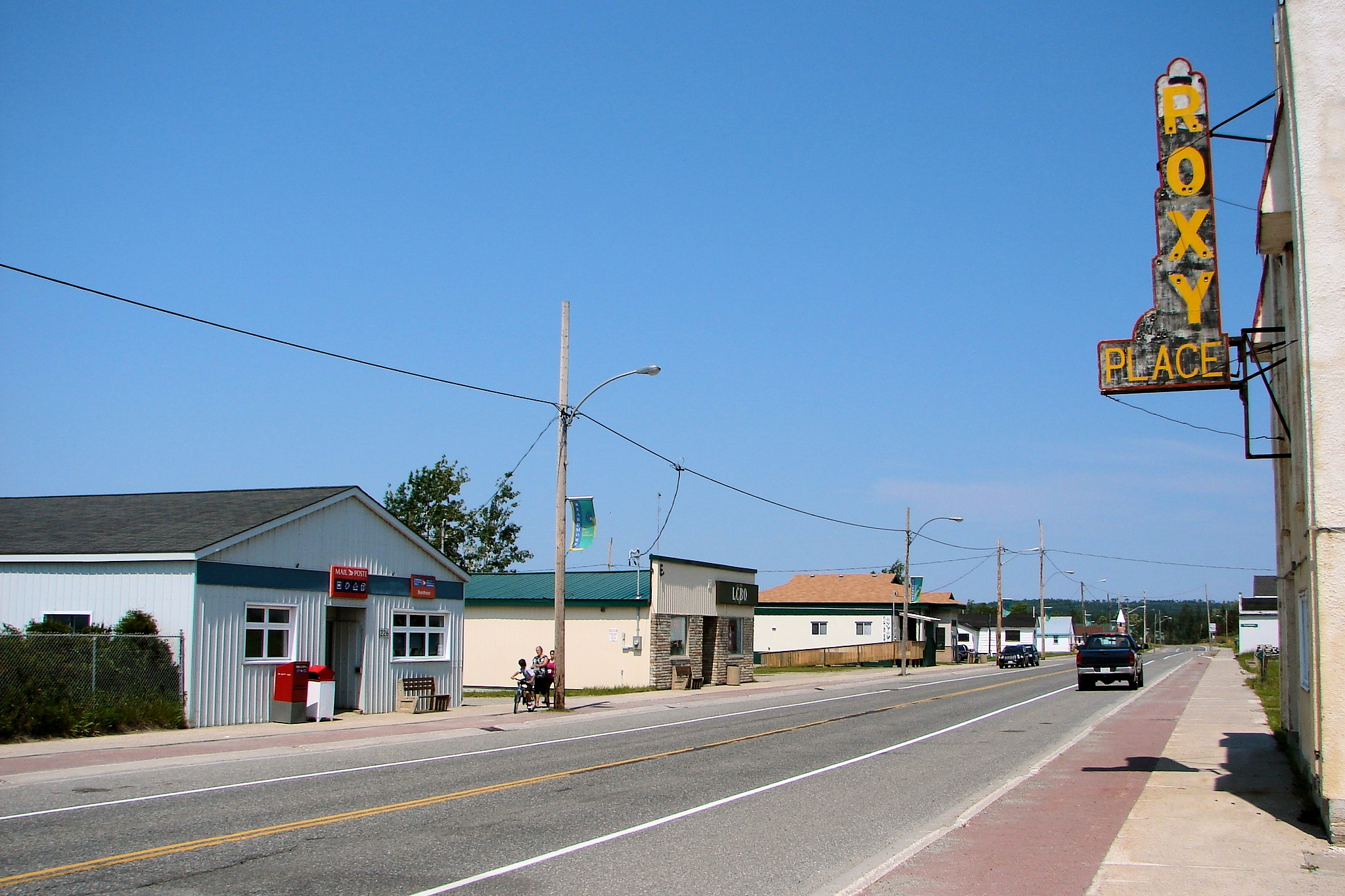
Beardmore

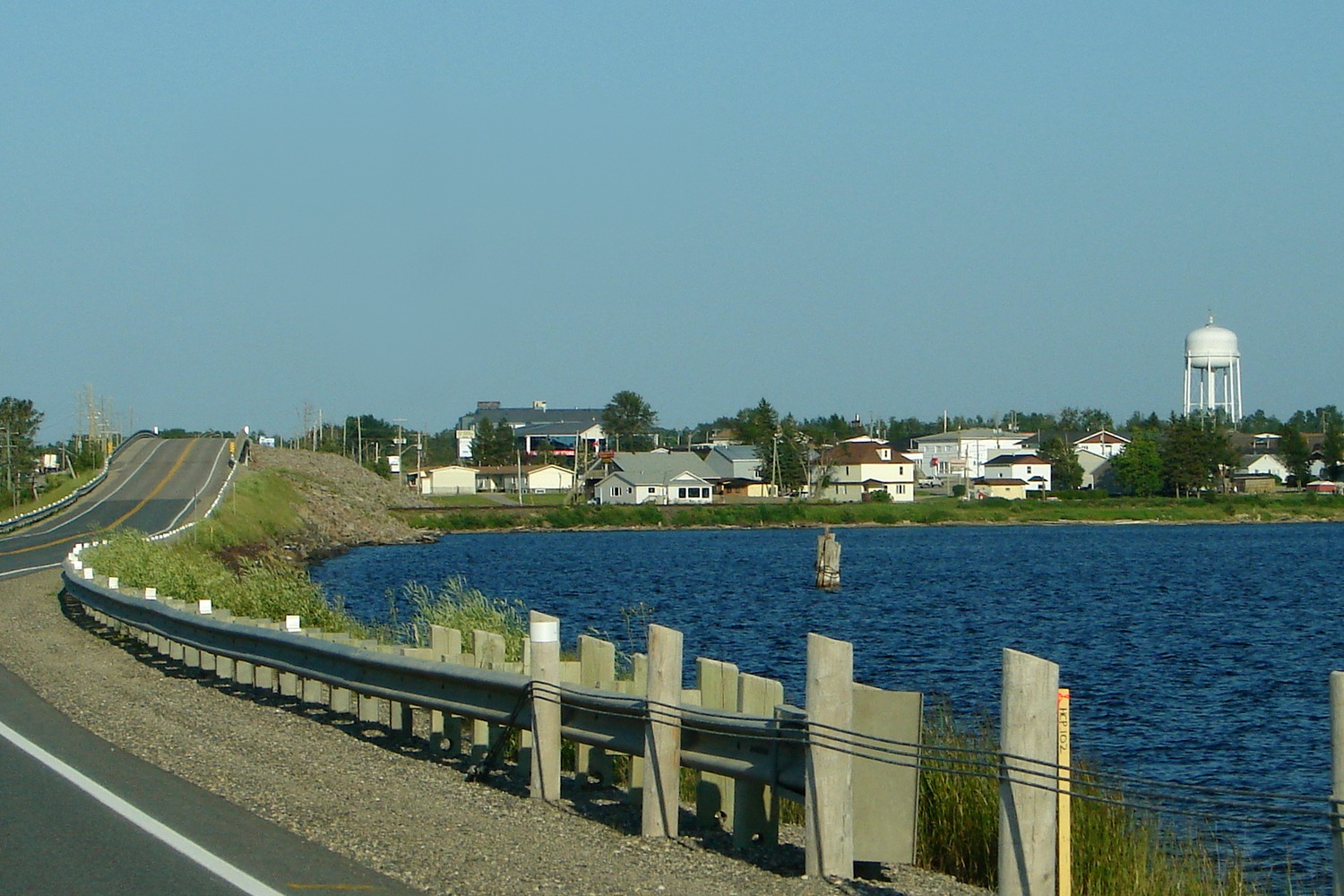
Longlac

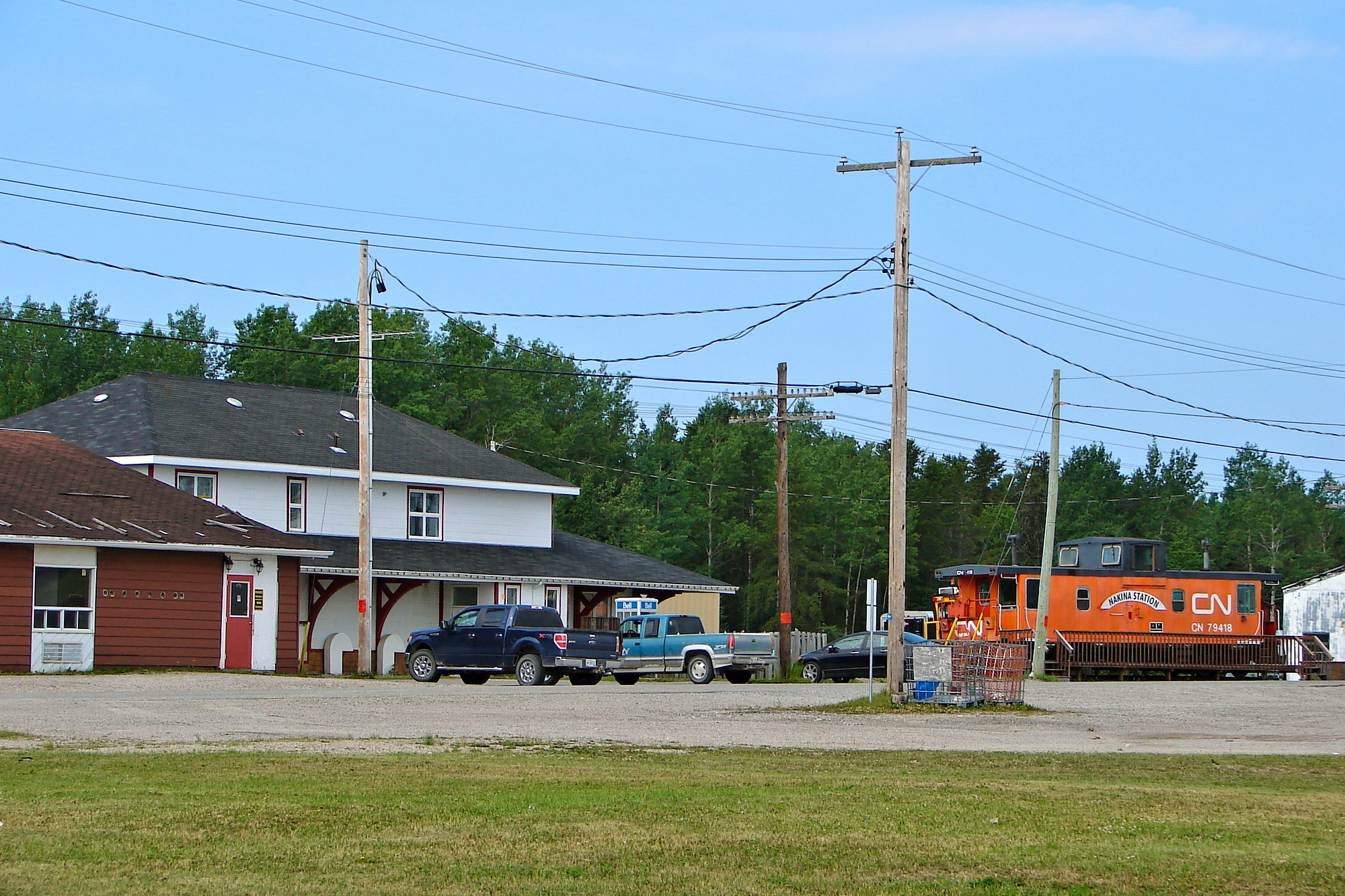
Nakina

=== Climate ===
Greenstone experiences a humid continental climate (Köppen climate classification Dfb), with cold winters and warm summers. The highest temperature ever recorded in the area was 40.0 °C (104.0 °F) on 11 and 12 July 1936 at Longlac. The coldest temperature ever recorded was −50.2 °C (−58.4 °F) on 31 January 1996 (at Geraldton Airport).

Climate data for Greenstone (Geraldton Airport), 1991−2020 normals, extremes 1921−present (Note: Extreme high and low temperatures in the table below were recorded at Longlac from March 1921 to July 1948, at Geraldton from August 1948 to July 1981 and at Geraldton Airport from August 1981 to present.)
| Month | Jan | Feb | Mar | Apr | May | Jun | Jul | Aug | Sep | Oct | Nov | Dec | Year |
|---|---|---|---|---|---|---|---|---|---|---|---|---|---|
| Record high °C (°F) | 7.8 (46.0) | 11.1 (52.0) | 20.7 (69.3) | 28.9 (84.0) | 33.1 (91.6) | 37.0 (98.6) | 40.0 (104.0) | 36.7 (98.1) | 32.8 (91.0) | 28.9 (84.0) | 20.1 (68.2) | 10.8 (51.4) | 40.0 (104.0) |
| Mean daily maximum °C (°F) | −12.2 (10.0) | −8.8 (16.2) | −1.3 (29.7) | 6.6 (43.9) | 15.2 (59.4) | 21.4 (70.5) | 23.6 (74.5) | 22.3 (72.1) | 16.5 (61.7) | 7.6 (45.7) | −1.0 (30.2) | −8.3 (17.1) | 6.8 (44.2) |
| Daily mean °C (°F) | −18.5 (−1.3) | −16.1 (3.0) | −8.7 (16.3) | 0.0 (32.0) | 8.4 (47.1) | 14.7 (58.5) | 17.4 (63.3) | 16.1 (61.0) | 10.9 (51.6) | 3.4 (38.1) | −5.1 (22.8) | −13.3 (8.1) | 0.8 (33.4) |
| Mean daily minimum °C (°F) | −24.7 (−12.5) | −23.4 (−10.1) | −16.1 (3.0) | −6.7 (19.9) | 1.6 (34.9) | 8.0 (46.4) | 11.1 (52.0) | 9.9 (49.8) | 5.2 (41.4) | −0.8 (30.6) | −9.3 (15.3) | −18.3 (−0.9) | −5.3 (22.5) |
| Record low °C (°F) | −50.2 (−58.4) | −49.3 (−56.7) | −45.0 (−49.0) | −36.1 (−33.0) | −15.0 (5.0) | −6.1 (21.0) | −3.9 (25.0) | −4.4 (24.1) | −8.3 (17.1) | −24.4 (−11.9) | −37.8 (−36.0) | −46.7 (−52.1) | −50.2 (−58.4) |
| Average precipitation mm (inches) | 35.9 (1.41) | 25.5 (1.00) | 32.5 (1.28) | 48.9 (1.93) | 78.2 (3.08) | 81.5 (3.21) | 108.0 (4.25) | 76.2 (3.00) | 102.0 (4.02) | 83.9 (3.30) | 52.7 (2.07) | 36.9 (1.45) | 762.2 (30.01) |
| Average rainfall mm (inches) | 0.6 (0.02) | 0.6 (0.02) | 7.4 (0.29) | 21.4 (0.84) | 73.0 (2.87) | 81.2 (3.20) | 108.0 (4.25) | 76.2 (3.00) | 100.3 (3.95) | 60.9 (2.40) | 14.9 (0.59) | 2.1 (0.08) | 546.5 (21.52) |
| Average snowfall cm (inches) | 43.4 (17.1) | 30.5 (12.0) | 28.8 (11.3) | 27.8 (10.9) | 4.9 (1.9) | 0.3 (0.1) | 0.0 (0.0) | 0.0 (0.0) | 1.5 (0.6) | 23.5 (9.3) | 44.1 (17.4) | 44.3 (17.4) | 249.0 (98.0) |
| Average precipitation days (≥ 0.2 mm) | 14.3 | 11.4 | 11.8 | 9.9 | 13.3 | 13.5 | 14.6 | 13.7 | 15.4 | 16.8 | 15.9 | 16.5 | 167.1 |
| Average rainy days (≥ 0.2 mm) | 0.44 | 0.46 | 2.1 | 4.8 | 12.4 | 13.4 | 14.6 | 13.7 | 15.0 | 11.9 | 4.0 | 1.1 | 94.0 |
| Average snowy days (≥ 0.2 cm) | 15.0 | 11.5 | 10.6 | 6.7 | 2.2 | 0.07 | 0.0 | 0.0 | 0.71 | 7.6 | 13.8 | 16.8 | 85.0 |
| Average relative humidity (%) (at 1 5:00 LST) | 68.9 | 60.4 | 52.9 | 48.1 | 50.6 | 52.1 | 55.7 | 56.9 | 63.4 | 69.7 | 75.2 | 75.6 | 60.8 |
Source: Environment Canada

== History ==
T. L. Taunton, of the Geological Survey of Canada, noted gold in quartz fragments around Little Long Lac in 1917. Similarly, Tony Oklend found ore in a boulder during World War I. However, it wouldn't be until 1931 that Bill "Hard Rock" Smith and Stan Watson would stake 18 claims along 3 veins. Tom Johnson and Robert Wells filed claims based on gold appearing in Magnet Lake quartz outcrop and the presence of bismuthinite. The Bankfield Gold Mine developed from these claims. In 1932, Johnson and Oklend staked 12 claims at Little Long Lac. Fred MacLeod and Arthur Cockshutt filed 15 claims near Smith's.

Nakina was established in 1923 as a station and railway yard on the National Transcontinental Railway, between the divisional points of Grant and Armstrong. Nakina was at Mile 15.9 of the NTR's Grant Sub-Division. Following the completion in 1924 of the Longlac-Nakina Cut-Off by the Canadian National Railway, connecting the rails of the Canadian Northern Railway at Longlac and the NTR, Nakina became the new divisional point, and the buildings from the town of Grant (25 km (16 mi) to the east) were moved to the new Nakina town site.

In the 1930s the Beardmore Relics, Viking Age artifacts were found near Beardmore, which were proposed to be evidence of Vikings in Ontario. Later, the relics were proven to have been a hoax. Through a series of witnesses as well as the son of the person who had found them, the relics were found to have been planted in Beardmore and not, as was suggested, found there.

By 1934, a gold rush absorbed the area from Long Lac to Nipigon, a belt 100 km (62 mi) long and 40 km (25 mi) wide. The village of Hard Rock was established in 1934, and Longlac, Bankfield, and Geraldton soon followed. Though a 1936 fire threatened the mines, development was able to continue.

As an important railway service stop from 1923 until 1986, the town had a railway round-house as well as a watering and fuelling capability. During World War II, there was also a radar base on the edge of the town, intended to watch for a potential attack on the strategically important Soo Locks at Sault Ste. Marie. Research into the radar site in the Library and Archives Canada indicates that it was largely a United States Army Air Forces operation, pre-dating the Pinetree Line radar bases that were erected to focus on the Cold War threat. The Nakina base was totally removed shortly after the war.

The settlement of Geraldton is a compound of the surname of financiers of a nearby gold mine near Kenogamisis Lake in 1931 (Fitzgerald and Errington).

The Geraldton-Beardmore Gold Camp, in the heart of the Canadian Shield, hosts numerous mineralized zones which continue to be explored for potential development. Eight gold mines operated here between 1936 and 1970.

Tom Powers and Phil Silams staked what became the Northern Empire Mine (1925–1988) near Beardmore, which produced a total of 149,493 ounces of gold. The Little Long Lac Mine (1934–1953) produced 605,449 ounces of gold, besides producing scheelite. J.M. Wood and W.T. Brown developed the Sturgeon River Gold Mine (1936–1942), which produced 73,438 ounces of gold. James and Russell Cryderman found and Karl Springer incorporated what became known as the Leitch Gold Mine (1936–1968), which produced 861,982 ounces of gold from 0.92 grade ore. The Bankfield Gold Mines produced 66,416 ounces by 1942. Tomball Mines (1938–1942), started by Tom and Bill Johnson, produced 69,416 ounces. The Magnet Mine (1938–1942) produced 152,089 ounces. The Hard Rock Mine (1938–1951) produced 269,081 ounces, while the MacLeod-Cockshutt (1938–1970) produced 1,516,980 ounces.

In the 1970s pulp and paper operations near the town resulted in growth in the town's population to its peak of approximately 1,200. However, at this point, cost controls in the railway industry meant that service and maintenance could be consolidated at points much more distant from one another than had been common in the first half of the 20th century. As a result, the value of Nakina as a railway service community was greatly diminished, to the point where the railway was no longer a substantial employer in the town. Also in the 1970s, a radio station was launched in Longlac as CHAP on the AM dial; this station left the air by the late 1970s.

The town remains focused on tourism, diminished pulp and paper operations and support of other more northern communities (food, fuel and transportation). Mining and minerals industries are seen as a potential source of further growth.

As of 2009, a proposed ore transport point around Nakina, as part of the Ring of Fire development, may shift the emphasis of local industry from logging back to mining. In 2010 the Ring of Fire development, proposed James Bay rail link and placement of processing plants remains of great economic interest for the region. Development was expected to cost more than $1.5 billion. In 2019, negotiations with communities were continuing.

On 19 February 2011, Beardmore was temporarily evacuated after a major explosion ruptured the TransCanada pipeline in the community.

In May 2016, the municipality was placed under a state of emergency due to the approach of forest fires. Flames reached within 500m of the municipal buildings in Geraldton and crossed the runway of the town's airport, but no structures were lost.

On 29 August 2024, the Greenstone gold mine was officially opened, bringing gold mining back to Greenstone for the first time since the 1970s.

== Demographics ==
In the 2021 Census of Population conducted by Statistics Canada, Greenstone had a population of 4,309 living in 1,920 of its 2,449 total private dwellings, a change of −7.1% from its 2016 population of 4,636. With a land area of 2,727.04 km^{2} (1,052.92 sq mi), it had a population density of 1.6/km^{2} (4.1/sq mi) in 2021.

Canada census – Greenstone community profile

| | 2021 | 2016 | 2011 |
| Population | 4,309 (-7.1% from 2016) | 4,636 (-1.9% from 2011) | 4,724 (-3.3% from 2006) |
| Land area | 2,727.04 km^{2} (1,052.92 sq mi) | 2,767.19 km^{2} (1,068.42 sq mi) | 2,767.76 km^{2} (1,068.64 sq mi) |
| Population density | 1.6/km^{2} (4.1/sq mi) | 1.7/km^{2} (4.4/sq mi) | 1.7/km^{2} (4.4/sq mi) |
| Median age | 47.2 (M: 46.4, F: 47.6) | 45.4 (M: 45.4, F: 45.4) |
| Private dwellings | 2,449 (total) 1,920 (occupied) | 2,592 (total) | 2,629 (total) |
| Median household income | $72,000 |

Notes: Includes population and dwelling count amendments.
References: 2021 2016 2011

Historical census populations – Greenstone, Ontario
| Year | Pop. | ±% |
|---|---|---|
| 1996 | 6,530 | — |
| 2001 | 5,901 | −9.6% |
| 2006 | 4,906 | −16.9% |
| 2011 | 4,724 | −3.7% |
| 2016 | 4,636 | −1.9% |
| 2021 | 4,309 | −7.1% |
Source: Statistics Canada

== Government ==
Greenstone's mayor is James McPherson.

The Greenstone Public Library has branches in Beardmore, Geraldton (the Elsie Dugard Centennial Branch), Longlac and Nakina (the Helen Mackie Memorial Branch).

== Insignia ==
On 4 March 2006 Letters Patent were presented by the Canadian Heraldic Authority, granting arms, flag and badge to the Corporation of the Municipality of Greenstone. The flag consists in a banner of arms while the badge is described as: on a miner's pick and a double-bitted axe in saltire Argent hafted Vert, a railway wheel Or charged with a grey wolf's head erased proper.

== Transportation ==
Greenstone lies along Highway 11, the northern branch of the Trans-Canada Highway through Northern Ontario. It has airports in Geraldton and Nakina.

The municipality is served by Via Rail services at Longlac, Nakina, and Caramat stations.

== In film ==
The First Nations television series Spirit Bay was shot here by the CBC in the mid-1980s at the Biinjitiwaabik Zaaging Anishinaabek First Nation Reserve near MacDiarmid. The film Coconut Hero was also filmed partially in Geraldton.

== Notable people ==
- Boris Elik, National Hockey League (NHL) hockey player
- John Grisdale, NHL hockey player
- James Hendry, soldier and recipient of the George Cross
- Roy Thomas, painter
- Jane Urquhart, novelist
- Kelsey Wilson, NHL hockey player
- Tyler Tucker, NHL hockey player
- Norval Morrisseau, artist

== See also ==
- List of townships in Ontario
- List of francophone communities in Ontario
- Matachewan
- Cobalt silver rush
- Porcupine Gold Rush
- Red Lake, Ontario
