= Red Rock, Ontario =

Red Rock
- Township (single-tier)
- Township of Red Rock
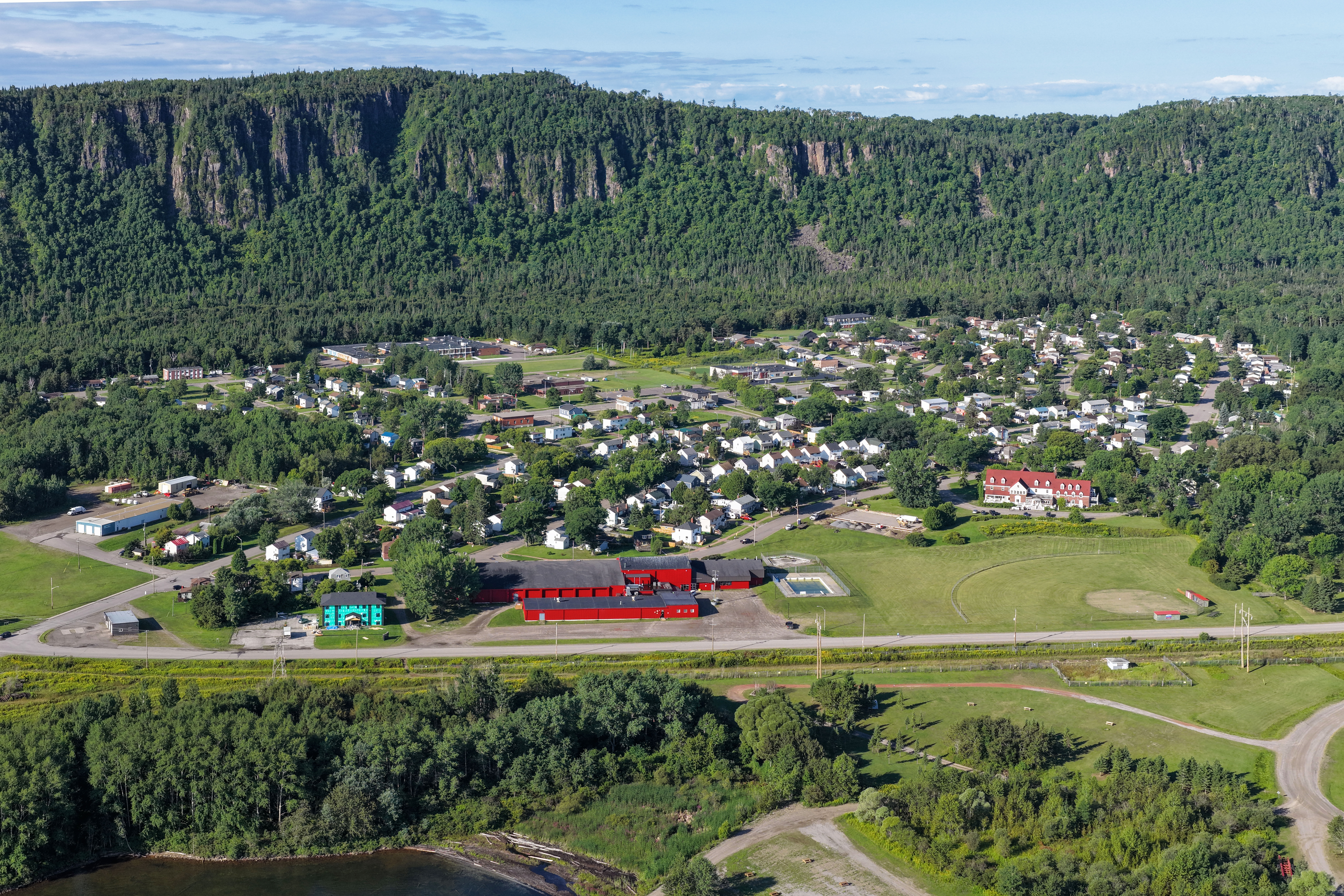

- Location within Ontario
- Coordinates: 48°57′N 088°17′W
- Country: Canada
- Province: Ontario
- District: Thunder Bay
- Settled: 1920s
- Incorporated: November 1980

Government
  - Mayor: Darquise Robinson
  - Federal riding: Thunder Bay—Superior North
  - Prov. riding: Thunder Bay—Superior North

Area
  - Land: 62.10 km^{2} (23.98 sq mi)

Population (2021)
  - Total: 895
  - Density: 14.4/km^{2} (37/sq mi)
- Time zone: UTC-5 (EST)
  - Summer (DST): UTC-4 (EDT)
- Postal Code: P0T 2P0
- Area code: 807 (886 exchange)
- Website: www.redrocktownship.com

Red Rock is a township in Northwestern Ontario, Canada, located in the Thunder Bay District. The community of Red Rock sits on the shore of Lake Superior, just south of where the Nipigon River drains into Nipigon Bay on the north shore of Lake Superior. The population as of 2021 is 895.

The Red Rock Folk Festival, held by the Live From the Rock Folk & Blues Society, is held each year.

== History ==
In the 1800s the Hudson's Bay Company post on the northwest shore of Lake Nipigon maintained an outpost at the mouth of the Nipigon River near Red Rock. In early years it was a minor establishment, and in 1865 Stevenson described, "The station consisting primarily of two large log buildings, viz a one-roomed dwelling house and a store - also a potato patch, has an unimportant neglected look. There are besides two small log shanties ... Outside the enclosure there are a few wigwams ...". There was an active fishery at Red Rock post with catch supplemented by Nipigon House; in post diaries fishing stations on Lake Nipigon itself are identified at English Bay, Sandy River, Peche au Large, Grande Peche, Roche qui Frappe, and Isle aux Brochel). Red Rock House was significantly expanded in the early 1870s.

The Canadian Pacific Railway was built through the area in the 1880s. The first permanent settlers were Finnish homesteaders. Around 1920, its first school was built. That same decade, the Nipigon Highway was built, providing road access to the farming community.

In 1937, construction began on a paper mill, along with a new town site for employee homes and bunkhouses. Also built that same year were the Quebec Lodge for company officials and the Red Rock Inn. But the mill company went bankrupt in 1938, and the project was abandoned.

In 1940, the mill site was bought by the Canadian Government, who converted the bunkhouses into a prisoner-of-war camp, known as Camp "R". It housed German soldiers, merchant seamen, and even German Jews, the first of which arrived in July 1940. Guards and officers lived at the Red Rock Inn or in the few houses that had already been built. In October 1941, all prisoners were transferred to other internment camps and the site was closed.

In 1942, a new pulp and paper company bought the site and construction of a mill began again in 1944. On July 20, 1945, the community was incorporated as the Improvement District of Red Rock. That same year, the mill became operational. The town grew with new stores, a theatre, a public school, two railroad stations, and a church. In the 1950s, the mill changed ownership and expanded, further increasing the town's population. In 1961, the mill became part of the newsprint and container board division of Domtar.

In 1980, the place was incorporated as a township with elected reeve and council. Its first reeve was Douglas McAllen.

In the 1990s, operations and workforce at the mill were reduced, and in 2006, it shut down permanently.

== Demographics ==
In the 2021 Census of Population conducted by Statistics Canada, Red Rock had a population of 895 living in 407 of its 455 total private dwellings, a change of 0% from its 2016 population of 895. With a land area of 62.1 km^{2} (24.0 sq mi), it had a population density of 14.4/km^{2} (37.3/sq mi) in 2021.

Canada census – Red Rock community profile

	2021	2016	2011
Population	895 (0.0% from 2016)	895 (-5.0% from 2011)	942 (-11.4% from 2006)
Land area	62.10 km^{2} (23.98 sq mi)	62.21 km^{2} (24.02 sq mi)	62.93 km^{2} (24.30 sq mi)
Population density	14.4/km^{2} (37/sq mi)	14.4/km^{2} (37/sq mi)	15.0/km^{2} (39/sq mi)
Median age	47.6 (M: 47.2, F: 47.6)	48.6 (M: 49.4, F: 47.0)
Private dwellings	455 (total) 407 (occupied)	444 (total) 381 (occupied)	472 (total)
Median household income	$71,000	$69,376

References: 2021 2016 2011

Red Rock, Township - Historical populations

Year	Pop.	±%
1951	1,145	—
1956	1,652	+44.3%
1961	1,861	+12.7%
1966	1,980	+6.4%
1971	1,892	−4.4%
1976	1,694	−10.5%
1981	1,448	−14.5%
1986	1,509	+4.2%

Year	Pop.	±%
1991	1,421	−5.8%
1996	1,258	−11.5%
2001	1,233	−2.0%
2006	1,063	−13.8%
2011	942	−11.4%
2016	895	−5.0%
2021	895	+0.0%

Population figures prior to 1980 based on Red Rock Improvement District. Population counts are not adjusted for boundary changes.
Source: Statistics Canada

== Economy ==
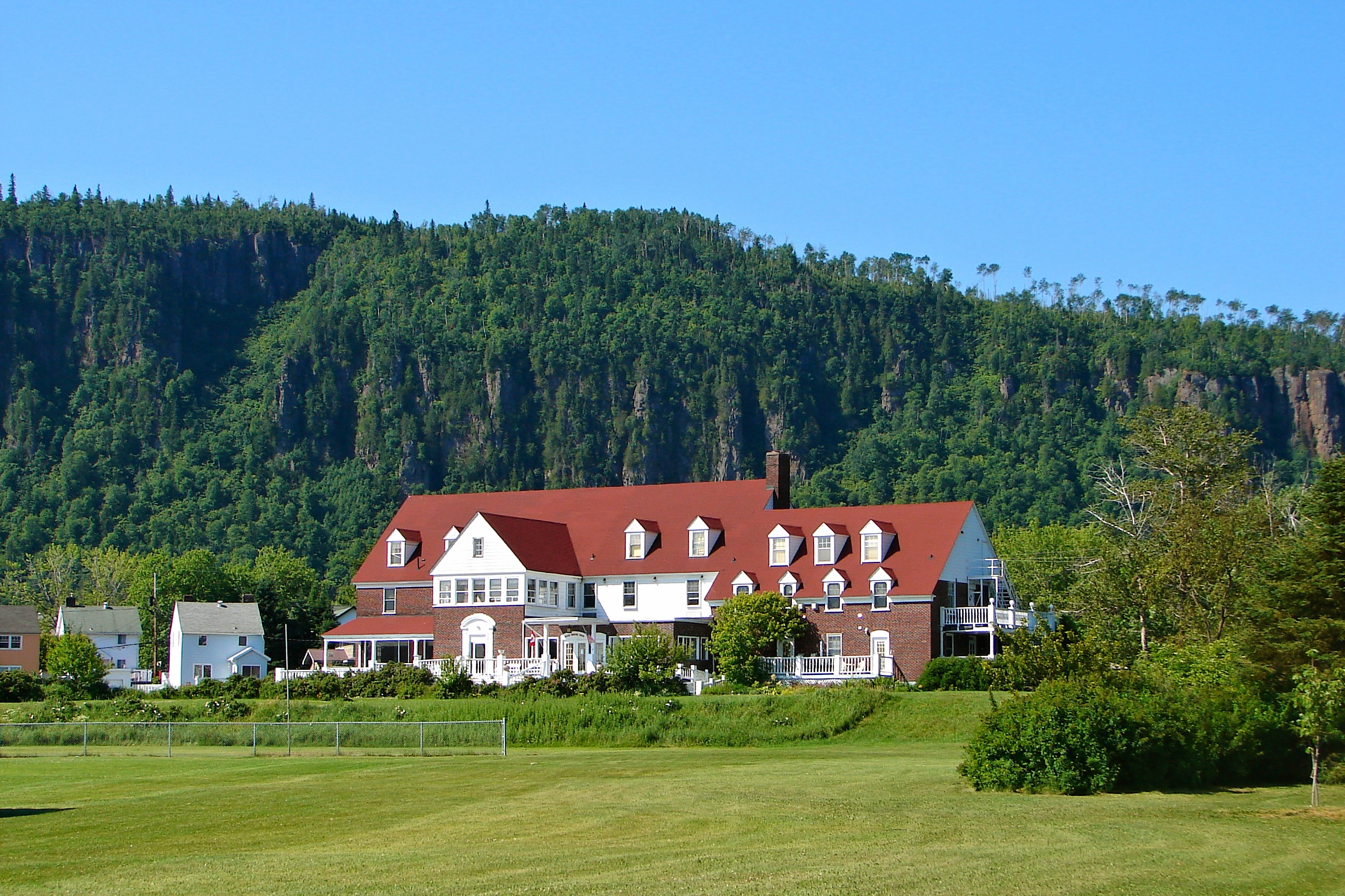
Red Rock Inn, a post-and-beam landmark in Neo-Georgian style and once the social centre of the community. Over the years, it has also been home to several businesses, a library, classrooms, and housing for teachers.

Red Rock's main source of employment was a kraft paper mill owned by Norampac. The mill originally consisted of two kraft paper machines but in late 2005 was reduced to running one machine. On August 31, 2006, Norampac announced the indefinite closure of the container board plant. This was due to unfavourable economic conditions such as the rising price of fibre, energy costs and the strengthening Canadian dollar.

In September 2007 Norampac announced the sale of its Red Rock plant to American Logistic Services Inc. A new plywood mill was supposed to be operational by fall 2008, this deadline had been pushed back to spring 2009. The plans were ultimately cancelled however as the plant was torn down and the land was sold to Riversedge Developments in April 2015. There has been talk of constructing a sea port and biomass plant on the land, but it remains unclear whether this will be the case. In 2023, Rock Tech Lithium, BMI Group and Red Rock Indian Band signed a memorandum of understanding with the hopes of building a build a lithium conversion facility and shipping port on the former Norampac site. The site may also include residential and commercial uses.

== Notable residents ==
- Heather Houston, 1989 Women's World Curling Champion

== See also ==
- List of townships in Ontario
