= Marathon, Ontario =

Marathon
- Town (single-tier)
- Town of Marathon
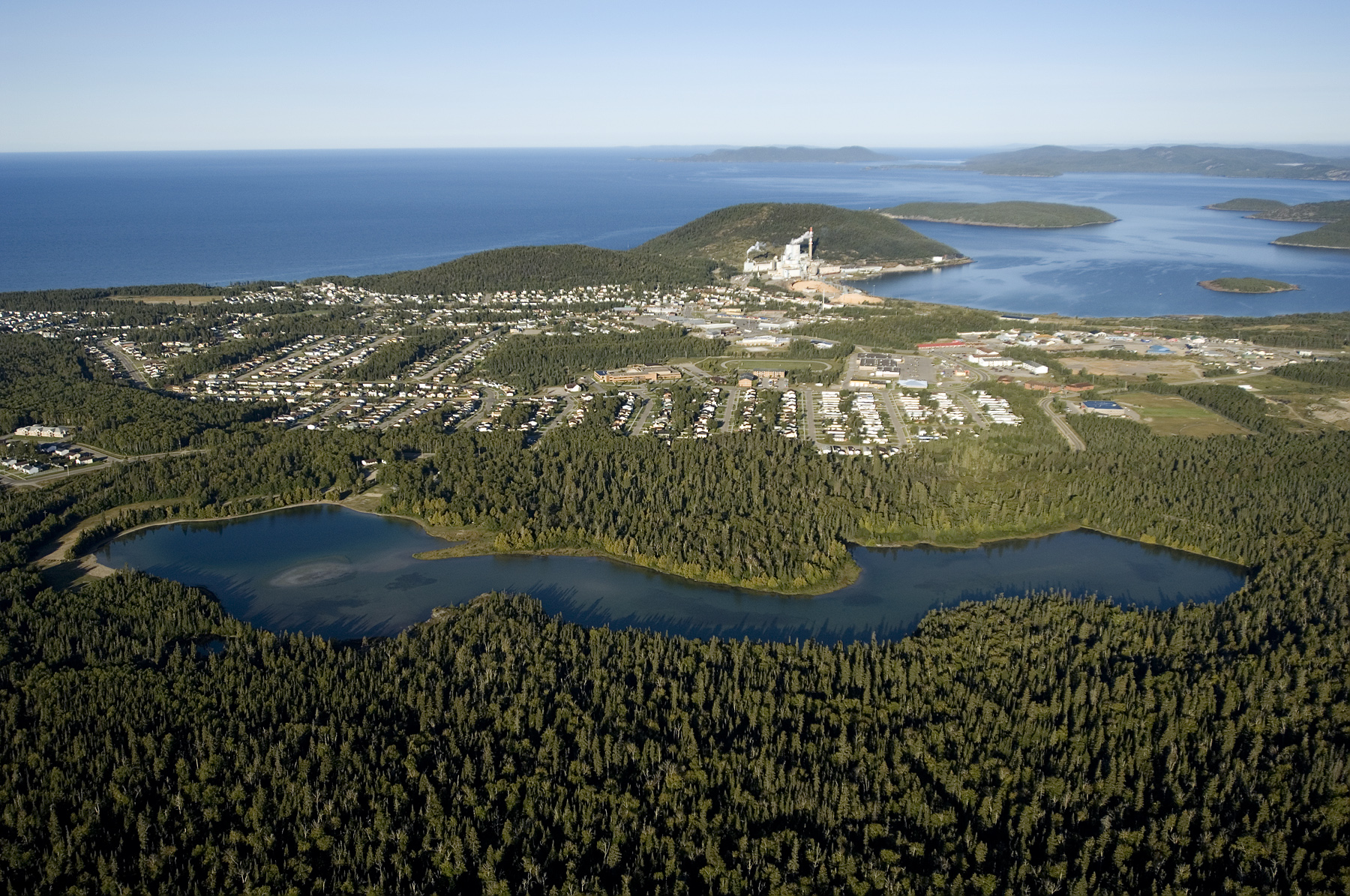
- Motto: Built On Paper - Laced With Gold!
- Location within Ontario
- Coordinates: 48°45′N 86°22′W
- Country: Canada
- Province: Ontario
- District: Thunder Bay
- Established: 1944
- Improvement District: December 31, 1946
- Township: 1970

Government
  - Mayor: Rick Dumas
  - CAO: Darryl Skworchinski
  - Councillors: List of councillors: Terry Fox; Ray Lake; Chantal Gingras; Kelly Tsubouchi
  - Fed. riding: Thunder Bay—Superior North
  - Prov. riding: Thunder Bay—Superior North

Area
  - Land: 167.03 km^{2} (64.49 sq mi)
  - Urban: 4.33 km^{2} (1.67 sq mi)
- Elevation: 220 m (720 ft)

Population (2021)
  - Town (single-tier): 3,138
  - Density: 18.8/km^{2} (49/sq mi)
  - Urban: 3,022
  - Urban density: 698.4/km^{2} (1,809/sq mi)
- Time zone: UTC-5 (EST)
  - Summer (DST): UTC-4 (EDT)
- Postal Code: P0T 2E0
- Area code: 807
- Website: www.marathon.ca

Marathon is a town in the Canadian province of Ontario, located in Thunder Bay District, on the north shore of Lake Superior north of Pukaskwa National Park.

== Geography ==
Personal residences encompass an area starting from Lake Superior, and stretch out to a new subdivision near Penn Lake, an in-town campsite and beach in the eastern portion of the town. The Pic River is outside of the town's eastern limits.

The town is adjacent to Peninsula Harbour and has several coves including Carden Cove, Sturdee Cove and Craddock Cove; all three are west-northwest of Marathon. Penn Lake is a local lake within the town where tourists can enjoy camping and water sports.

Heron Bay is a town located to the south of Marathon and shares the post office and phone prefix. The Pic River First Nation is on the outskirts of Pukaskwa National Park.

=== Climate ===
Marathon has a warm-summer humid continental climate (Köppen: Dfb), with its position north of Lake Superior the climate is attenuated, mainly the southern heatwaves, due to the hot air masses already have crossing the entire lake. It is noted differences with Thunder Bay, for example, keeping winters still rigorous but warm summers and sometimes cool.

A weather station was run in the town from 1950 to 1983. Data is sparse. The data presented below is from a short-lived station at nearby Terrace Bay.

Climate data for Terrace Bay, Ontario
Month	Jan	Feb	Mar	Apr	May	Jun	Jul	Aug	Sep	Oct	Nov	Dec	Year
Record high °C (°F)	3 (37)	7 (45)	13 (55)	20 (68)	25 (77)	30 (86)	30 (86)	33 (91)	27 (81)	18 (64)	15 (59)	9 (48)	33 (91)
Mean daily maximum °C (°F)	−9 (16)	−3 (27)	1 (34)	8 (46)	14 (57)	19 (66)	22 (72)	21 (70)	17 (63)	10 (50)	2 (36)	−6 (21)	8 (47)
Daily mean °C (°F)	−15.1 (4.8)	−8.5 (16.7)	−5.6 (21.9)	1.3 (34.3)	7.7 (45.9)	12.5 (54.5)	15.9 (60.6)	15.1 (59.2)	11.4 (52.5)	4.9 (40.8)	−1.7 (28.9)	−10.5 (13.1)	2.3 (36.1)
Mean daily minimum °C (°F)	−21 (−6)	−14 (7)	−12 (10)	−5 (23)	2 (36)	6 (43)	10 (50)	9 (48)	6 (43)	0 (32)	−5 (23)	−15 (5)	−3 (26)
Record low °C (°F)	−38 (−36)	−34 (−29)	−30 (−22)	−22 (−8)	−8 (18)	−3 (27)	0 (32)	0 (32)	−6 (21)	−11 (12)	−23 (−9)	−36 (−33)	−38 (−36)
Average precipitation mm (inches)	69 (2.7)	49 (1.9)	71 (2.8)	35 (1.4)	85 (3.3)	109 (4.3)	60 (2.4)	83 (3.3)	96 (3.8)	115 (4.5)	67 (2.6)	53 (2.1)	892 (35.1)
Average rainfall mm (inches)	1 (0.0)	14 (0.6)	27 (1.1)	14 (0.6)	85 (3.3)	109 (4.3)	60 (2.4)	83 (3.3)	96 (3.8)	111 (4.4)	34 (1.3)	2 (0.1)	636 (25.0)
Average snowfall cm (inches)	92 (36)	36 (14)	45 (18)	21 (8.3)	0 (0)	0 (0)	0 (0)	0 (0)	0 (0)	3 (1.2)	34 (13)	68 (27)	299 (118)
Source: The Weather Network

Climate data for Marathon, elevation: 189 m or 620 ft, extremes ~1950-1983
Month	Jan	Feb	Mar	Apr	May	Jun	Jul	Aug	Sep	Oct	Nov	Dec	Year
Record high °C (°F)	7.2 (45.0)	8.3 (46.9)	12.8 (55.0)	24.5 (76.1)	28.9 (84.0)	30.0 (86.0)	32.2 (90.0)	30 (86)	25.6 (78.1)	25.0 (77.0)	17.2 (63.0)	13.5 (56.3)	32.2 (90.0)
Record low °C (°F)	−45.0 (−49.0)	−36.1 (−33.0)	−33.3 (−27.9)	−21.1 (−6.0)	−10.0 (14.0)	−2.5 (27.5)	1.5 (34.7)	1.1 (34.0)	−6.1 (21.0)	−9.4 (15.1)	−27.8 (−18.0)	−34.4 (−29.9)	−45.0 (−49.0)
Source: Environment Canada

== Demographics ==
In the 2021 Census of Population conducted by Statistics Canada, Marathon had a population of 3,138 living in 1,412 of its 1,602 total private dwellings, a change of −4.1% from its 2016 population of 3,273. With a land area of 167.03 km^{2} (64.49 sq mi), it had a population density of 18.8/km^{2} (48.7/sq mi) in 2021.

Canada census – Marathon community profile

	2021	2016	2011
Population	3,138 (-4.1% from 2016)	3,273 (-2.4% from 2011)	3,353 (-13.2% from 2006)
Land area	167.03 km^{2} (64.49 sq mi)	170.54 km^{2} (65.85 sq mi)	170.48 km^{2} (65.82 sq mi)
Population density	18.8/km^{2} (49/sq mi)	19.2/km^{2} (50/sq mi)	19.7/km^{2} (51/sq mi)
Median age	43.2 (M: 42.8, F: 43.6)	44.9 (M: 45.8, F: 44.4)
Private dwellings	1,602 (total) 1,412 (occupied)	1,643 (total)	1,653 (total)
Median household income	$92,000	$82.816

References: 2021 2016 2011

Historical census populations – Marathon, Ontario

Year	Pop.	±%
1951	1,766	—
1956	2,415	+36.7%
1961	2,568	+6.3%
1966	2,628	+2.3%
1971	2,456	−6.5%
1976	2,283	−7.0%
1981	2,277	−0.3%
1986	3,437	+50.9%

Year	Pop.	±%
1991	5,064	+47.3%
1996	4,791	−5.4%
2001	4,416	−7.8%
2006	3,863	−12.5%
2011	3,353	−13.2%
2016	3,273	−2.4%
2021	3,138	−4.1%

Source: Statistics Canada

== Economy ==
Marathon's resource economy was built on pulp, most recently managed by Marathon Pulp Inc. On February 12, 2009, Marathon Pulp Inc. announced an indefinite shutdown that eliminated hundreds of jobs from the region, and negatively impacted Marathon's tax base and its local economy. As of 2021 the mill has been demolished.

Starting in the mid-1980s Marathon's economy expanded to include gold mining. The Hemlo Operations included three gold mining operations: Williams, David Bell and Golden Giant mines. In 2009, Vancouver-based Teck Cominco mining company sold its 50% share of Williams and David Bell to its investing partner, Barrick Gold Corporation, while Golden Giant was decommissioned in 2005.

Marathon is the centre of commerce for the rural region in which it is situated. It boasts the largest indoor shopping mall between Thunder Bay and Sault Ste. Marie, and one of only three Canadian Tire department stores in the region.

== Recreation ==
Marathon has a children's park named after Del Earle, one of the town's founders, along with another park on Penn Lake.

Marathon has a challenging 9 hole golf course, cross-country skiing trails and downhill skiing (now closed), a 4-sheet curling venue (now closed), and the only indoor swimming pool between Thunder Bay and Sault Ste. Marie (now closed), and a movie theater along with an ice skating rink.

Pebble Beach is a 2 kilometres (1.2 mi) stretch along the shore of Lake Superior covered with rounded cobble-size stones.

Recent developments in the town include a new skatepark, basketball courts and the refinishing of the tennis courts.

== Culture and the arts ==
Marathon's art and culture community has varied over time.

Marathon has been home to a community entertainment series, a community choir, coffee houses & culture jams, a writer's group, an art gallery, house concerts, frequent dinner theatres, art and photography displays, quilting groups and shows, a ceramics club, annual craft shows, and numerous art classes.

A summer music series, known as "Concerts in the Parking Lot", was inaugurated in July 2006 and is held in the town centre on Wednesday evenings in summer. This casual series encompasses a variety of musical genres and showcases talent both local and from "away".

In 2010, Marathon was one of the many Canadian communities that the Vancouver 2010 Winter Olympics Torch Relay passed through.

Marathon is served by numerous organizations and services. These include, among many others, the Cub Scouts, Salvation Army, Girl Guides, Victim Services, and the Royal Canadian Air Cadets.

== Transportation ==
Marathon is located 2 km (1.2 mi) west of Trans Canada Highway 17, to which it is connected via Peninsula Road (formerly Highway 626). The town is served by the Canadian Pacific Railway and a geographically important airport (Marathon Aerodrome) just north of the Trans-Canada Highway, approximately 4 km (2.5 mi) northeast of the town. It has Ontario Northland motor coach service on its Sault Ste. Marie–Thunder Bay route.

== Education ==
Marathon is served by five schools. Three of these are public schools: Margaret Twomey Public School, Marathon High School, and École Secondaire Cité-Supérieure. Two are Roman Catholic separate schools: Holy Saviour School and École Val-des-Bois.

== See also ==
- List of francophone communities in Ontario
