= Daisy (given name) =

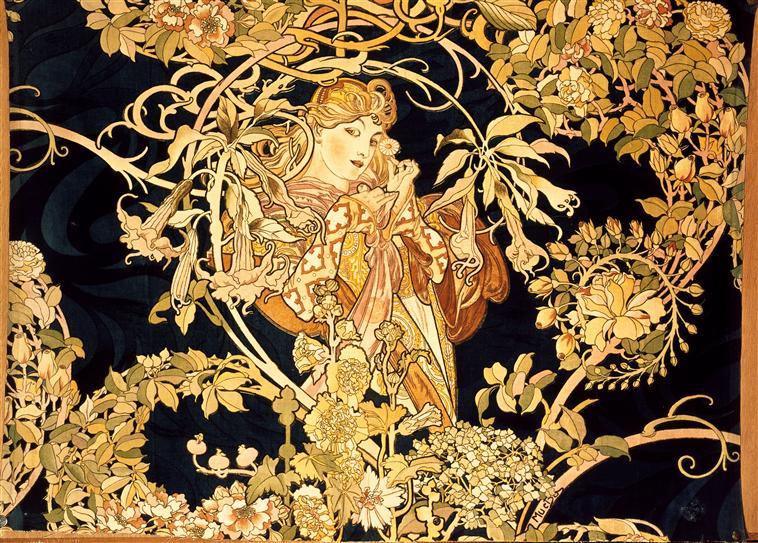
- Femme à la marguerite, an Art Nouveau illustration by Alfons Mucha.
- Pronunciation: /ˈdeɪzi/ DAY-zee
- Gender: Female

Origin
- Origin: Old English
- Meaning: "day's eye", daisy

Daisy is a feminine given name. The flower name comes from the Old English word dægeseage, meaning "day's eye". The name Daisy is therefore ultimately derived from this source. Daisy is also a nickname for Margaret because Marguerite, the French version of the latter name, is also a French name for the oxeye daisy.

== Popularity ==
The name came into popular use in the late Victorian era along with other flower names. Linda Rosenkrantz and Pamela Redmond Satran wrote in their 2007 book Baby Name Bible that Daisy has a "fresh, wholesome, and energetic" image. The name has been used for literary characters such as Daisy Miller, the title character of the novella by Henry James. In Louisa May Alcott's Little Women, a character named Margaret is "Meg" to her family, but "Daisy" to her wealthy would-be-friends. In television, Daisy Duke on The Dukes of Hazzard wears very short, form-fitting, denim cut-off jeans shorts, now often called Daisy Dukes after this character.

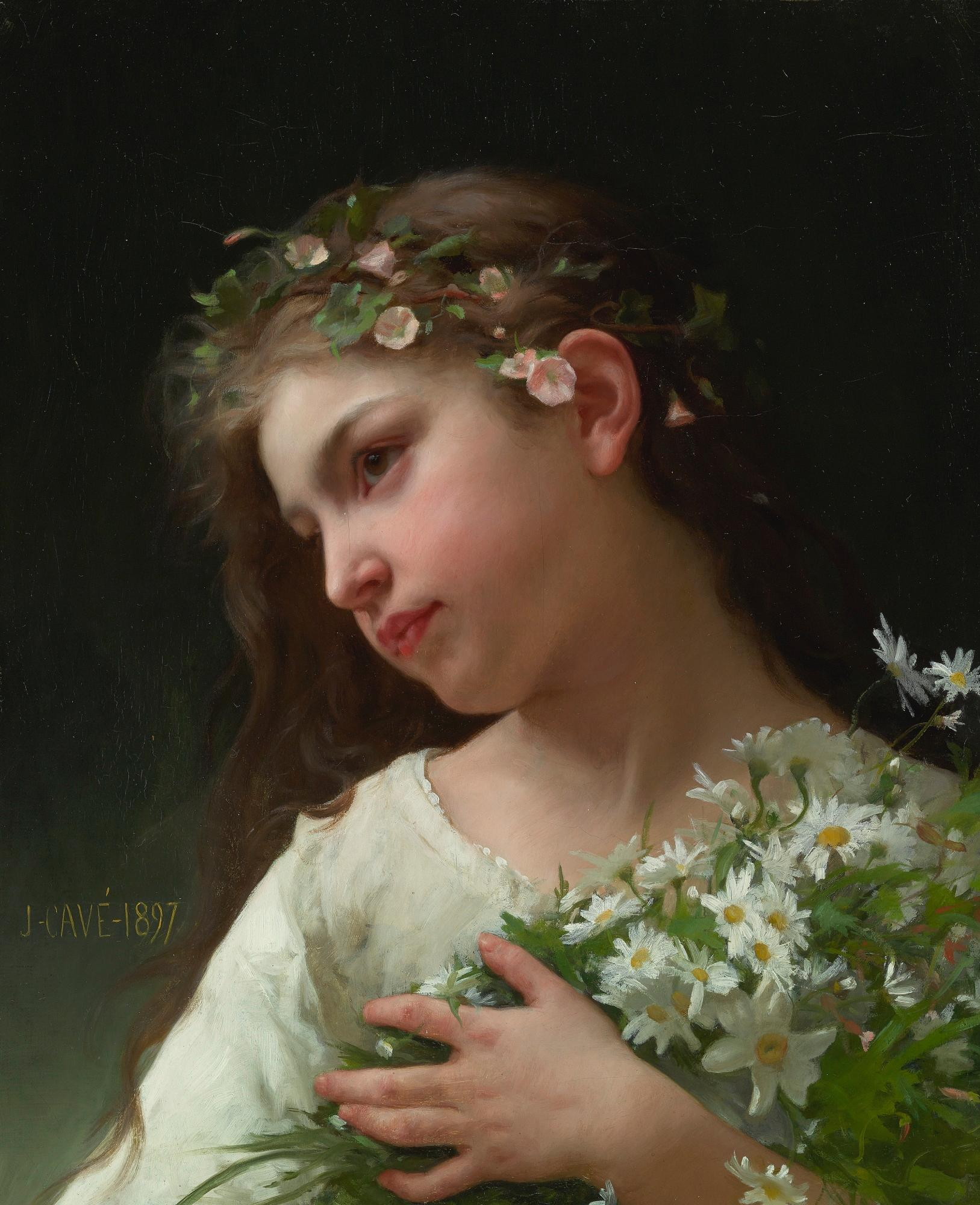
Girl with a Bouquet of Daisies by Jules-Cyrille Cavé, 1897.

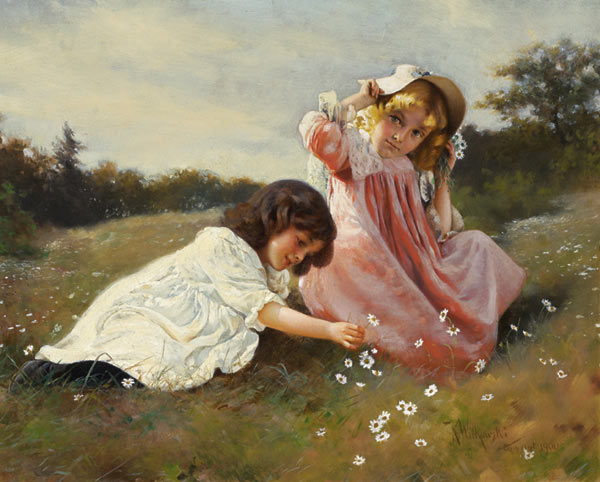
Gathering Daisies by Karl Witkowsi, 1900.

The name was in steady use for American girls throughout the 20th century and was ranked among the top 200 names for girls between 1900 and 1940. It declined in popularity between 1960 and 1980, but has been climbing in popularity since the 1980s and has again ranked among the top 200 names for American girls since 1990. It was the 294th most common name for all females during the 1990 United States census. Daisy has ranked among the top 100 names for girls in the United Kingdom since 1996 and in the past decade in Australia, Ireland, and New Zealand.

== People ==
- Daisy, Princess of Pless (1873–1943), socialite
- Daisy Agnes McGlashan, Scottish writer and illustrator
- Daisy Aitkens (born 1986), English actress, writer, and director
- Daisy Al-Amir (1935–2018), Iraqi writer, poet, and novelist
- Daisy Alik-Momotaro, Marshallese politician
- Daisy Andrews (c. 1934 or 1935–2015), Australian painter
- Daisy Ascher (1944–2003), Mexican photographer
- Daisy Ashford (1881–1972), English writer
- Daisy Avellana (1917–2013), Filipino stage actress and theater director
- Daisy Ba-ad, Filipino playwright, director, composer, motivational speaker, and life coach
- Daisy Bacon (1898–1986), American pulp fiction magazine editor and writer
- Daisy Baez (born 1959), American Democratic politician
- Daisy Bateman (born 2000), Australian rules footballer
- Daisy Bates (disambiguation), multiple people
- Daisy Beaumont (born 1974), English actress
- Daisy Belmore (1874–1954), British actress and singer
- Daisy Berbeco, American politician
- Daisy Radcliffe Beresford (1879–1939), British painter
- Daisy Betts (born 1982), Australian actress
- Daisy Bevan (born 1992), English actress
- Daisy Bindi (1904–1962), Aboriginal Australian Indigenous rights activist
- Daisy Blanche King (1875–1947), American painter and sculptor
- Daisy Bopanna (born 1982), Indian actress
- Daisy Burrell (1892–1982), English stage and film actress
- Daisy C. Allen, Utah state legislator and suffragist
- Daisy Calhoun (1863–1949), American socialite and hostess
- Daisy Campbell (disambiguation), multiple people
- Daisy Christodoulou, educational researcher
- Daisy Cleverley (born 1997), New Zealand footballer
- Daisy Cocco De Filippis (born 1949), American community college president
- Daisy Coleman (1997–2020), American sexual abuse victim advocate
- Daisy Cooper (born 1981), British politician
- Daisy Cordell (1885–1959), British silent film actress
- Daisy Coulam, British television producer and screenwriter
- Daisy Curwen (1889–1982), British swimmer
- Daisy D. Perkins, American lawyer
- Daisy Danjuma (born 1952), Nigerian politician
- Daisy Dares You (born 1993), British singer and songwriter
- Daisy Davis (1858–1902), American baseball pitcher
- Daisy de Bock (born 1974), Belgian sport shooter
- Daisy DeBolt (1945–2011), Canadian singer, musician, and songwriter
- Daisy Dee (born 1970), Dutch singer, actress, T.V. host, stylist, and television producer
- Daisy de Galard (1920–2007), French journalist and television producer
- Daisy de Melker (1886–1932), South African nurse
- Daisy de Peinder (born 1976), Dutch softball player
- Daisy Dern, American country music artist
- Daisy Devan (1928–2009), Singaporean businesswoman
- Daisy Dick (born 1972), British three-day eventing rider
- Daisy Donovan (born 1973), English television presenter, actress, and writer
- Daisy Door (born 1944), German Schlager music singer
- Daisy Dormer (1883–1947), English music hall singer
- Daisy Douglas Barr (1875–1938), Imperial Empress (leader) of the Indiana Women's Ku Klux Klan
- Daisy Dunn (born 1987), English author, classicist, and critic
- Daisy E. Nirdlinger (1879–1950), American businesswoman and children's book author
- Daisy Eagan (born 1979), American actress
- Daisy Earles (1907–1980), German actress
- Daisy Edgar-Jones (born 1998), English actress
- Daisy Ejang, Ugandan singer
- Daisy Elizabeth Adams Lampkin (1883–1965), American suffragist and civil rights activist
- Daisy Elizabeth McQuigg Sewell (1876–1944), American religious leader
- Daisy Elizabeth Platts-Mills (1868–1956), New Zealand doctor and community leader
- Daisy Elliott (1917–2015), African-American politician
- Daisy Campbell (born 1978), British writer, actress, and theatre director
- Daisy Exposito-Ulla, Cuban-born advertising agency executive
- Daisy Fancourt (born 1990), British researcher
- Daisy Fellowes (1890–1962), society beauty and fashion icon
- Daisy Fisher (1888–1967), English novelist and playwright
- Daisy Fried (born 1967), American poet
- Daisy Fuentes (born 1966), Cuban television host and model
- Daisy Gardner (born 1976), American television writer and comedian
- Daisy Gonzales, US academic administrator
- Daisy Goodwin (born 1961), British writer and television producer
- Daisy Grace, American woman accused in 1912 of killing her husband and found not guilty
- Daisy Granados (born 1942), Cuban film actress
- Daisy Greville, Countess of Warwick (1861–1938), British socialite and mistress of Albert Edward, Prince of Wales (later King Edward VII)
- Daisy Hage (born 1993), Dutch handball player
- Daisy Haggard (born 1978), British actress
- Daisy Harcourt, English comedian
- Daisy Hartsfield, American politician
- Daisy Hasan, Indian-English author from Meghalaya
- Daisy Hay, British writer
- Daisy Head (born 1991), English actress
- Daisy Hendley Gold (1893–1975), American writer, poet, and journalist
- Daisy Hernández (born 1975), American writer and editor
- Daisy Hernández Gaytán (born 1983), Mexican politician
- Daisy Hill Northcross (1881–1956), American physician, hospital administrator
- Daisy and Violet Hilton (1908–1969), English entertainers, who were conjoined twins
- Daisy Ho (born 1964), Hong Kong businesswoman
- Daisy Hooee (1906 or 1910–1994 or 1998), Hopi-Tewa potter
- Daisy Hurst Floyd (born 1956), American lawyer, law professor, and law school dean
- Daisy Igel (1926/1927–2019), Brazilian architect and billionaire heiress
- Daisy Irani (disambiguation), several people
- Daisy Jefferson (1889–1967), American actress
- Daisy Jelley, English model, actress and Internet personality
- Daisy Jenks (born 1991), English filmmaker and videographer
- Daisy Jepkemei (born 1996), Kazakhstan middle-distance runner
- Daisy Johnson (writer) (born 1990), British novelist and short story writer
- Daisy Jopling (born 1969), British classical/rock violinist
- Daisy Jugadai Napaltjarri (c. 1955 – 2008), Australian Indigenous artist
- Daisy Junor (1919–2012), Canadian baseball player
- Daisy Kadibil (1923–2018), Aboriginal Australian woman whose experiences shaped media
- Daisy Kaitano (born 1993), Zimbabwean footballer
- Daisy Kennedy (1893–1981), Australian-born concert violinist
- Daisy Kent, American television personality
- Daisy Kessler Biermann (1874–1963), magazine and newspaper writer, a painter, and a pianist
- Daisy Khan, Muslim activist
- Daisy Kyaw Win, Burmese actress
- Daisy L. Hobman (1891–1961), English writer, biographer and social worker
- Daisy L. Hung (born 1947), Taiwanese psychologist
- Daisy Lafarge, British poet and novelist
- Daisy Lang (born 1972), Bulgarian martial artist
- Daisy Lawler (born 1942), American politician
- Daisy Le Cren (1881–1951), New Zealand artist
- Daisy Lee Bitter (1928–2023), American science educator
- Daisy Lewis (born 1984), British actress and producer
- Daisy Li, Hong Kong journalist
- Daisy Linda Ward (1883–1937), American still life painter
- Daisy Li Yuet-Wah, Hong Kong journalist
- Daisy Lowe (born 1989), English fashion model
- Daisy Lúcidi (1929–2020), Brazilian actress
- Daisy Lumini (1936–1993), Italian composer, singer, and stage actress
- Daisy M. Cheatham, American actress, songwriter and vaudeville performer
- Daisy Makeig-Jones (1881–1945), pottery designer for Wedgwood, best known for her Fairyland Lustre series
- Daisy Mallory (born 1993), American country music singer-songwriter
- Daisy Marchisotti (1904–1987), Australian social and political activist
- Daisy Marguerite Hughes (1883–1968), American painter and lithographer
- Daisy Martey, British singer, songwriter, playwright, and screenwriter
- Daisy Martin (fl. c. 1914 – c. 1925), American actress and blues singer
- Daisy Martinez (born 1958?), actress, model, chef, host of the PBS T.V. show Daisy Cooks! and author
- Daisy Masterman (born 1990), Australian actress
- Daisy Maud Bellis (1887–1971), American painter
- Daisy Maude Orleman Robinson (1869–1942), American medical doctor decorated for her work during World War I
- Daisy May Cooper (born 1986), English actress and writer
- Daisy May Pratt Erd (1882–1925), Canadian-born American songwriter, composer, and naval veteran
- Daisy May Queen (born 1965), Argentine radio host, former television presenter, and writer
- Daisy McAndrew (born 1972), English journalist
- Daisy McCrackin (born 1981), American actress and singer-songwriter
- Daisy Molefe, South African judge
- Daisy Morales (born 1960), American politician
- Daisy Mullan, English cricketer
- Daisy Myers (1925–2011), African American educator
- Daisy Nakalyango (born 1994), Ugandan badminton player
- Daisy Nakaziro, Ugandan footballer
- Daisy Newman (1904–1994), American novelist
- Daisy Nyongesa (born 1989), Kenyan senator
- Daisy Ocasio (born 1964), Puerto Rican boxer and athlete
- Daisy Osakue (born 1996), Italian discus thrower
- Daisy Osborn (1888–1957), New Zealand painter, illustrator, and jewelry designer
- Daisy Parsons (1890–1957), British suffragette
- Daisy Pearce (born 1988), Australian footballer
- Daisy Pirovano (born 1977), Italian politician
- Daisy Platts-Mills (1868–1956), New Zealand doctor and community leader
- Daisy Polk (1874–1963), American-born French countess
- Daisy Postgate (1892–1971), British political activist
- Daisy Quezada Ureña (born 1990), American visual artist and educator
- Daisy Reyes (born 1976), Filipino beauty queen
- Daisy Richards Bisz (1909–2007), American attorney
- Daisy Ridgley (1909–?), English athlete
- Daisy Ridley (born 1992), British film and television actress
- Daisy Riley Lloyd (1928–2019), American politician
- Daisy di Robilant (died 1933), Italian noblewoman, fascist, feminist and campaigner
- Daisy Rockwell, American Hindi and Urdu language translator and artist
- Daisy Romualdez, Filipino actress
- Daisy Rosario, American public radio personality and producer
- Daisy Rossi (1879–1974), Australian artist, interior designer, and writer
- Daisy Roulland-Dussoix (1936–2014), Swiss molecular microbiologist
- Daisy Schjelderup (1916–1991), Norwegian translator and writer
- Daisy Shah (born 1984), Indian model, dancer, and film actress
- Daisy Smith (1891–1983), British artist
- Daisy Solomon (1882–1978), British suffragette
- Daisy Soros (born 1929), Hungarian-born American philanthropist
- Daisy Speranza, French tennis player
- Daisy St. John (1877–1956), English international badminton player
- Daisy McLaurin Stevens (1875–1950), American socialite and clubwoman
- Daisy Sweeney (1920–2017), Canadian Classical music and piano teacher
- Daisy Sylvan (1874–?), Italian film studio owner, producer, director, and actress in the silent era
- Daisy Syron Russell, English singer
- Daisy Tahan (born 2001), American actress
- Daisy Tapley (1882–1925), American classical singer and vaudeville performer
- Daisy Taugelchee, Navajo weaver
- Daisy Theresa Borne (1906–1998), British sculptor
- Daisy Torres (born 1956), Nicaraguan politician
- Daisy Tourné (1951–2022), Uruguayan politician
- Daisy Turner, (1883–1988), American storyteller and poet
- Daisy Vaithilingam (1925–2014), Singaporean social worker
- Daisy Veerasingham, British businesswoman and lawyer
- Daisy Voisin (1924–1991), Trinidad and Tobago singer and composer
- Daisy von Scherler Mayer (born 1966), American film and television director
- Daisy Voog (born 1932), Estonian-German mountain climber
- Daisy W. Okocha (born 1951), Nigerian lawyer
- Daisy Wai, Canadian politician
- Daisy Waite (born 2005), English-Chinese actress
- Daisy Walker (born 2002), Australian rules footballer
- Daisy Waterstone (born 1994), British actress
- Daisy Waugh (born 1967), English journalist, travel writer, novelist, and television presenter
- Daisy Webster (1911–2004), Canadian educator, author, and political figure
- Daisy Wende (1929–2025), Bolivian fashion designer
- Daisy Whitney, American multimedia reporter
- Daisy Wood (1877–1961), English music hall singer
- Daisy Wood-Davis (born 1990), British singer and actress
- Daisy Wood Hildreth (1879/1880–1969), American composer
- Daisy Yen Wu (1902–1993), Chinese biologist
- Daisy Youngblood (born 1945), American sculptor and ceramicist
- Daisy Zamora (born 1950), Latin American poet

== Animals ==
- Daisy (1993–2006), a dog belonging to Rudolph Moshammer
- Daisy (dog actor) (1937–1960), who appeared in 50 Hollywood films
- Daisy (Meerkat Manor), a meerkat in the series Meerkat Manor
- Daisy, an orangutan in the series Orangutan Island

== Fictional characters ==
- Daisy Adair, a character in Dead Like Me
- Daisy Bell, an 1892 song involving a bicycle built for two
- Daisy Buchanan, in F. Scott Fitzgerald's novella The Great Gatsby
- Daisy Carter, from the American CBS soap opera The Young and the Restless
- Daisy the Diesel Rail-Car, diesel railcar, painted green with yellow lining from the Rev. W. Awdry's The Railway Series
- Daisy Duck, a Walt Disney cartoon and comic book character, first appearing in 1940
- Daisy Duke, from The Dukes of Hazzard
- Daisy Fitzroy, leader of the Vox Populi in BioShock Infinite
- Daisy Johnson, a Marvel Comics superheroine
- Daisy Mason, a kitchen maid in the TV series Downton Abbey
- Daisy Midgeley, a character from Coronation Street
- Daisy Steiner, a character in Spaced
- Daisy, from the British comedy television series Keeping Up Appearances, portrayed by actress Judy Cornwell
- Daisy , a railway engine in the television series Thomas the Tank Engine
- Princess Daisy, a character in the Super Mario series
- Daisy, a character from Toy Story 3
- Daisy, Charlie's porn star client in Californication
- Daisy, animated tall orange/yellow/green daisy in Oswald

== See also ==
- Daisy (nickname), people with the nickname Daisy
