= Daisy (nickname) =

Daisy is the nickname of the following people:

- Daisy Ashford (1881–1972), English writer and author of The Young Visiters, when she was nine-years-old
- Daisy Basham (1879–1963), New Zealand radio broadcaster
- Daisy Dick (born 1972), Bronze medalist for Great Britain in team eventing at the 2008 Summer Olympics in Beijing
- Daisy Lang (born 1972), Bulgarian professional female boxer and former Super Bantamweight and Super Flyweight world champion
- Juliette Gordon Low (1860–1927), founder of Girl Scouts of the USA
- Daisy Lumini (1936–1993), Italian composer, singer and stage actress
- Daisy Makeig-Jones (1881–1945), English pottery designer for Wedgwood best known for her "Fairyland Lustre" series
- Daisy Romualdez, Filipino actress
- Daisy Sylvan (1874–unknown), Italian film studio owner, producer, director, and actress in the silent film era
- Margrethe II of Denmark (born 1940), Monarch of The Kingdom of Denmark

== See also ==
- Daisy (disambiguation)
- Daisy (given name)
