= Daisy Jones =

Daisy Jones may refer to:

- Daisy Edgar-Jones, a British actress
- Daisy Jones & The Six, an American musical drama streaming television miniseries
- Daisy Jones & the Six (novel), the novel on which the television series is based
- Daisy Makeig-Jones, pottery designer

== See also ==
- Daisy (given name), including a list of people and fictional characters with the name
- List of people with surname Jones, including fictional characters
