= Susan Collett =

Canadian artist (born 1961)

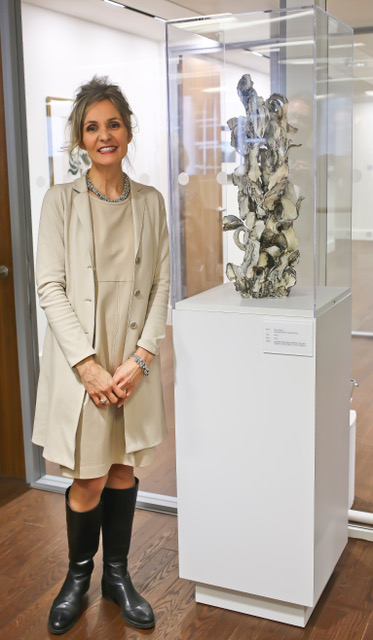
- Susan Collett with "Axis" at Canada House, London, 2015.
- Born: 1961 (age 64–65)
- Education: Cleveland Institute of Art, Ohio, U.S.A. BFA Printmaking/Ceramics Minor
- Known for: Hand-built clay sculpture, drypoint monoprints
- Awards: Agnes Gund Memorial Award, (USA 1986) Winifred Shantz Award for Ceramics (Canada 2001)
- Elected: Royal Canadian Academy of Arts (RCA) International Academy of Ceramics (IAC)

Susan Collett RCA IAC is a Canadian artist in printmaking and ceramics. In 1986, she graduated from the Cleveland Institute of Art, earning a B.F.A. in printmaking with a minor in ceramics.

== Early life and career ==
Collett began formal arts education in 1980 at the Central Technical School, graduating in 1982. She then began studies at the Cleveland Institute of Art, graduating with a B.F.A. in 1986, following with an apprenticeship as studio assistant to American ceramic artist Judith Salomon.

Since 2003, Collett has operated a studio in Toronto, focusing on large-scale clay sculpture and monoprints. Her ceramic work employs paper clay and nichrome wire substrate. Her monoprints are made from plates of stitched industrial-grade copper.

== Career ==
Collett exhibited at the Toronto International Art Fair (2013) and at SOFA exhibitions in Miami, Chicago, and New York. Gyeonggi International Ceramic Biennale 2009 Korea and the Taiwan Ceramics Biennale 2012.

In 2009, Collett was invited by the Ceramic Artists Association of Israel to conduct a master workshop in Neot HaKikar near the Dead Sea, as well as exhibiting at the Gardiner Museum of Ceramic Art, China Academy of Art, and Concordia University. Collett's work has been reviewed in publications such as Ceramic Review and Canadian Art. Collett's work is included in the permanent collections of the Gardiner Museum and the Montreal Museum of Fine Arts. Her technical process involves the use of paper clay and nichrome wire substrates.

=== Awards ===
Collett has received research grants from the Canada Council for the Arts (2023) and the Toronto Arts Council (2019). In 2001, she won the Winifred Shantz Award for Ceramics.

=== Collections ===
- Canadian Clay and Glass Gallery (2004, 2008, 2024)
- The Gardiner Museum of Ceramic Art (2008, 2023 & 2024)
- Arizona State University Art Museum, USA (2021)
- Canada House, Trafalgar Square London (2015)
- Montreal Museum of Fine Arts (2015)
- The Four Seasons Hotel, Toronto (2012)
- Sèvres Porcelain Museum, Paris, France (2010)
- Crown Collection, Crown Collection (Canada), (2012)
- The Canadiana Collection of the Official Residencies of Ottawa, Rideau Hall (2009)

=== Elected associations ===
She received her letters from the International Academy of Ceramics in 2007, and from the RCA, Royal Canadian Academy of Arts in 2008.

== Exhibitions ==
- Gardiner Museum Of Ceramic Art, International Ceramic Art Fair (ICAF), June 2023
- Canadian Clay and Glass Gallery, Waterloo, Ontario, Essence, January–May 2023
- Boise Art Museum, Idaho, USA, Summer 2021 opening
- Fuller Craft Museum, Boston, Massachusetts USA, January 7–May 30, 2021
- Nora Eccles Harrison Museum of Art 2020, Utah State University, International Exhibition: Particle & Wave - Paper Clay Illuminated, January 24–May 2, 2020
- Arizona State University Art Museum, Tempe Arizona, USA June 22–September 21, 2019
- Daum Museum of Contemporary Art, Sedalia Missouri, USA October 12–December 15, 2019
- Belger Art Center, Kansas City, Mo. U.S.A., NCECA group invitational, Linda Lighton curator (2016)
- Toronto International Art Fair, Sandra Ainsley Gallery, Toronto, gallery artists feature (2015)
- Toronto International Art Fair, Sandra Ainsley Gallery, Toronto, Gallery Artists Feature (2014)
- Gardiner Museum, Why Make in China? Invitational, clay (2012)
- New Mexico Museum of Art, Santa Fe, New Mexico, "New World: Timeless Visions", international juried (2012)
- Canadian Clay & Glass Gallery, Ontario, Invitational, Terra Firma "Groundbreakers in Canadian Clay"(2011)

== Publications ==
- Louisa Taylor, UK, 2011, The Ceramics Bible, USA Edition, Chronicle Books, page 74
- Emmanuel Cooper, UK, 2009, Contemporary Ceramics, Thames & Hudson page 89
- Guy Lavigueur, QC. 2016, Ateliers/Studios of Royal Canadian Academy of Arts, Marquis Imprimer, Quebec, page 122, 123
- Ed Phillips, Canada, 2005, Ernst & Young Great Canadian Printmaking Collection, Ernst & Young LLP, page 37, 48

=== Exhibition catalogues ===
- Brennpunkt Keramik II, 2020 catalogue, cover image & page 20
- Desire, Feb-May 2016, Kansas City, Missouri, Belger Art Centre, pages 8, 13, 28, 29
- Three Canadians Reflect on the Natural World, November 2016-January 2017, Kean University Art Galleries, pages 5, 6, 10-31, 68, 69
- Naked Craft Canada/Scotland, June 2015/ April 2016, Art Gallery of Burlington, Centre Materia, Art Gallery of Nova Scotia, Scotland (various) pages 42, 43
- Canadian Art Installation 2015, Aimia Canada, May 2015, pages 24, 45, 109, 171
- Canada House Trafalgar Square, Canadian High Commission to the UK, February 2015, Trafalgar Square, London UK, page 90
- GICB 2015, 8th Gyeonggi International Ceramic Biennale, 2015, Icheon World Ceramic Centre, Korea, pages 96, 97
- Caméléon, October 2015, McClure Gallery, Montreal, pages 14–27
- Toronto International Art Fair, October 2013, Toronto Convention Centre, Canada, pages 44, 45
- Taiwan International Ceramics Biennale, 2012, New Taipei City, Yingge Ceramics Museum page 97
- Circuit Ceramique a Sèvres, September 2010, Sèvres Porcelain Museum, page 146
- Ceramic Visions, April 2009, International, 5th World Ceramic Biennale, Gyeonggi Province, Korea, pages 111, 241

=== Articles ===
- Brennpunkt Keramik II, 2020 catalogue, Introduction Essay by Monika Gass, Curator: Nicole Nix-Hauck- Stadtische Galerie, Neunkirchen, Germany
- Hannelore Sieffert, Winter 2019, New Ceramics: The European Ceramics Magazine, Germany, Volume #3, page 54
- Nathalie Roy, winter 2014-2015, “La Ceramique d’art Contemporaine: Le contre-pied des idees recues, Vies Des Arts, issue 237, pages 72, 73
- Heidi McKenzie, April 2013, “Go East” Canadians Create in China, Ceramics Monthly, USA, volume 61 #4, pages 45–47
- Barry Morrison, June 2014, Studio Ceramics Canada, Online
- Adina Balint-Babos July–August 2011, “Figuration & Abstraction” Ceramic Review UK, Issue 250, pages 60–63
- Kristen den Hartog, November 2008 – April 2009, “Canadians in China”, Ceramics Technical, Australia, Issue 27, pages 83–88
- Kristen den Hartog, March- May 2007 “Impluvium”, Ceramics Art & Perception, Australia, Spring Issue 67, pages 52–54
- Virginia Eichhorn, Spring 2007, Impluvium, Espace Sculpture, QC Spring Issue 79, pages 37, 38
- Kristen den Hartog, August 2006, “Air & Grace”, Ceramic Review, UK, Issue 220, pages 28–29
