= Daisy Allen =

Daisy Allen may refer to:

- Daisy C. Allen (1881–1942), state legislator in Utah
- Mary Daisy White (1873–1958), also known as Daisy Allen, American politician and business owner in Nevada
- Daisy Allen Story (1858–1932), née Fanny Ella Daisy Allen, American socialite, clubwoman, and suffragist
