= Hong Kong Inmedia =

Hong Kong news website

- Type: Online-only news
- Founder(s): Oiwan Lam; Ip Iam-chong
- Editor-in-chief: Oiwan Lam
- Founded: 2004
- Political alignment: Pro-democracy
- Language: Chinese
- Headquarters: Wan Chai, Hong Kong
- Website: www.inmediahk.net

Hong Kong Inmedia (Chinese: 獨立媒體) is a Hong Kong-based news website established in 2004. After the shutdown of Apple Daily, Stand News, and Citizen News in the aftermath of the 2019–2020 Hong Kong protests, Inmedia was widely regarded as the last surviving pro-democratic media outlet in Hong Kong. In a 2022 survey from the Chinese University of Hong Kong, Inmedia was listed as the most credible online media outlet in Hong Kong.

== History ==
Inmedia was founded by Oiwan Lam and Ip Iam-chong in late 2004, during a wave of emerging pro-democratic online news platforms and podcasts following the 2003 protests. Eddie Chu and Chow Sze-chung were among the first batch of journalists recruited by Inmedia. Embracing the ideology of citizen journalism, Inmedia primarily covers political news and adopts an opposing perspective to government-funded newspapers and online media. Its expenses are sustained through readers' subscriptions and public donations. Inmedia gained public recognition for its extensive coverage of the Korean peasants' protests against the World Trade Organization during the 2005 Ministerial Conference.

In 2012, Inmedia was involved in a defamation lawsuit brought against it by Oriental Daily News, which resulted in a loss for Inmedia and a fine of HK$100,000. The same year, the company's headquarters were targeted and sabotaged by a group of paid thugs. Journalists also received threat calls shortly after the incident. Prior to March 2013, the company transitioned from operating as a limited company in Hong Kong to Nevada, United States, and functioning as an offshore company.

In 2019, in response to the assault and mistreatment of journalists by the Hong Kong Police Force during the 2019–2020 Hong Kong protests, Inmedia, along with Stand News, RTHK, Ming Pao, am730, and Initium Media, jointly held a silent protest during a police press conference. In December 2020, Inmedia's social media renamed from "香港獨立媒體" (lit. Hong Kong Independent Media) to "獨立媒體" (lit. Independent Media), an apparent move to prevent showing "Hong Kong independence" and to avoid accusations of sedition. The outlet said they registered as "獨立媒體" with the government in 2017 because the logo does not include the characters of "香港". While declining to comment whether the move was related to the new national security law, Inmedia said the name of the parent company is still with "香港獨立媒體".

In 2021, the Hong Kong Police Force conducted a search of Inmedia's offices for documents related to Hong Kong 47. Following the shutdown of Apple Daily, Stand News, and Citizen News, Inmedia was widely regarded as one of the last independent pro-democratic media outlets remaining in Hong Kong. According to a 2022 survey conducted by the Chinese University of Hong Kong, Inmedia ranked first in terms of credibility among online media outlets in Hong Kong. In the same year, Inmedia was barred from attending and covering activities of the Hong Kong government. In May 2025, the Hong Kong Journalists Association stated that Inmedia, alongside seven other local media outlets, their employees and their family members, has been subject to a tax audit by the Inland Revenue Department.

== See also ==
- Media in Hong Kong
