= Daisy Quezada Ureña =

American visual artist and educator (born 1990)

Daisy Quezada Ureña (born 1990) is an American visual artist and educator. She was born in California and is based in Santa Fe, New Mexico. Informed through her Mexican-American cultural background, Quezada addresses social issues including immigration, gender inequality, labor, and class issues. She creates ceramic and fabric works and installations that speak on themes of identity and place in relation to social structures and imposed borders.

== Life and career ==
Quezada was born in California and spent her childhood in Mexico where her family is from. She moved back to the United States where her family intended for her and her two sisters to attend school. Quezada enrolled on a tennis scholarship to the College of Santa Fe which then became the Santa Fe University of Art and Design (SFUAD) during her second year, and received her BFA focusing on sculpture and ceramics. She continued her education, receiving MFA at University of Delaware, with full scholarship.

Quezada moved back to Santa Fe in 2014 where she is currently living and working. Since then, she has worked at SFUAD in various roles, exhibited in major shows regionally and internationally, completed a residency at Santa Fe Art Institute, and received a Fulcrum Fund grant. She has engaged with public school students throughout this time, gathering garments and stories.

== Selected exhibitions and projects ==
=== Exhibitions ===
- 2017 Mi Tierra: Contemporary Artists Explore Place, Denver Art Museum, Denver, Colorado
- 2017 Crafted Stranger, The Center for Craft Creativity & Design, Asheville, NC
- 2016 Concept: Taiwan Ceramics Biennale, New Taipei City Yingge Ceramics Museum, New Taipei, Taiwan
- 2016 Local Workshop Exhibition - Icheon Ceramic Festival, Icheon, Gyeonggi Province, South Korea
- 2015 Two by two: Small Scale Ceramics Sculpture Biennial, Gallery of Art, Cheney, Washington
- 2014 UN SILENCIO, Philadelphia Sculpture Gym, Philadelphia, Pennsylvania
- 2014 A Place of Insight, Pocket Utopia, New York, New York
- 2013 1759, Summerhall, Edinburgh, Scotland, United Kingdom
- 2012 New Blood, The Crane, Philadelphia, Pennsylvania
- 2012 Nona, Santa Fe University Fine Arts Gallery, Santa Fe, New Mexico

=== Projects ===
Quezada has also worked alongside non-for-profit organizations such as El Otro Lado/The Other Side and Downtown Aurora Visual Arts that bring art to youth at a local level. In 2016 Quezada was one of the cofounders of Present Cartographers, a collective invested in creating a platform for artists working within the theme of immigration. Most recently the collective launched Terreno: Borderland Linguistics, a chapbook of writing and visual work by ten national and international artists.
