= Daisy Hill Northcross =

American physician (1881–1956)

- Daisy Hill Northcross, from a 1942 book
- Born: December 9, 1881; Montgomery, Alabama, US
- Died: January 10, 1956 (aged 75); Detroit, Michigan, US
- Occupations: Physician, hospital administrator
- Known for: Co-founder of Detroit's Mercy General Hospital in 1917

Daisy Hill Northcross (December 9, 1881 – January 10, 1956) was an American physician and hospital administrator, based in Detroit, Michigan.

== Early life ==
Daisy L. Hill was born in Montgomery, Alabama, the daughter of William M. Hill and Frances Fair Hill. She trained as a teacher in Montgomery in 1899, then earned a bachelor's degree at Temple University in Philadelphia in 1902, and completed her medical degree in 1913 at Bennett Medical College in Chicago. She was the second Black woman to apply for a medical license in Alabama.

== Career ==
Northcross taught elocution and vocal music as a young woman. She and her husband ran a sanitarium in Alabama. They moved from Montgomery to Detroit in 1916, as part of the Great Migration. The following year opened the city's first Black-owned and operated hospital, Detroit Mercy General Hospital, slightly before the establishment of the larger Dunbar Hospital. They also ran a drugstore, a hotel, and a nurses' training program.

Daisy Northcross took over the hospital's management when her husband was fatally stabbed by a tenant in 1933. She was assisted by other medically trained members of her family, including her nephew Remus G. Robinson, her son David, and his wife. She was also active in church and club activities in Detroit, and in the YWCA. She judged a Healthiest Baby Contest in 1954.

== Personal life ==
Daisy Hill married a fellow Alabama-born doctor, David Caneen Northcross, in 1909. They had three children, Gloria, David, and Wilson. Their son David Jr. (1917–2009) also became a physician in Detroit, and his wife Ophelia Burnett Northcross (1926–2019) was a nurse. Daisy Hill Northcross died in 1956, aged 75 years, after abdominal surgery in Detroit.
