= Daisy Campbell =

Daisy Campbell may refer to:

- Daisy Campbell (silent film actress) (fl. 1921–1929), British actress
- Daisy Campbell (theatre director) (born 1978), British writer, actress and theatre director
- Daisy Campbell (actress, born 2003), British actress
