= Daisy Marchisotti =

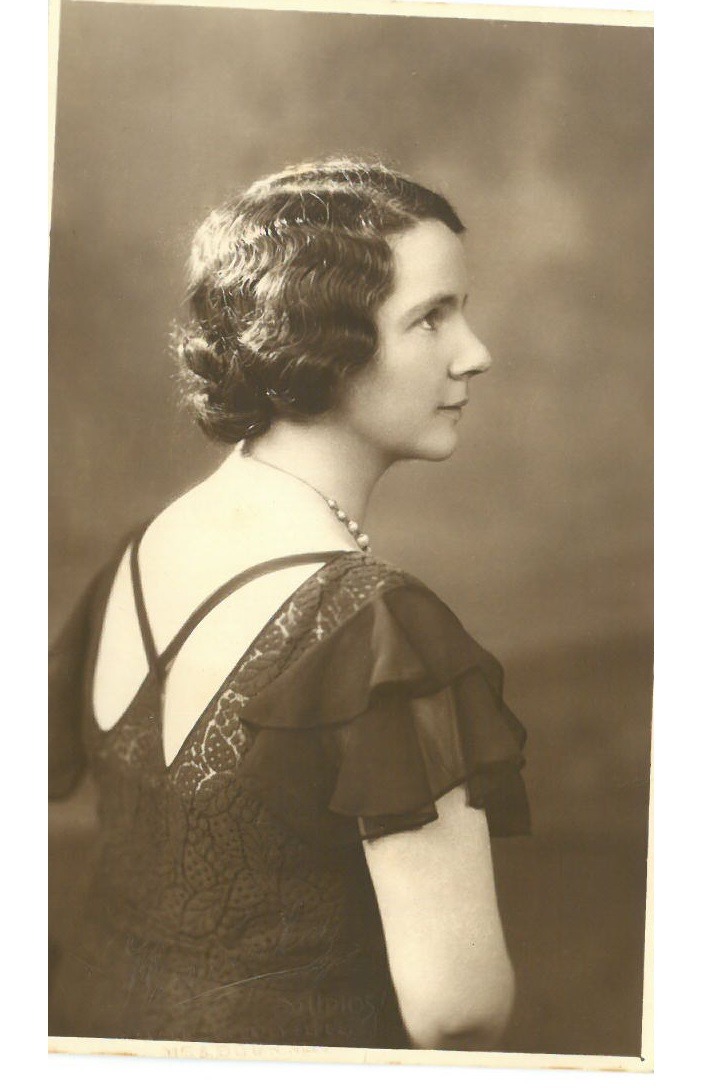
Daisy Marchisotti 22 September 1922 (custom postcard)

Daisy Elizabeth Marchisotti (née Iriving) (28 September 1904 – 1987) was an Australian social and political activist whose commitment to Indigenous rights saw her remain an active member of the political community up until her death in 1987. She is known for her communist affiliations and was an active member of the Communist Party of Australia.

== Biography ==
Marchisotti graduated from Macedon Elementary School in her hometown of Melbourne in 1918. Marchisotti demonstrated a wide range of interests from a very young age, authoring personal diaries and learning music. Marchisotti had achieved a grade four in theory of music in 1925 at the age of 21 years. In 1934, by the time she was 30 years old, she graduated from the University of Melbourne although details about her final qualification are unclear.

Marchisotti was passionate about public affairs. She worked voluntarily for the Civil Defence Organization of Melbourne during the period of national emergency during World War II. In addition, she qualified in First Aid and Injuries and Air Raid Precautions which were certified by the St. John Ambulance Association and the Victorian State Emergency Council respectively.

Marchisotti developed an interest in left-wing politics in the 1940s and became an active member among many social movements. She had previously worked as a stenographer and typist from 1926, up until 1948. During this time, she advanced her interest in social equality, eventually becoming a member of the Communist Party of Australia (CPA) in 1951, resigning from a better-paying office job. After moving to Brisbane Marchisotti met Luigi Marchisotti; the couple married on 10 November 1949.

The case for Equal Pay in Australia was one of Marchisotti's most notable achievements as a social activist. Despite proving ultimately unsuccessful, Marchisotti had prepared a thorough case and media at the time were taken aback at her ability to present convincing evidence and arguments.

In 1964, Marchisotti became a member of the CPA women's delegation to the Soviet Union.

Marchisotti also took an active interest in Indigenous affairs and was involved with the Queensland sub-branch of the Federal Council for the Advancement of Aborigines and Torres Strait Islanders (FCAATSI). She edited the Federal Council's newsletter and wrote articles on Indigenous issues for both FCAATSI and the CPA. On 7 October 1982, Marchisotti participated in a street march to expose issues of racism in the 1982 Commonwealth Games. More than 200 people were arrested, including Marchisotti.

== Communist Party of Australia ==
The CPA was founded in Sydney in October 1920, by a group of socialists inspired by the reports of revolution coming out of the USSR at the time. The CPA aimed to introduce many of the same ideologies to Australian politics. While the party remained relatively minor in terms of challenging Australia's political landscape, it did register significant influence in the formation of trade unions.

In 1922 the CPA became affiliated with the Communist International, an organisation that rejected colonialism and imperialism, instead championing the rights of minorities. For the CPA, transferring this ideology to an Australian context meant the struggles of the Australian Indigenous community became a specific area of interest. The struggles of the Indigenous community was a cause to which Marchisotti dedicated most of her working life. It is unsurprising then that Marchisotti had been a long time sympathiser with the communist movement in Australia before officially joining the CPA in 1941. Her commitment to the party and its approach to politics is one of the few aspects of Marchisotti's professional life that is reasonably well documented however there is little substantive evidence of the specifics of her work for the party. It is clear however that most of her work was related to the fight for equality for Indigenous Australians. Marchisotti's involvement with the CPA also gave her the opportunity to participate in feminist-driven campaigns that were aimed at improving the lived experiences of women, whether that be in the home or work place. “I hate capitalism… Look at the tortures throughout the world… Sometimes I lay awake at night worrying about some injustices. In the morning I have to act in some way. If you have any humanity in you, you must do something.”.

== Equal Pay Case ==
In 1950, the Court of Conciliation and Arbitration set the female rate of pay at 75% of the male rate. In the 1950s, men usually worked full-time, with an unfair social norm which 'permitted' men to discriminate against women in Australian society. Women in the workforce were often limited to jobs such as nurses, teachers, and receptionists. Not surprisingly, they were usually paid less than men

In 1951, the Queensland Branch of the Clerks Union placed a claim for Equal Pay to the Industrial Court of Queensland. This was an unusual case which came about after continual pressure on the executive (by membership of the Clerks Union) proved futile; 'too busy to prepare a case' was the excuse offered to the activists. Marchisotti, a member of the union, undertook the research with the support of Berenice Collins, another member, and Val Howard, a clerk in the Sheet Metal Workers' Union Office.

Marchisotti had prepared a complete case, gathering all the information provided from experienced people plus a great mass of figures and other information obtained from the Australian Bureau of Statistics. In regards to her preparation for the case, Marchisotti has been quoted: “I was hellishly nervous, but my voice is pretty strong and I was always good at reading. I read the whole ten pages of the submission, bar the tables, which I had typed and carefully double-checked". Marchisotti finalised her submission by requesting a ‘rate for the job’ regardless of sex and stating the reasons for this demand. Aside from Berenice and Val, Joan Riordan, an extreme right-winger, the only woman branch councillor in the union, showed up at the Industrial Court where the case was being heard. The court was also filled with journalists, members from the Union of Australian Women and the President of the National Council of Women, Mrs Byth. Mrs Byth even asked for permission to intervene the case as it significantly mattered to women. When the case was over, reporters and newspapermen were amazed that a woman could put up such a convincing case.

Justice Matthews tried to get the witnesses to agree that women were not just ordinary clerical workers, but quite above average in intelligence and thus might be underpaid. Despite the evidence provided, the judges decided this had not proved that all females in the industry were "performing the same work as males or producing the same return of profit to their employers". This judgement raised significant public concern. People considered it an unfair ruling and claimed it was obvious that they were determined to refuse the claim regardless of the presented evidence. The judgement concluded that it was "most difficult to prove that women produced the same profit as men" deciding there was insufficient reason to approve the claim.

Unfortunately, Marchisotti had difficulty in obtaining employment following the case due to the amount of negative publicity generated by her involvement.

== Involvement with Indigenous Affairs ==
In addition to her communist affiliation, Marchisotti was also dedicated to Indigenous affairs in Australia, especially from a feminist standpoint. As a result, she became an industrious member of the Federal Council for the Advancement of Aborigines and Torres Strait Islanders (FCAATSI), as well as its Queensland sub-branch (QCAATSI). During her time working for these organisations she edited the council newsletter and wrote articles on Indigenous issues for use by both organisations.

=== Federal Council for the Advancement of Aborigines and Torres Strait Islanders (FCAATSI) ===
During February 1958, a group of individuals travelled to Adelaide to form a federal body to advocate the removal of racist and discriminatory state legislation across the country. Although there was no recognised Aboriginal representative from Queensland at this meeting, the state was represented by the Queensland United Council for Aboriginal Welfare; this collective would evolve into QCAATSI, which Marchisotti would become heavily involved in. Marchisotti would also work closely with noted feminist and Indigenous political activist Oodgeroo Noonuccal, who worked as the Queensland State Secretary of QCAATSI in the 1960s. Initially, the establishment of FCAATSI comprised a diverse range of activists, ranging from feminists, Christians, communists and peace activists. FCAATSI would progress to play a critical role in Aboriginal affairs in Australia, including establishing the 1967 referendum to amend the constitution, as well as the petitioning for inclusion of Aboriginal families within the census.

=== Queensland Council for the Advancement of Aborigines and Torres Strait Islanders (QCAATSI) ===
In 1958, noted feminist and social justice campaigner Ada Bromham unified Queensland social activists from existing Indigenous organisations (including Marchisotti) to form the QCAATSI. Rather than act as a separate entity to FCAATSI however, this movement effectively acted as the state branch of the federal organisation. Despite some members accusing QCAATSI of too closely adopting communist influence, the QCAATSI enjoyed extensive active membership from noted Indigenous rights campaigners for many years. Among Marchisotti, these included Kathy Cochrane (with whom Marchisotti frequently exchanged letters) Celia Smith and Rodney Hall. As a reflection of this, the council enjoyed a cooperative relationship with other existing Indigenous activist groups, such as the Cairns Aborigines and Torres Strait Islanders Advancement League (CATSIAL). QCAATSI worked closely with the federal council on matters of national integrity, but largely took an inclusive approach in developing individual movements, preferring to deliberate with other organisations and individuals in terms of constitutional reform. Nonetheless, in 1961, a split developed among those members considered heavily communist in political orientation (including Marchisotti), who were prepared to challenge Queensland legislation, and others who were less prepared to take an active stance. This latter group formed the One People of Australia League (OPAL), consisting primarily of mainstream Christian and traditionalist idealists. From this point, OPAL was one of the few groups to remain overtly distinct from QCAATSI, preferring to negotiate and liaise with the Queensland government, rather than perform overt political activism. Marchisotti, remaining with QCAATSI, assisted in organising the fourth annual conference of the Federal Council for Aboriginal Advancement, held at the University of Queensland in 1961. She also continued to publish Aboriginal rights articles on behalf of both QCAATSI and the CPA. It was at this time that Marchisotti also began drafting her only book to be published by the CPA: Land Rights: The Black Struggle. Marchisotti continued her publication of articles until the very latter stages of life; her last confirmed publication was made in the June 1980 edition of the Tribune, with Marchisotti aged 75.

== Arrest ==
On Thursday 7 October 1982, Marchisotti joined a protest by Aboriginal people and others outside a Commonwealth Games venue in Brisbane. The 1982 games, in particular, had been noted as experiencing widespread Aboriginal protests throughout their duration, in attempt by activists to bring the lack of land rights, poor living conditions and the suppression of political voice to an international audience. Marchisotti was arrested for her involvement in the protests and for disobeying an explicit police instruction, resulting in a fine of fifty dollars. Marchisotti's fine notice lists her offence simply as "Br. S.36 (b) traffic act". Upon her appearance before a magistrate in Brisbane, she has been quoted as saying "I am seventy-eight years old and a pensioner. I did not take part in my action lightly. [It was] my belief that the only way to change Queensland's racist laws was to take the action I did".

== List of Publications ==
While it is known that Marchisotti was a prolific and dedicated writer, especially during her time with the CPA and particularly the FCAATSI where she took on the role of editor for their newsletter there seems to be very little of her published work available in the public domain.

Countless drafts and copies of articles submitted to various publications, including the Tribune, The Courier Mail and The Guardian, can be found in Marchisotti's personal archives however this information cannot be verified as most of these articles are only attached to personal letters. There is no confirmation of what was published or when, if at all. However the following three works have been published are available in the public domain:

1. In 1978 the CPA published Marchisotti's book Land Rights: The Black Struggle which has since become a seminal text on the topic of Indigenous land rights issues.
2. Marchisotti, Daisy 'Environment week success for Aborigines'. Tribune. 25 June 1980 1980-06-25. 9.
3. Marchisotti, Daisy 'Equal pay case, 1951'. Women, Class and History: Feminist Perspectives on Australia, 1788–1978. 1980. 423–429.

== Further references ==
- Marchisotti (Irving), Daisy Elizabeth – Volume 1, 1953 – 1964, 3105; Australian Security Intelligence Organization Files; National Archives of Australia, National Office.
- Marchisotti (Irving), Daisy Elizabeth – Volume 2, 1953 – 1964, 3106; Australian Security Intelligence Organization Files; National Archives of Australia, National Office.
- Marchisotti, Daisy Elizabeth – Volume 3, 1964 – 1966, 3117; Australian Security Intelligence Organization Files; National Archives of Australia, National Office.
- Marchisotti, Daisy Elizabeth – Volume 4, 1966, 3118; Australian Security Intelligence Organization Files; National Archives of Australia, National Office.
- Marchisotti, Daisy Elizabeth – Volume 5, 1966 – 1968, 3119; Australian Security Intelligence Organization Files; National Archives of Australia, National Office.
- Marchisotti (Irving), Daisy Elizabeth – Volume 6, 1968 – 1969, 3147; Australian Security Intelligence Organization Files; National Archives of Australia, National Office.
- Marchisotti (Irving), Daisy Elizabeth – Volume 7, 1969 – 1970, 3148; Australian Security Intelligence Organization Files; National Archives of Australia, National Office.
- Marchisotti, Daisy. “Personal references, certificates, memberships, etc”. Papers of Daisy Marchisotti. UQFL 156. Box 1. Fryer Library: University of Queensland Library.
- Daisy Marchisotti Entry on the Australian Women's Register.
