= Daisy Whitney =

American young adult fiction author and journalist

- Education: Brown University
- Occupations: Author and journalist
- Writing career
- Genre: Young adult fiction

Daisy Whitney is an American young adult fiction author and multimedia reporter. Her novels include The Mockingbirds, The Rivals, When You Were Here, Starry Nights, and The Fire Artist.

== Biography ==
Whitney has a 1994 degree in art history from Brown University. In 2007, while working as a reporter for TelevisionWeek, Whitney created the webcast "New Media Minute" with her videographer husband, broadcast on BeetTV.com, iMedia and other sites.

She has published several young adult fiction novels. The Mockingbirds was published in 2010, followed by its sequel The Rivals in 2012. In 2013, she published When You Were Here, which she has said was in part inspired by the film Lost in Translation. Starry Nights was also published in 2013, followed by The Fire Artist in 2014.

== Books ==
- When You Were Here, Little, Brown and Company, 2013, ISBN 978-0-316-20974-8
- The Mockingbirds, Little, Brown and Company, 2012, ISBN 978-0-316-09053-7
- Starry Nights, Bloomsbury. 2013, ISBN 978-1-61963-133-5
