= Daisy Maud Bellis =

American painter (1887–1971)

- Born: February 16, 1887; Waltham, Massachusetts, U.S.
- Died: April 1971 (aged 84); California, U.S.
- Other names: D. Maud Bellis, Daisy Maude Bellis
- Occupation(s): Artist, art teacher

Daisy Maud Bellis (February 16, 1887 – April 1971) was an American painter and art teacher associated with the Works Progress Administration.

== Early llife and education ==
Bellis was born in Waltham, Massachusetts, the daughter of Edward Bellis and Mary M. Brown Bellis. Her birthplace has also been given as Branford, Connecticut, where she later lived. Her father was a jeweler; both of parents were both born in England. She studied at the Massachusetts College of Art, the University of Vermont, and the Breckenridge School of Painting, with further lessons at institutions in Montreal and Paris.

== Career ==
In the 1910s, Bellis taught art in Massachusetts and Ohio. In the 1920s, Bellis taught art at Montpelier Seminary in Vermont, and made and exhibited portraits and landscape paintings and etchings. She was involved with the Works Progress Administration in the 1930s, teaching art and painting around eighty pieces for the Federal Arts Project. Her paintings were executed mainly in oils and watercolor, and were parceled out to institutions in Laurel Heights, Undercliff, and Cedarcrest, the Connecticut State Farm for Women at Niantic, the Middlesex County Temporary Home, and Fairfield Hills Hospital. She also taught art at Salem College in North Carolina, and at Macdonald College of McGill University.

Bellis was elected a Fellow of the Royal Society of Arts in 1936. She lived and worked in the San Francisco Bay area in her later years. In 1951, she was a soprano in the chorus of an English-language production of Aida by the Berkeley Opera Workshop.

== Personal life and legacy ==
Bellis died in 1971, at the age of 84, in California. The Connecticut State Library has cataloged much of her work, and made an online album of her known works for the WPA.
