= Daisy Nyongesa =

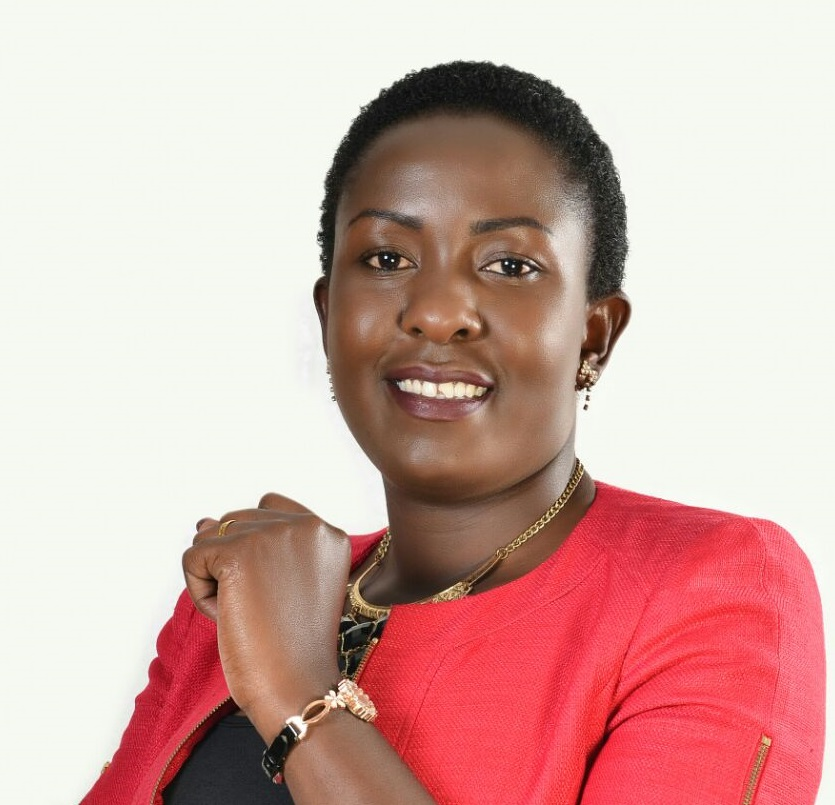
Daisy Kanainza Nyongesa

Daisy Kanainza Nyongesa (born 23 January 1989), is a nominated senator in the Senate of Kenya, representing the youth on an Orange Democratic Movement party (ODM) ticket.

== Early life and education ==
Daisy Kanainza Nyongesa was born on 23 January 1989 in Vinyenya village, Likuyani constituency western Kenya. She went to Patrice Primary School then Silver Bells Academy where she sat her Kenya Certificate for Primary Education (KCPE) exams and proceeded to Moi Girl's Nangili. She then joined Masinde Muliro University where she graduated with a Bachelor of Education (Arts) degree in English and Literature. She holds a master's degree in Diplomacy and Foreign Policy from Moi University.

== Work and experience ==
Nyongesa taught at Mang'ang'a Secondary School BOG in western Kenya where she juggled between teaching and politics.

She later resigned from the teaching job and fully joined politics.

== Political career ==
After joining politics, she got deeply involved in the Orange Democratic Movement party campaigns in the 2013 general elections.

She sits in three house committees in the Senate: Implementation Committee, where she serves as the vice chairperson, Education Committee and ICT Committee.

She is a member of the Kenya Young Parliamentarians Association (KYPA) and sponsored the Youth Representation Bill.

Nyongesa was recently elected as the vice chairperson for Masinde Muliro University of Science and Technology Alumni Association (MMUSTAA).

== Charity work and mentorship ==
Nyongesa runs the Husika Elimika Badilika Foundation which seeks to empower the youth and women in the western region through entrepreneurial workshops, agribusiness start-ups and talent use. She also has a mentorship programme, the Somesha Toto initiative which targets schools in Kakamega County, with a view of ensuring that girls remain in school.

== Family ==
She is blessed with one kid in August.
