= Daisy Linda Ward =

American painter

- Born: 1883; New Jersey
- Died: 1937 (aged 53–54)

Daisy Linda Ward, née Travers (1883–1937) was a still life painter from New Jersey, best known for her collection of Dutch and Flemish still life paintings that was bequeathed by her husband in her name to the Ashmolean Museum.

Ward was born in New Jersey and married the British businessman Theodore William Holzapfel, who had taken his mother's maiden name of Ward to avoid anti-German sentiment during World War One. Theodore Ward had a professional interest in painting as a director of his family firm, Holzapfel (subsequently known as International Paint), manufacturers of marine, domestic and industrial paints and coatings based in Newcastle upon Tyne, Gateshead, and Felling.

The couple collected Dutch and Flemish 17th-century paintings. She became a still life painter and took her inspiration from works in her collection and elsewhere. She showed her work at the Royal Academy summer exhibition for the first time in 1925. Two of her paintings were included in the Ashmolean bequest that comprises 96 paintings.

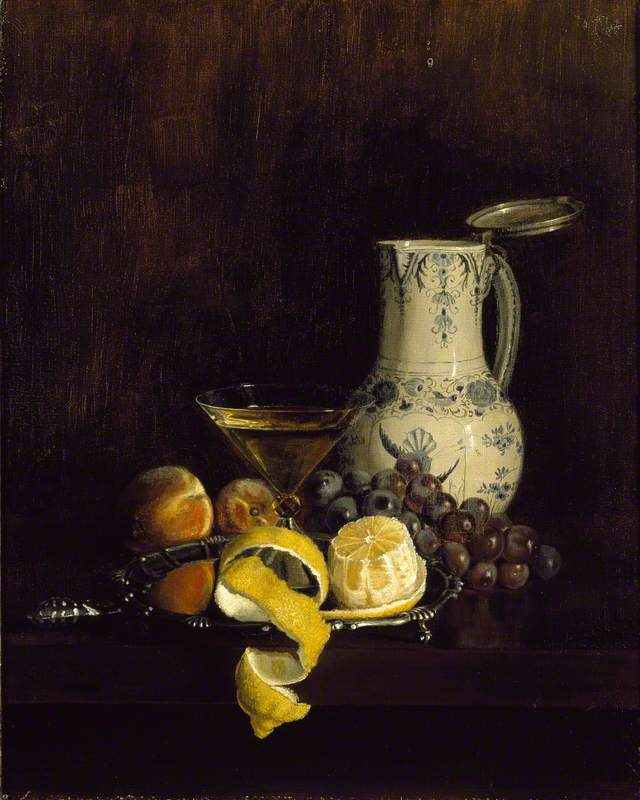
Partial copy by Daisy Linda Ward of a work by Willem Kalf

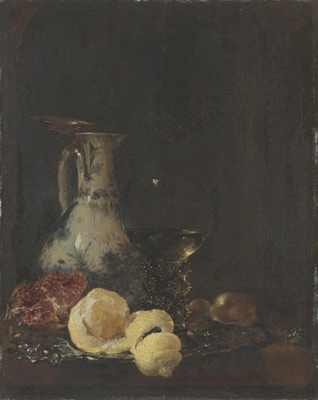
Original work, formerly in the collection of Josef Block, looted in WWII and recently restituted to his heir
