= Daisy Wood Hildreth =

American composer (1879/1880 – 1969)

Daisy Wood Hildreth (1879 or 1880 – July 30, 1969) was an American composer who wrote multiple compositions for instruments and vocals. Her performances have received praise and her song "The College Chimes" was chosen as the alumni song for the Iowa State College of Agriculture and Mechanic Arts.

== Personal life ==
Hildreth was born in Moulton, Iowa, and graduated from Iowa Wesleyan College after studying voice and piano. She completed graduate work at Highland Park College in Des Moines, Iowa, and New York City. She moved to Seattle, Washington. Her husband worked as a salesman at Frederick & Nelson.

== Career ==
Hildreth wrote songs for cello, violin, piano, string quartet, and vocals. The Times Colonist wrote in a 1928 review of her Victoria, British Columbia performance of four songs on the piano, sung by Florence Beeler, that Hildreth "is a pianist of high attainment, with rare musical understanding and poetic imagination." The songs were "Romance", "Dance Caprice", "Shadows", and "The Blind Girl" which received much applause. Violinist Margaret Lang performed Hildreth's "Poem" among songs by other musicians. She was a guest at the Iowa Federation of Music Clubs Biennial in 1931 and her songs were part of the program, sung by Helen Kacena Stark. In 1940, Hildreth and soprano Edna Hartman were invited to the Bellingham Woman's Music Club to lecture about her music and then perform. Songs from other composers were performed as well. During the same year, Hildreth opened a gala event for those associated with the General Federation of Women's Clubs with a talk dealing with poetry and music. Four of Hildreth's vocal compositions were sung and she played three of her songs on the piano.

Hildreth's music and Emma McHenry Glenn's lyrics for "The College Chimes" was chosen in 1921 by the Iowa State College of Agriculture and Mechanic Arts in Ames, Iowa, as their alumni song and has been sung at alumni reunions. A new alumni song was chosen in 1931 after another contest. The Gazette said in 1931 that "The Road to Kinsay", "The Blind Girl", and "Come Greet the Morn" were Hildreth's best known songs.
