= Daisy Smith =

- Born: 1891; Camden Town, London, England
- Died: 1983 (aged 91–92)

Daisy Smith (1891 – 1983) was a British artist who produced paintings in the 20th century.

== Biography ==
Daisy Smith was born in Camden Town as the daughter of a shopkeeper and grocer. As an artist, she was an exhibitor at the Royal Academy of Arts. She specialised in watercolours.
