= Citizen News =

Hong Kong independent news website

- Website type: News
- Available in: Traditional Chinese
- Dissolved: 4 January 2022; 4 years ago
- Headquarters: Hong Kong
- Owner: Civic Journalists Limited
- Website: www.hkcnews.com
- Commercial: No
- Registration: None
- Launched: 1 January 2017; 9 years ago
- Current status: Defunct

Citizen News or CitizenNews (Chinese: 眾新聞) was an online news website based in Hong Kong. The platform was launched on 1 January 2017 and shut down on 4 January 2022 amid a government crackdown on news media.

== Establishment and growth ==
Citizen News was established in 2017 following a successful crowdfunding campaign.

Citizen News was founded by 10 veteran journalists, including Ming Pao former editor-in-chief Kevin Lau and former HKJA chairperson Daisy Li. They expressed concern on the worsening freedom of press in Hong Kong at that time, and hoped to start a new platform to secure jornalistic professionalism. Citizen News relied on public donations to sustain operation and growth.

Citizen News focused on in-depth, less-biased, local news reporting, especially in legal and political issues, and was focused on filling gaps not covered by mainstream media. The outlet expanded in 2021, recruiting journalists from Chinese News Group of Cable Television on 18 January 2021 after their resignation in protest to staff cuts, and from RTHK, after many of its staff left the public broadcaster over what was seen as increasingly pro-government and censored political coverage.

== Closure ==
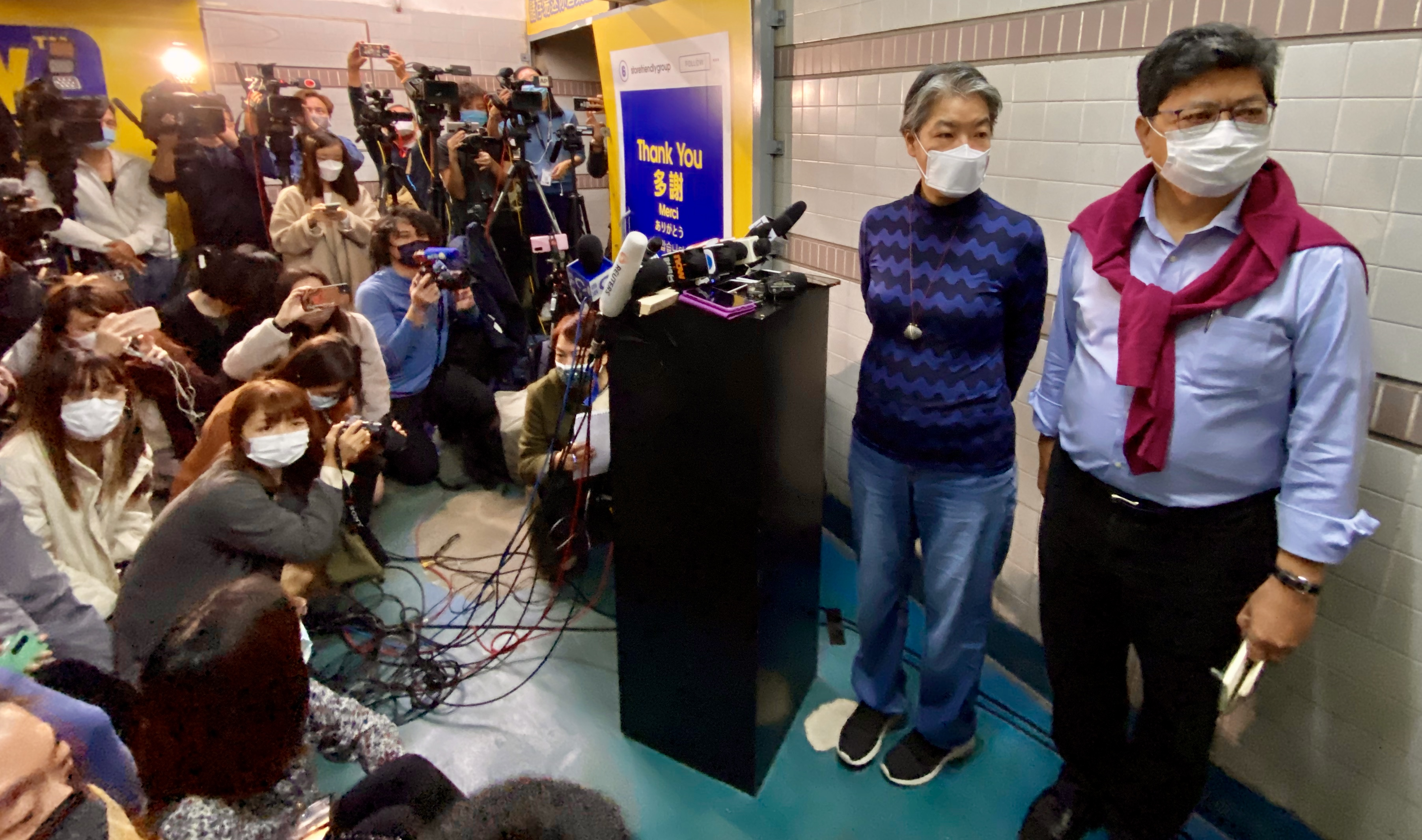
A press conference was held by Citizen News on 3 January 2022, announcing the outlet was closing the next day.

The outlet shut down on 4 January 2022, citing unclear “legal boundaries,” after the passing of the controversial national security law. The decision was made to cease operations to ensure the safety of its staffers. The surprise announcement on 2 January came just days after another opposition-leaning online news platform Stand News was raided and shut down, and several months after Apple Daily was similarly forced to close.

At the time of its closure, Citizen News employed a team of around 40 who worked from a newsroom in Cheung Sha Wan.

The Hong Kong Journalists Association stated that it was saddened by the closure. On the other hand, Beijing mouthpiece Wen Wei Po referred to the closures of Citizen News, Stand News, and Apple Daily as "self-inflicted". Hong Kong chief executive Carrie Lam stated that Citizen News had decided to close on its own, and therefore the incident was not an issue of diminishing freedom of the press.

== Awards ==
- Human Rights Press Awards 2018
  - Multimedia category – "Legal Records of Civil Disobedience" by Ng Yuen Ying (winner)
  - Text & Print – Commentary category – "Joint checkpoints: How they are done under British and French law" by Alvin Lum (merit award)
  - Tertiary – Text category – ""28th Anniversary series for the June 4 Tiananmen Square massacre" by Chong Hiu Tung (merit award)
- Human Rights Press Awards 2019
  - Commentary Writing category – "Three Secretaries for Justice Sought External Advice on Ten Cases Unrelated to Staff" by Ng Yuen Ying (winner)
  - Breaking News Writing category – "Edward Leung and 6 Others Charged for Inciting Riots in Mong Kok's Conflicts" by Tai Ching Hei (merit award)
  - Investigative Feature Writing category – "Save our Kids": Examining Child Abuse Issues by Yip Kit Ming (merit award)
- Human Rights Press Awards 2020
  - Explanatory Feature Writing category – "3 Barristers Cite European Cases: STS (Special Tactical Squad) Uniforms Not Showing Police Numbers Unconstitutional" by Ng Yuen Ying (merit award)
  - Multimedia category – Interactive Page on 721 Yuen Long Terrorist Attack by Cheung Hoi Kit, Egon Sung and Cherry Wong (merit award)
