= Daisy Li =

Hong Kong journalist

Daisy Li Yuet-Wah (Chinese: 李月華; pinyin: Lǐ Yuèhuá; Cantonese Yale: Lei^{5} Yut^{6}-wa ^{4}) is a Hong Kong journalist. She has previously worked for the independent paper Ming Pao, was the former chief executive of the online news division of Taiwan’s Apple Daily News, and was one of the founders and editor-in-chief of Citizen News until its closure in January 2022. She is also a leader of the Hong Kong Journalists' Association.

In 1994, she won an International Press Freedom Award from the Committee to Protect Journalists. An advocate for press freedom, she was critical in 1995 of what she viewed as increasing self-censorship among Hong Kong journalists in anticipation of Hong Kong's 1997 transfer of sovereignty to China.
