= Daisy Grace =

American suspected murder

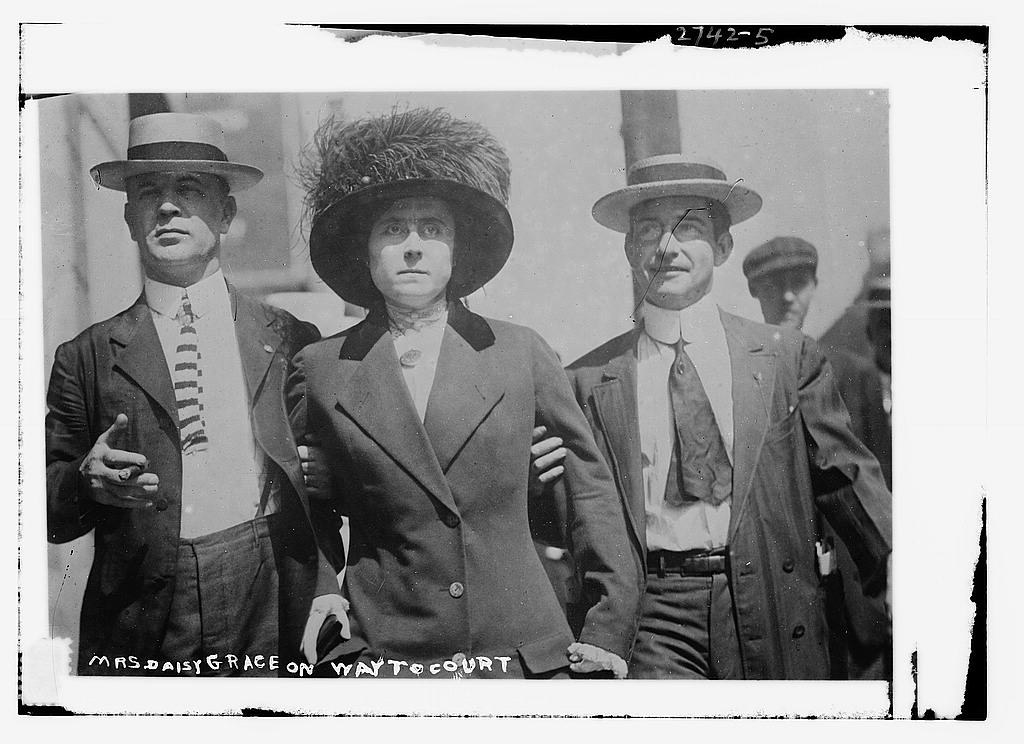
- Grace (middle) in 1912
- Born: Daisy Ulrich Opie unknown
- Spouse: Eugene H. Grace (died 1912)

Daisy Grace (born Daisy Ulrich Opie) was accused in 1912 of drugging her husband, Eugene H. Grace, and then shooting him for his insurance money in Atlanta, Georgia. She was tried and found not guilty.

== See also ==
- List of unsolved murders (1900–1979)
