= Daisy May Queen =

Argentine radio host, television presenter and writer

- Born: Marcela María Delorenzi; 15 September 1965 (age 60); Buenos Aires, Argentina
- Education: Instituto Superior de Enseñanza Radiofónica
- Occupations: Presenter, writer

Marcela María Delorenzi (born 15 September 1965), better known by her stage name Daisy May Queen, is an Argentine radio host, television presenter (from 1990 to 2012), and writer. After converting to Hinduism, she left her career in Argentina and currently resides in the city of Rishikesh, India.

== Biography ==
In late 1989, Daisy May Queen entered the Instituto Superior de Enseñanza Radiofónica (ISER) as an announcer, along with María Muñoz, Gabriela Radice, Karin Cohen, Elba Guerrero, Adrián Noriega, and Mariel Di Lenarda, among others. Her first job related to her profession was as a karaoke host. She currently holds a qualification as a national speaker.

She began her broadcasting career on Radio Continental, with Rolando Hanglin and Luisa Delfino. Later, she also worked with Adolfo Castelo when Hanglin decided to move his program to Radio El Mundo, in what was the first version of RH Positivo.

In 1992 she worked for Juan Alberto Badía in the summer season of Pinamar. It was there that Jorge Rodriguez, artistic director of FM Hit, called her to join the station, taking charge of the program Ranking Los 40 principales. She was one of the main voices of that station until 2005.

In 2006 she was the host of the special program Daisy May Queen, a series of exclusive intimate and acoustic interviews broadcast by Channel 9, featuring artists such as Axel, Chayanne, The Rasmus, Cristian Castro, Robbie Williams, Kudai, and Coti Sorokin.

May Queen was nominated on several occasions for Martín Fierro Awards as best host, best announcer, and best radio program. She was the host of two television programs: Reina de Corazones and La Casa del Pop, both for the cable network Quiero música en mi idioma. On that same channel, she was a juror of the reality show La Estrella Pop, together with Leo García. She also participated as a juror on Operación Triunfo seasons 1, 2, and 4 on Telefe.

In 2008 she began to host the nighttime radio program Curiosa Noche on Vale 97.5. In 2011 she released her book Pecados Espirituales, from Editorial Vergara, where she relates firsthand personal experiences, anecdotes, short stories, travel memories, and readings that she took to heart.

After several years of spiritual transformation, in 2012 she decided to give up her work in Argentina and settle in India. That December, she did not renew her contract with Vale 97.5 and departed for the city of Rishikesh, located at the foot of the Himalayas and known as the "world capital of yoga".

== Stage name ==
She took her stage name in honor of Brian May, guitarist of the successful British band Queen, of which she is a fan. In 1985, while attending the Rock in Rio music festival, she managed to get in touch with the members of the band and gave Brian May a charango. It was from that moment that she took his last name as her own, to which she would later add the Queen, so that there would be no doubt about the name.
