= Daisy Expósito-Ulla =

- Born: Cuba
- Education: New York Institute of Technology
- Known for: Advertising agency executive

Daisy Expósito-Ulla is Partner/President-CEO of d expósito & Partners, a Hispanic marketing and communications agency created in September 2006. She was the chairman and CEO of Young & Rubicam's Bravo Group until she resigned in 2004.

Expósito-Ulla, who was born in Cuba, has a bachelor's degree from the New York Institute of Technology.

== Recognition ==
In 2015, Expósito-Ulla was named one of the 25 most powerful women by People En Español.
