= Daisy Harcourt =

Daisy Harcourt was an English comedian who appeared on the vaudeville circuit during the early 20th century. An orphan, she advertised for a stage mother in March 1906. She wanted someone who could shield her from the difficulties of a theatrical career. Harcourt is significant for having an enduring stage career which she followed up as a radio presenter.

== Actress and singer ==
A 1906 billing at Hammerstein's Victoria Theatre included Harcourt, as did a January 1909 theatrical show at the American Theater in New York City. She played the role of Kar-Mi, a conjurer, in vaudeville entertainment which celebrated the fourteenth anniversary of the Victoria Theatre, in September 1914.

A versatile performer, she performed songs on WMSG 1350 AM, New York City, in 1929.
