= Daisy de Peinder =

Dutch softball player (born 1976)

Daisy de Peinder (born 26 December 1976 in Breda), is a Dutch softball player, who represents the Dutch national team in international competitions.

De Peinder played for Twins Sporting Club, Tallahassee CC, St. Louis CC, Columbia State University and since 2007 for Macerata. She is a shortstop and third baseman who bats and throws right-handed. She competes for the Dutch national team since 1997. In 2001 she was named as the best batter in the Dutch Softball Hoofdklasse. She is part of the Dutch team for the 2008 Summer Olympics in Beijing.
