= Daisy Calhoun =

American socialite

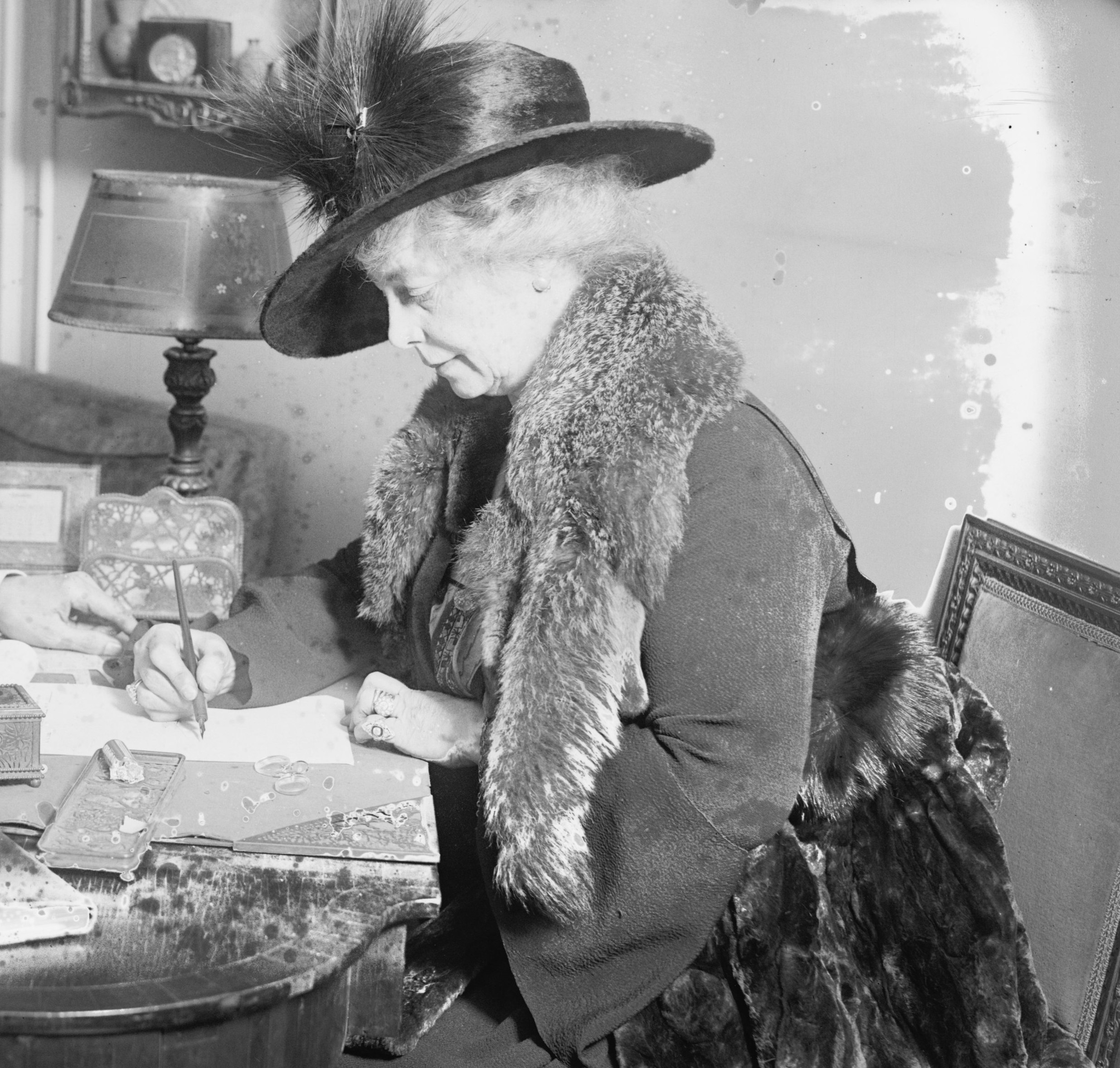
- Calhoun in 1923
- Born: 1863
- Died: 1949 (aged 85–86)
- Citizenship: American
- Occupations: socialite, hostess, social leader

Daisy Breaux Calhoun (1863–1949) was an American socialite, hostess, and social leader.

== Biography ==
=== Early life ===
Margaret Rose Anthony Julia Josephine Catherine Cornelia Donovan O'Donovan was born on March 12, 1863, in Philadelphia to Cornelius MacCarty Moore Donovan O'Donovan, who had served in the British Army, and Julia Josephine Marr. When Cornelius died the family moved to New Orleans where Julia married Gustave Breaux. Margaret became known as Daisy Breaux. She attended the Georgetown Visitation Convent in Washington.

=== Marriages ===
Daisy Breaux was married three times. Her first husband, Andrew Simonds Jr., was a banker in South Carolina, and she moved to Charleston, South Carolina, to live with him after the two were married in 1885. The couple lived in Villa Margherita, which was built in the early 1890s for them. An obituary reported that Daisy had designed the home. The home was sometimes called "The White House of the South" and three presidents—Theodore Roosevelt, Grover Cleveland, and William Howard Taft—visited it.

After Simonds died in 1905, she turned the house into a luxury hotel. Two years later she was married to Barker Gummere, also a banker. Daisy moved with a young year old daughter to live with him in New Jersey on an estate named Rosedale—which she had also designed. There she played host to prominent figures such as Woodrow Wilson. Barker died in 1914, and Daisy oversaw the conversion of the house into a girls' academy. She eventually moved to Washington, D.C. Her third husband, Clarence Crittenden Calhoun, was a wealthy lawyer from Kentucky. The couple were married in 1918. Daisy attended the 1920 Democratic National Convention, which inspired her to found a women's rights organization. Her husband funded the construction of Rossdhu Castle, a large home near Beach Drive in Washington, which Daisy Calhoun designed. It was very ornate, but the family was forced to move into the gatehouse upon the beginning of the Great Depression in 1929. She also founded the Women's National Foundation (which was dissolved after several years) and the Women's Universal Alliance (in February 1922), the later of which held a World Welfare Conference in 1923.

=== Mothers' Memorial ===
Daisy Calhoun spent years working to develop a "Mothers' Memorial" in Washington, D.C. When the Women's Universal Alliance had been founded, it promised an "acropolis to the womanhood of all lands, as a tribute to the great women of the past and to the motherhood of the world." Harry Hake was selected to create a design in early 1929. Calhoun had previously asked William Clark Noble, and in 1924 announced that his design for a vast monument was selected. The following year a campaign to raise $15 million was raised for a design by Joseph Geddes. Noble quit in a fury. He demanded large amounts of money and in 1931 was sued for extortion. In the case others testified that the memorial itself was a scam.

=== Later life and death ===
Her husband died in 1938. Calhoun eventually retired and moved back to Charleston. She died on March 22, 1949, at the age of 85.

She had published books that included Favorite Recipes of a Famous Hostess, Knight of Liberty, and The Autobiography of a Chameleon.
