= Daisy Richards Bisz =

American lawyer

Daisy Richards Bisz was born Daisy Gammage in 1909 in Missouri and lived in Coral Gables, Florida. She died of heart failure May 8, 2007 in Miami, Florida. Bisz was a prominent Florida attorney. A survivor of infantile polio (which briefly paralyzed her from the neck down), she was one of three sisters, an avid fisher, and played church piano music when she wasn't busy with her job. Bisz went on to become one of the Florida's first female lawyers.

== Professional career ==
Bisz graduated high school in 1927 and was sponsored by the Citizens and Southern Bank of Atlanta loan to attend a business college. She was 18 when she left the business office and got a job at a law office. However, it wasn't until her uncle encouraged her to become a lawyer that she pursued it. Though Bisz had no formal college degree, she studied law at the South Florida College of Law but dropped out after learning four of the thirty two subjects on the bar exam so that she could teach herself the rest in time. Bisz passed the bar is exam in 1937 and was admitted to a Florida Bar the same year. She was so dedicated to her job that when her arm was seriously injured in 1954, she was back to work as soon as she was released from her three-month hospitalization. The very same year, she traveled to Washington, D.C. to be admitted to the Supreme Court of the United States and the Court of Military Appeals (the country's two highest courts).

Bisz was one of the first woman admitted to the Dade County Bar Association in 1937. She sat on its courts committee and was unanimously voted in to take Director George Smathers position in July 1942 after previously serving three terms as secretary. Bisz was the first woman to hold such a prestigious position with the Dade County Bar.

Furthermore, Bisz was giving at least one day a week to draw up wills for members of the armed services (or legal matters for anyone dependent on them) for free. Additionally, Bisz was the secretary for Sunset Lanes Groves Inc. and director of Boulevard Grocery Corporation.

Bisz specialized in probate law: proving that a will is valid and administering estate according to the will of the deceased person. Most notably, Bisz represented clients whose property had been seized in Fidel Castro's 1959 Cuban revolution. A few of whom she represented included Fernando Cabeza, Winnifred Clover Frodin, Geraldine F. Walsh, Margy F Thiel, and Joseph E. Fitzgerald. In the cases against the Cuban government, previously mentioned, Bisz was able to get each of the people she represented a cash refund for their lost land. Additionally, she won them a settlement of 6% interest from the time the land was lost until the court date. Bisz also represented Ted Williams, the Boston Red Sox baseball legend.
