= Daisy Voog =

Estonian-German mountain climber

Daisy Voog (28 January 1932 – 2020), later known as Daisy Leidig, was an Estonian-German mountain climber. She is best known as the first woman to ascend the north face of the Eiger in 1964.

== Biography ==
Voog was born 1932 in Tallinn, Estonia, and fled to Germany in 1944, settling in Munich in 1952. In her youth she was an athlete, competing in 800 metres running events and training to join the Olympic cross-country skiing team. She took up climbing while living in Munich and eventually won a gold medal in a Bavarian rock climbing competition. She aspired to become a physical education teacher but found the salary insufficient, so she became a secretary instead, working at Junkers, an aircraft manufacturer, from 1956 until August 1964. She served as a secretary for the company's owner, Erhard Junkers, with whom she was reported to have had a romantic relationship.

She began climbing in 1959, primarily in the Dolomites range of the Alps. Her early climbs included Wildspitze (1959), Königspitze (1961) and Cinque Torri (1963). She achieved national fame on 4 September 1964, when she became the first woman to ascend the Eiger's north face, which she climbed via the Heckmair route with Werner Bittner. The Eiger was one of numerous alpine ascents she made in 1964, others included Predigstuhl, Gurrwand, Torre Venezia, Torre Trieste, Kleinste Zinne and Kleine Zinne, Monte Civetta, Marmolada, and Piz Lasties.

Shortly after her ascent of the Eiger, charges were brought against Voog by her former employer, Erhard Junkers, who alleged that she had stolen over 10,000 Deutsche Mark and a car from his company. In June 1965, she was convicted of embezzlement, fraud, and breach of trust by a court in Munich, and was sentenced to nine months of probation. Her conviction caused extensive controversy in the media; headlines included "Skandal um die 'Eiger-Königin'" ("Scandal involving the 'Eiger Queen'") and "Nordwand-Bezwingerin Daisy Voog wegen Unterschlagung angezeigt!" ("North wall conqueror Daisy Voog reported for embezzlement!").

In 1966, Voog continued climbing with an ascent of Schüsselkarspitze via the southeast face. Little is known of her later career and her ascent of the Eiger has been reported as her only major alpine feat.

Voog died in 2020.
