= Daisy Voisin =

Trinidadian Parang singer (1924–1991)

- Daisy Voisin

Background information
- Born: 23 September 1924
- Origin: Erin, Trinidad and Tobago
- Died: 7 August 1991 (aged 66)
- Genre: Parang
- Occupations: Musician, song-writer
- Instruments: Vocals, cuatro
- Years active: 1971–1991

Daisy Voisin (23 September 1924 – 7 August 1991) was a Trinidadian Parang singer and composer.

== Life and career ==
Voisin was born and grew up in Carapal Erin, Trinidad. She began her singing career in the Village Council and other local groups. A deeply religious person, she received the message to spread the gospel of Parang in a church in Siparia in 1973. Not long after she was launched into the spotlight at a "Best Village" competition in 1971. She did her best to live up to that calling.

Hailed as the "Queen of Parang" for her vocal prowess and popularity of the band she led, the La Divina Pastora Serenaders, Daisy Voisin left an indelible mark on the local Parang scene in Trinidad and Tobago. Her voice was described as both sweet and powerful, and armed with a bouquet of flowers in hand during performances, she ruled Parang music for many years. Her signature songs "Hurray Hurrah" and "Alegría, Alegría" became Christmas classics, sung with her characteristic musical trill "Aiyee, Aiyee".

Her live performances were described as "explosive, vivacious and tempestuous". Voisin and her group became cultural ambassadors for Trinidad and Tobago, taking the music to places in the Caribbean, Isla de Margarita, Venezuela, and North America.

In the latter days of her life, Voisin's performances were few, hampered by ill-health, but the quality of her voice was still evident.
