= Daisy Maude Orleman Robinson =

American medical doctor

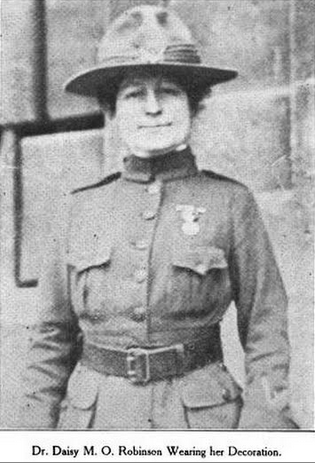
Daisy Maude Orleman Robinson, wearing her uniform and one of her French medals, from a 1918 publication.

Daisy Maude Orleman Robinson (November 6, 1869 – March 12, 1942) was an American medical doctor, a dermatologist, decorated for her work in France during World War I.

== Early life and education ==
Daisy Maude Orlemann was born in Fort Riley, Kansas, the daughter of Louis Henry Orlemann and Katharina Orlemann. Her father was a Civil War veteran and military mapmaker. The family changed the spelling of its surname while Daisy was young.

Daisy Orleman attended high school in Washington, D. C. She earned her medical degree and a master's degree by 1896, both at Columbia College (later renamed to George Washington University), with other graduate studies in Zurich and Paris.

== Career ==
Daisy Orleman taught school in Florida briefly as a young woman, before returning to Washington D. C. for further education. She worked as a medical examiner for the United States Pension Bureau from 1890 to 1893, then as resident physician, lecturer, and debate coach at Peekskill Military Academy from 1899 to 1903. She taught at the New York Polyclinic Medical school and worked for the New York State Department of Health as a “social hygienist”. She is considered the first American woman dermatologist. Her research involved the effects of X-rays on skin, and treatments for herpes, cancer, leprosy, and syphilis.

During World War I she joined the French Army's medical corps, and worked with the United States Army Medical Corps and the American Red Cross after they arrived. She was decorated for her services by the French government, with the Medaille de la Reconnaissance francaise and another medal for her management of epidemics.

After the war, Robinson was one of the founders of the International Medical Women's Association in 1919. She worked in public health, especially focused on prevention of sexually transmitted disease and the development of sex education programs for young women. She spoke on the subject to the national convention of women's clubs in 1922, and attended several international meetings in Europe. She served as an officer of the United States Public Health Service She retired in 1938.

== Personal life and legacy ==
Daisy Maude Orleman married Andrew Rose Robinson, a fellow dermatologist, in 1904. Andrew Robinson died in 1924. Daisy M. O. Robinson died in 1942, aged 72 years, in Jacksonville, Florida. Today, there is a Daisy Orleman Robinson Society for planned giving donors to the Women's Dermatological Society.

Daisy's younger sister Violette Orleman-Bergere also served as a physician for the French Army during World War I.
