= Daisy Gonzales =

U.S. academic administrator

Chancellor of California Community Colleges
- Interim
- Assumed office August 2022
- Preceded by: Eloy Ortiz Oakley

Personal details
- Born: Los Angeles, California, U.S.
- Education: Los Angeles Valley College; Mills College at Northeastern University; University of California, Santa Barbara

Daisy Angelica Gonzales is an American academic administrator serving as the interim chancellor of California Community Colleges since August 2022. She was the deputy chancellor from 2018 to 2022.

== Life ==
Gonzales was born in Los Angeles to an immigrant family. From the age of two, she was raised primarily in foster care. She was reunified with her parents on three occasions, ultimately leaving them for the last time at the age of 13. By 17, she was emancipated. Gonzales was taken in by her high school chemistry teacher, Patricia Barker, who encouraged her academic pursuits. She attended Los Angeles Valley College. She graduated from Mills College at Northeastern University with a bachelor's degree in public policy. Gonzales completed a master's degree and Ph.D. at University of California, Santa Barbara. Her 2016 dissertation was titled, Elected Bodies: The Maintenance of Occupational Sex Segregation in Elected Office. Sociologist Beth Schneider was her doctoral advisor.

Gonzales was a third-grade teacher in a dual-immersion program. She worked as a budget consultant for the budget committee of the California State Assembly. She also served as a principal consultant to its appropriations committee. She was the associate director of the Policy Analysis for California Education.

From 2018 to 2022, Gonzales served as the deputy chancellor of the California Community Colleges (CCC). She was the acting chancellor from July to November 2021 while Eloy Ortiz Oakley took a sabbatical. In August 2022, she succeeded Oakley as the interim chancellor. She is the first Latina and the second woman after Diane Woodruff to serve in CCC chancellor position. Sonya Christian was hired to succeed Gonzales in June 2023.
