= Daisy Irani =

Daisy Irani may refer to:

- Daisy Irani (actress) (born 1950), Indian actress
- Daisy Irani (television personality), Indian-born Singaporean actress and TV personality
