= Daisy Sylvan =

Italian actress, producer, and studio owner

Daisy Sylvan (July 12, 1874 – Unknown), born Elena Mazzantini, was an Italian film studio owner, producer, director, and actress in the silent era. She was the founder of Daisy Film, which produced ...Bolscevismo?? (...Bolshevism, 1922) and Sovrana (Sovereign, 1923), both considered lost films.

== Early life and career ==
Sylvan was born Elena Mazzantini in Rome on July 12, 1874. Her parentage is unknown, although it is unlikely that she was born to aristocrats, as was once thought.

Little is known about Sylvan's early life and career. It is likely that she studied with well-known actor and acting coach Luigi Rasi in Florence. In 1918, Sylvan announced that she had written two film scripts, presumably for ...Bolscevismo?? and Sovrana. In 1919, Sylvan legally established her own production company, Daisy Film, located on Via Strozzi in Florence. Both films were completed in 1920, though seemingly not distributed until 1922 and 1923, respectively. Sylvan was plagued by accusations of union violations throughout her tenure as studio head. Records suggest that Sylvan may have unlawfully terminated workers at Daisy Film, though it is likely that these infractions were amplified in the press by Sylvan's professional rivals.

== ...Bolscevismo?? ==
While this film in not extant, promotional materials show that ...Bolscevismo?? was a morality play set during the Russian Revolution. ...Bolscevismo?? was based loosely on the novel The Flame in the Steppe by Danilo Korsakoff. The film tells the story of sisters Elena and Enelia Morgani, both played by Sylvan. Elena is represented as hardworking and good while Enelia is shown to be disloyal and morally corrupt. Indeed, one pamphlet for the film suggests that Enelia has stolen Elena's husband. Elena, Sylvan's namesake and surrogate in the film, manages workers at a factory in a town called Selenio. A vicious Bolshevik journalist named Zobisant sets out to destroy Elena's personal life and career. Ultimately, Elena defeats Zobisant, leaving him begging for her forgiveness at the end of the film.

This film was shot largely on location in Florence, with some scenes filmed at Daisy Film's small studio.

Sylvan began working on ...Bolscevismo around 1918 and completed filming by 1920, according to news sources. Though passed by censors and distributed in 1922, the film was never shown theatrically.

== Sovrana ==
Like ...Bolscevismo??, Sovrana is considered a lost film. Existing promotional materials suggest that the film was based on a comedic play by Dario Nicodemi. The plot concerns a young woman, Giana, who is rescued from the underworld by actor Luigi Rasi (Daisy Sylvan's real life mentor). It seems that the film's title, Sovrana (Sovereign), refers to the protagonist's rejection of romantic overtures, choosing instead to remain "sovereign of her heart."

== Personal life ==
Sylvan married Francesco Rosso in Rome in 1897. The couple officially separated in 1902, though remained legally married until Rosso's death in 1920. Sylvan and Rosso had at least one child (a son) together.
