= Icheon Ceramic Festival =

South Korean yearly festival

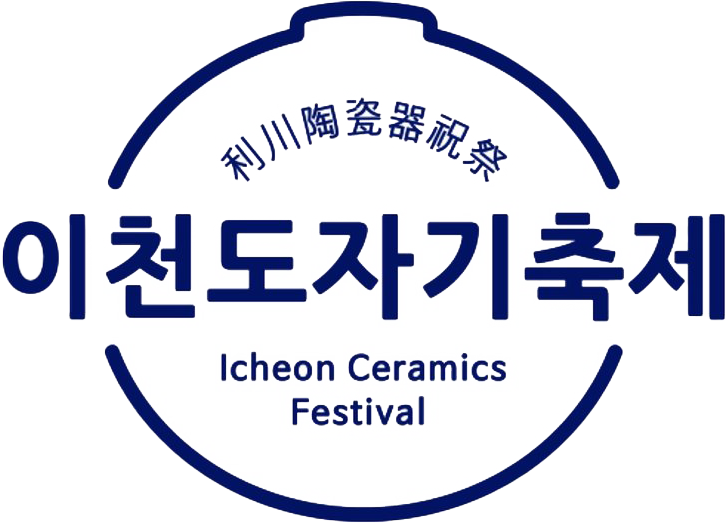
Icheon Ceramic Festival logo

Icheon Ceramic Festival is a South Korean festival opened every year in Gyeonggi-do province.

== About ==
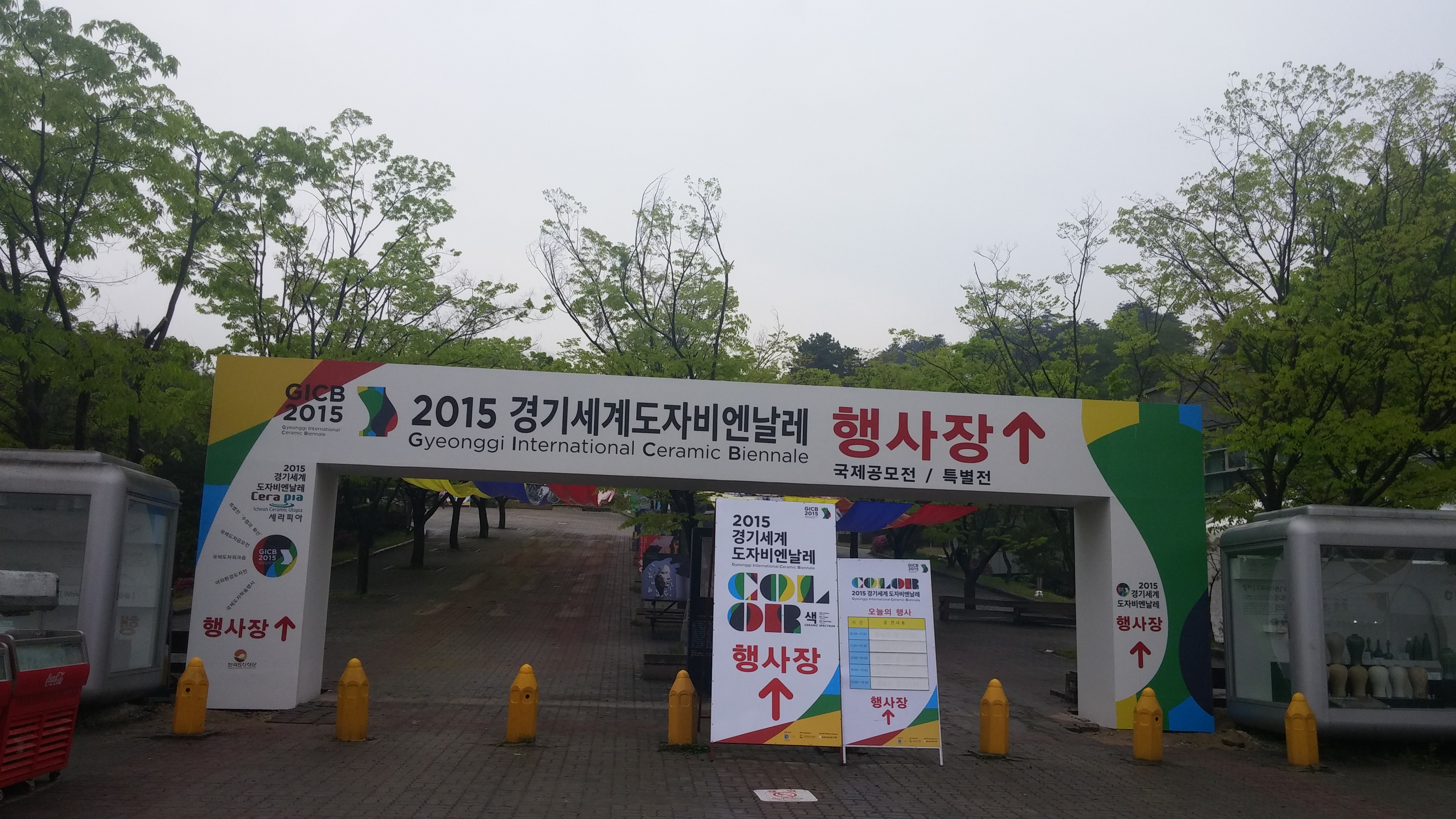
Icheon Ceramic Festival main gate

Icheon, Gyeonggi-do, has been a valuable city for ceramic arts since the Bronze Age. In 2010, the city was designated as "City of Crafts and Folk Art" on the UNESCO Creative Cities Network. A variety of South Korea's finest ceramics such as Cheongja (celadon porcelain), Baekja (white porcelain) and Buncheong (grayish-blue powdered celadon) are exhibited in this festival. This festival is Korea's largest ceramic culture festival and is a free exhibition that takes place every year during April and May.

== History ==
The first Icheon Ceramic Festival was held at the event area of Seolbong Hotel in the form of small scale ceramic market. During the time, revenue of the festival was only 20 million won. As a part of the Seolbong Cultural Festival, Icheon Ceramic Festival was organized by Icheon Cultural Center until the 8th festival in 1994. It was a small-scaled local festival due to insufficient budget and low participation of ceramic artists.

== Ceramic product hall ==
- Ceramic products
- Ceramic road booth
- Docent operated

== Exhibitions ==
- Meeting of tradition and modernization
- Symposium
- Ceramic road workshop
- Ceramic making demonstration and large ceramic performance
- Ceramic exhibition
- 2006 "From Earth to Light" Master Kim Se-yong (ceramist) held at Icheon World Ceramic Center

== Events and performance ==
- Icheon youth art festival
- B-boy graffiti contest
- Face painting
- Nail art
- Invitation performance by military music group
- Street performances
- Hands-on programs

== Gallery ==
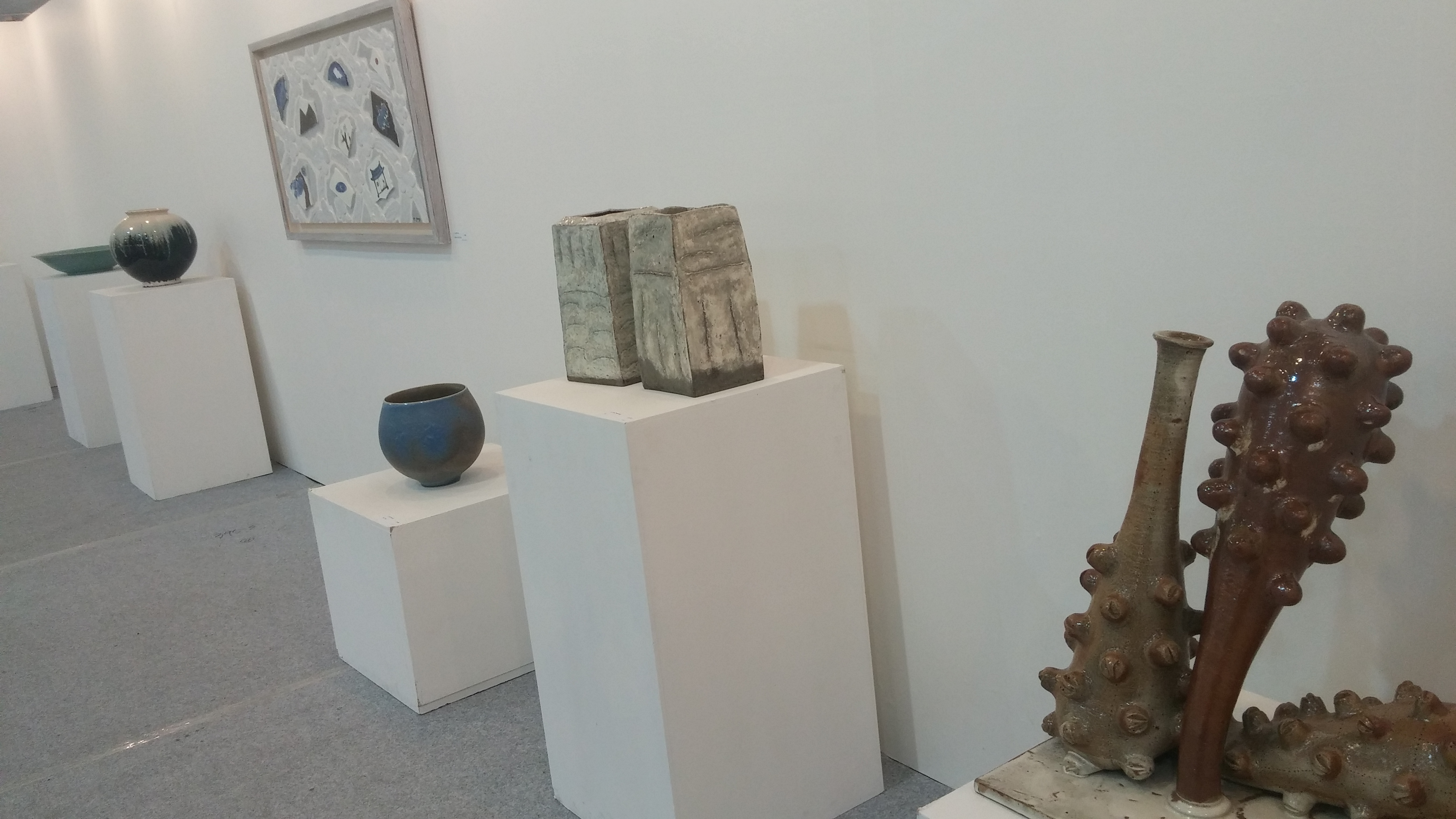
Icheon Ceramic's exhibition

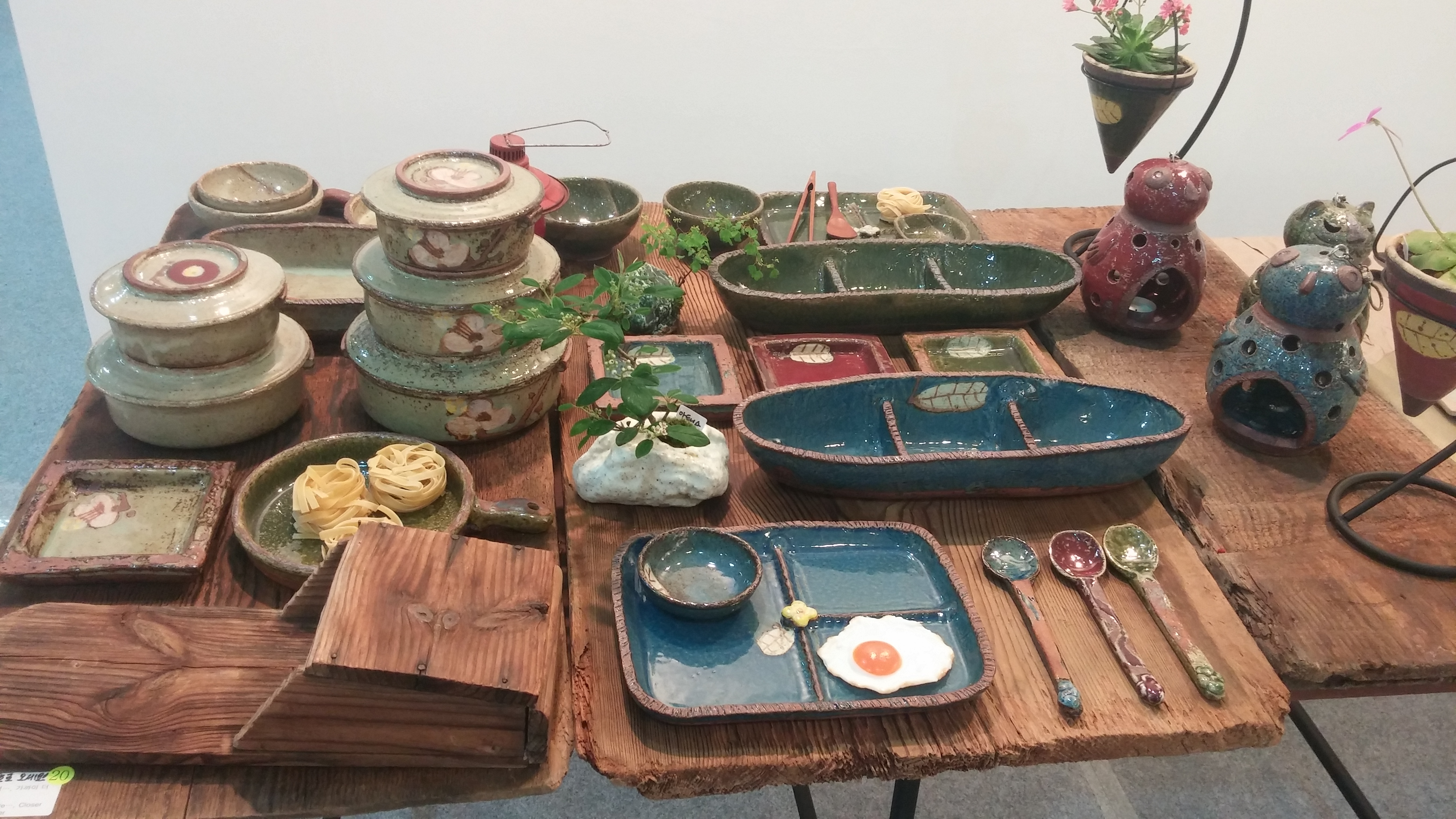
Ceramic plates and utensils

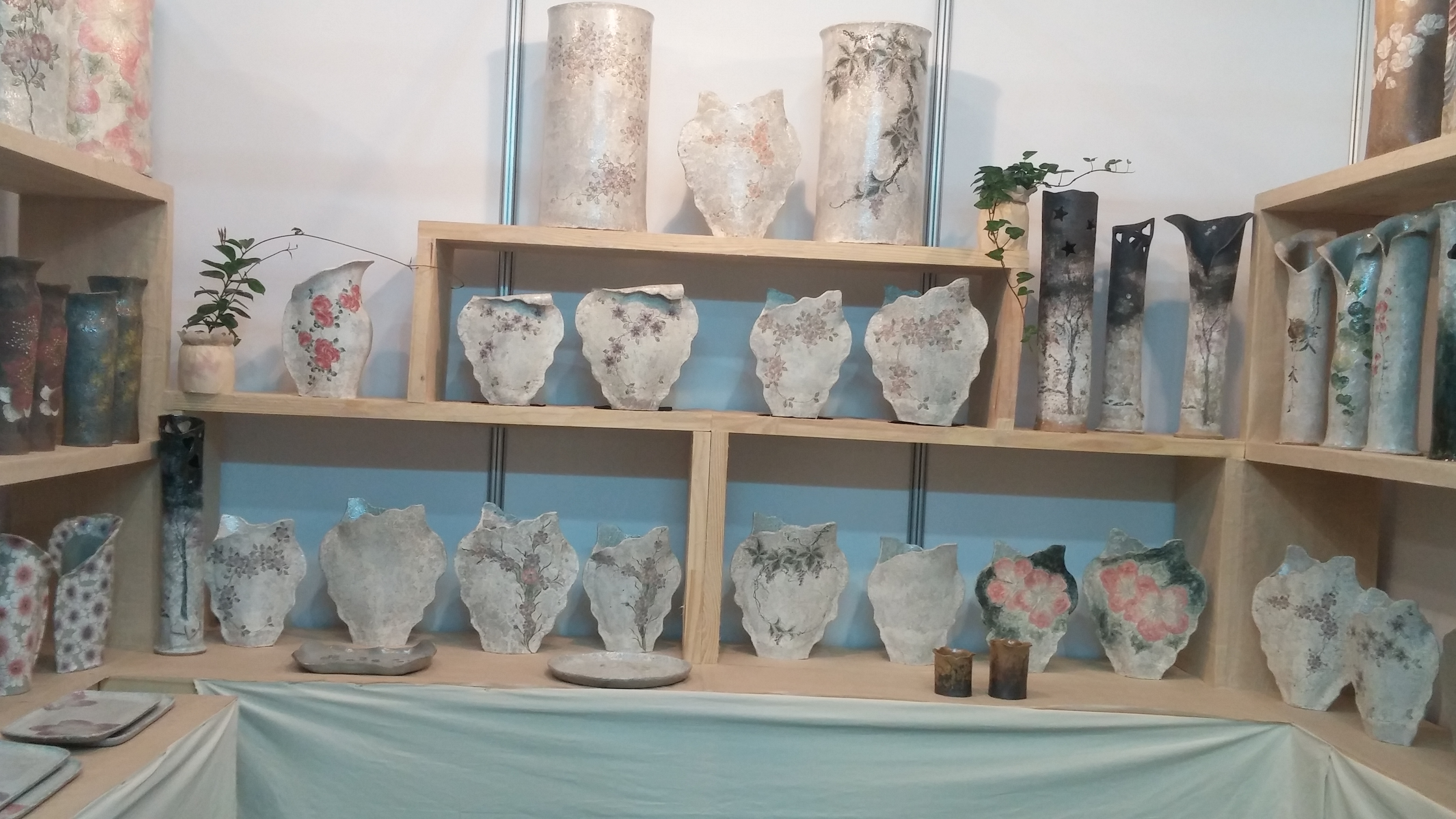

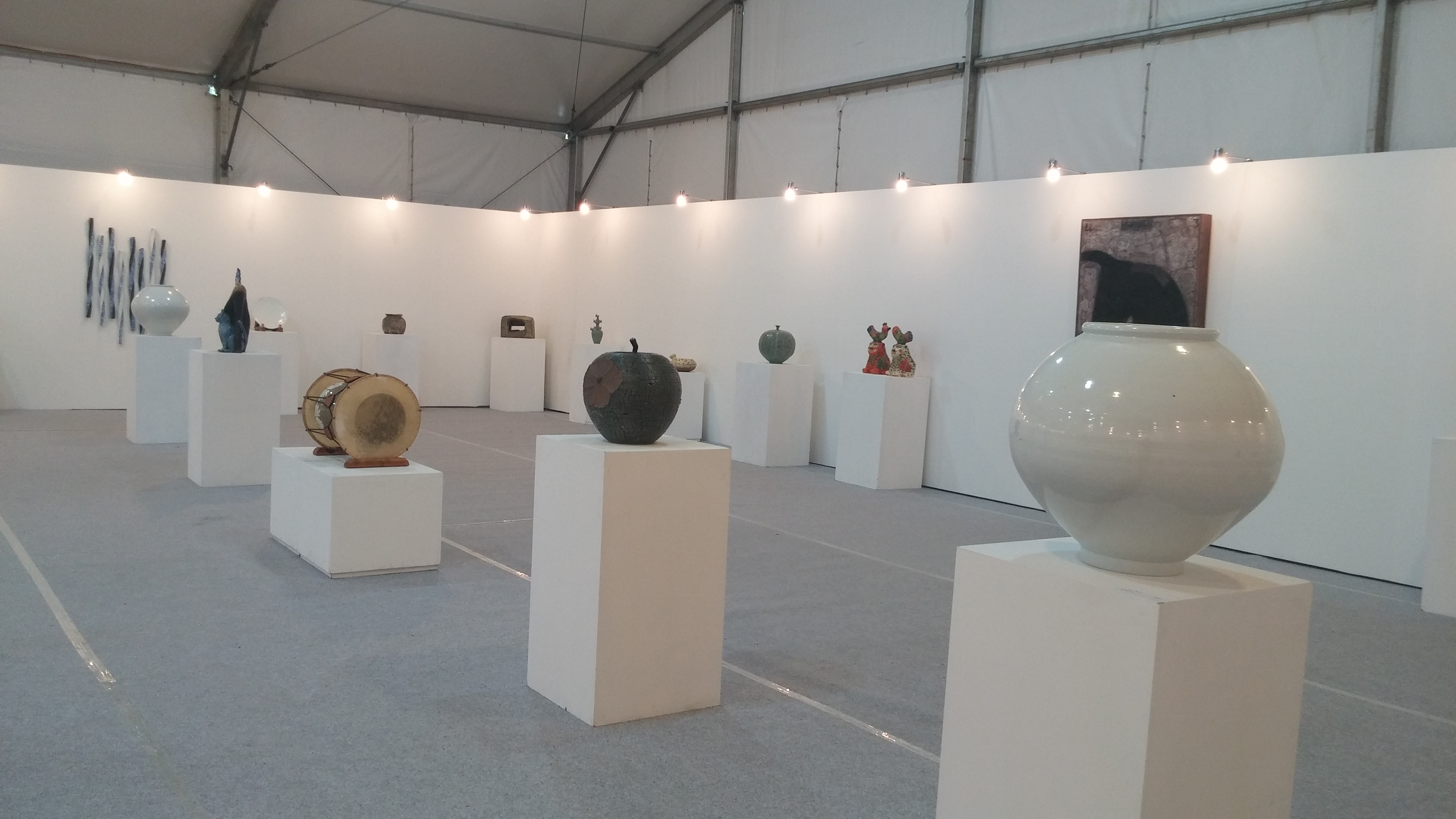
Ceramics

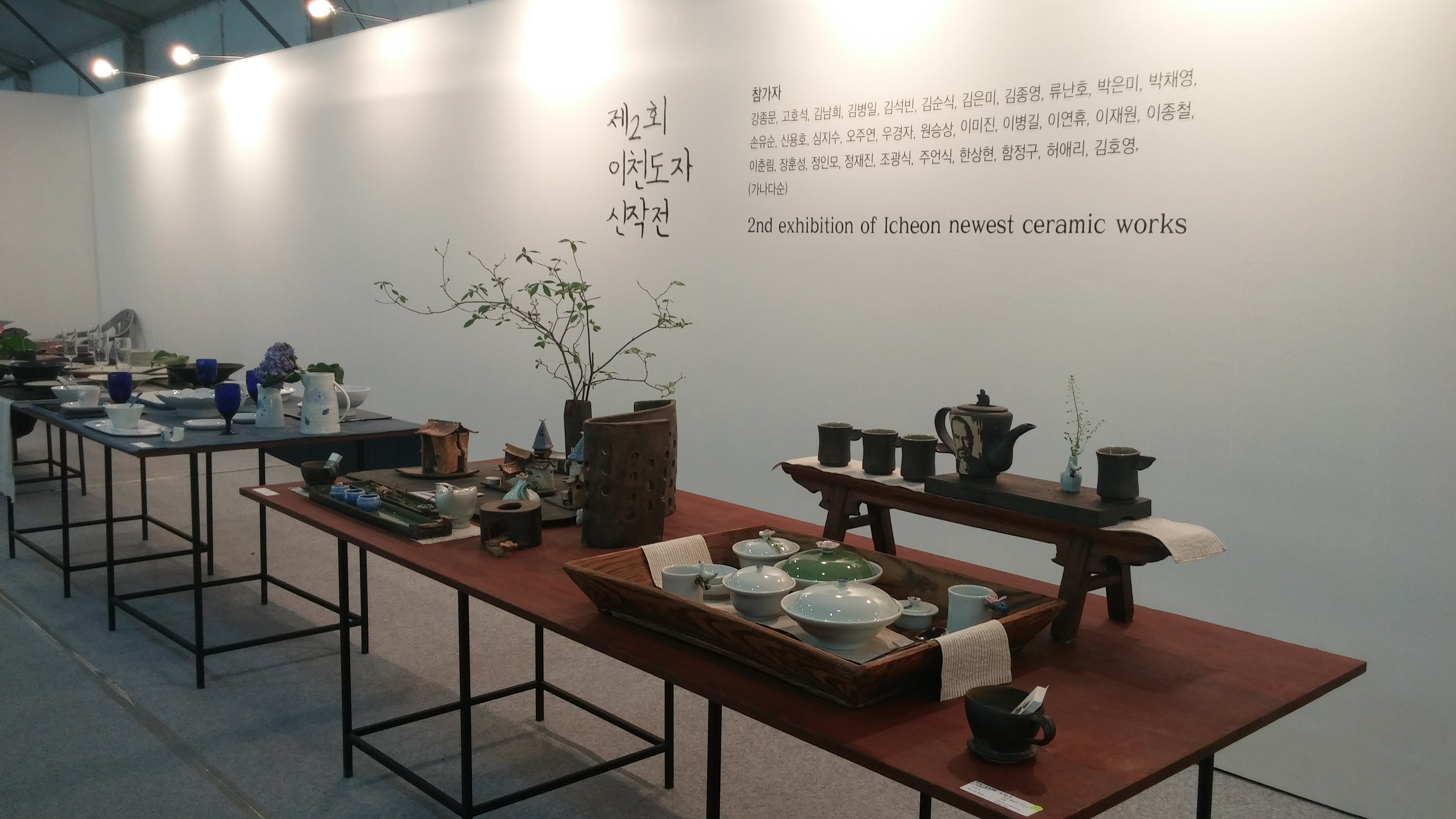
Ceramics

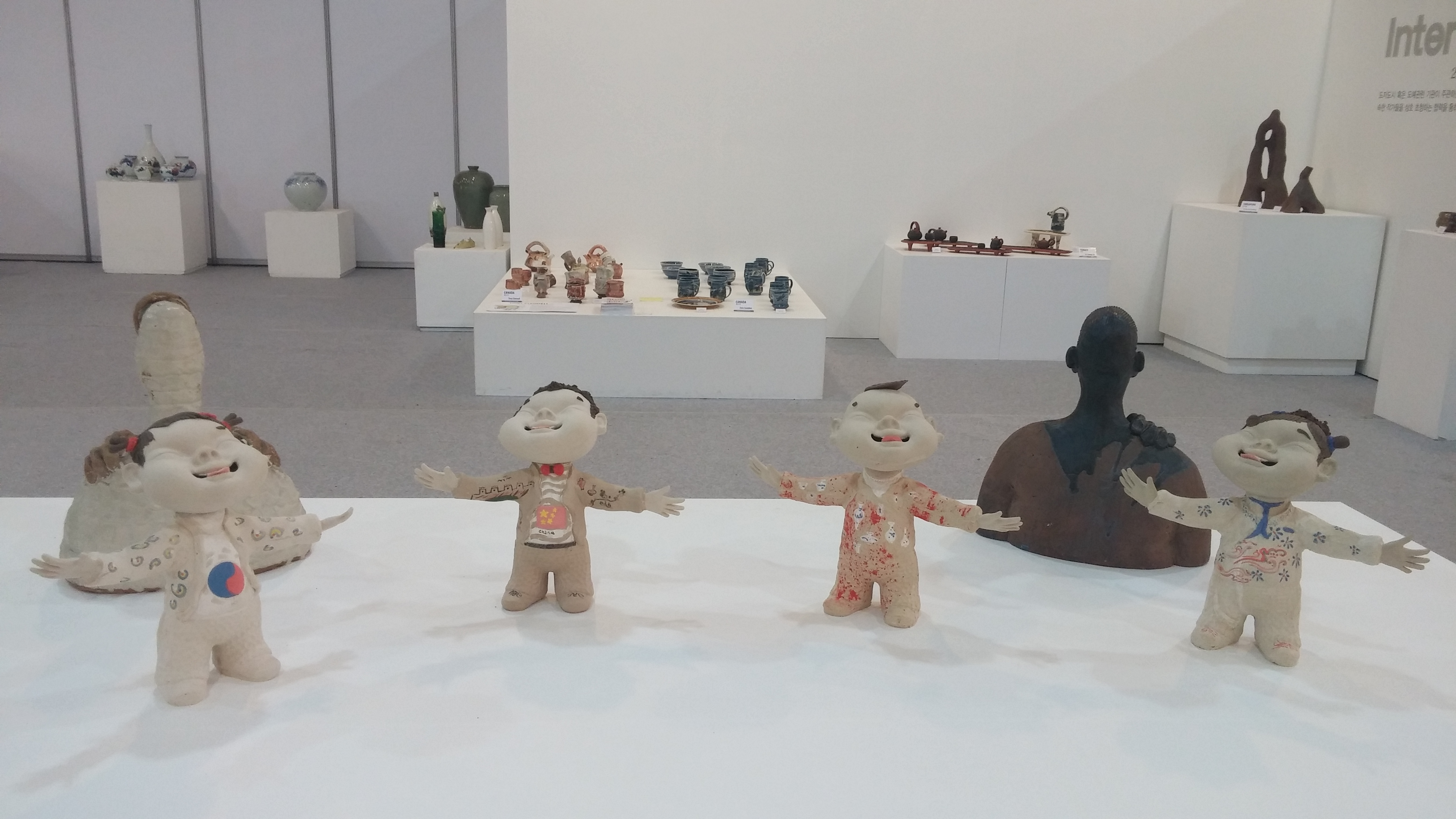
Ceramic dolls

== Location ==
The festival takes place at Seolbong Park which can be reached by taking an intercity bus from Dong Seoul Bus Terminal or Seoul Express Bus Terminal to Icheon Bus Terminal, which is a 10-minute drive to the destination.
