= Daisy Lumini =

Italian composer, singer, and stage actress (1936 – 1993)

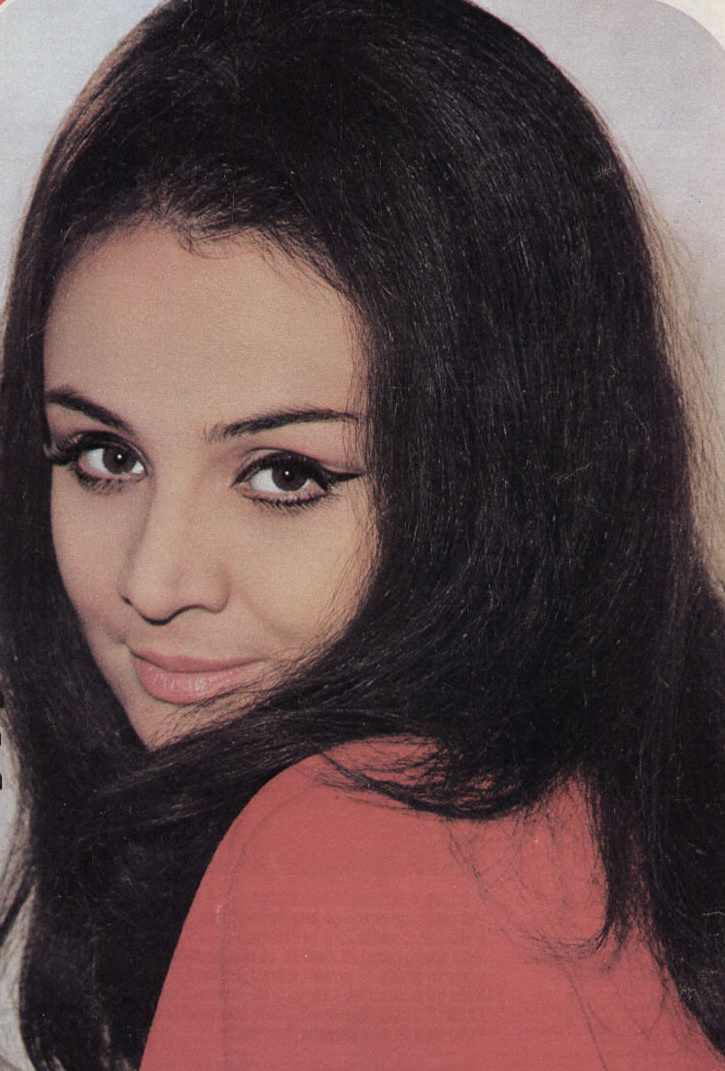
Daisy Lumini, 1972.

Desy Lumini, best known as Daisy Lumini (18 August 1936 – 18 August 1993), was an Italian composer, singer and stage actress.

Born in Florence, at young age Lumini graduated in piano and composition, and began her career as a composer of soundtracks and songs; she later came to fame by participating in numerous Italian television shows.

Lumini, who spoke five languages fluently, during her career also toured in the United States (where she participated at The Perry Como Show and sang at Carnegie Hall), France and Germany. In the sixties, after a brief period in the cabaret, she devoted herself to the research and the diffusion of Tuscan folk music, recording many albums with the popular repertoire and put it on shows with the stage company of Beppe Chierici. After working in contemporary musical theater, in the eighties Lumini started a successful collaboration with Salvatore Sciarrino, winning the Prix Italia Award in 1985. In 1993, the day of her birthday, she died by suicide along with her husband Tino Schirinzi, struck by an incurable disease, by jumping from the viaduct under construction on the Bilancino dam near Barberino di Mugello.
