= Daisy C. Allen =

Utah state legislator and suffragist

Daisy Claire White Allen (4 December 1881 - 17 November 1942) was a state legislator in Utah. She was a suffragist. She served in the Utah House of Representatives in 1917. She was a Democrat.

She lived in Garfield, Utah. She was documented as "Dem-Prog" for her party affiliation(s).
