= Daisy Makeig-Jones =

British artist

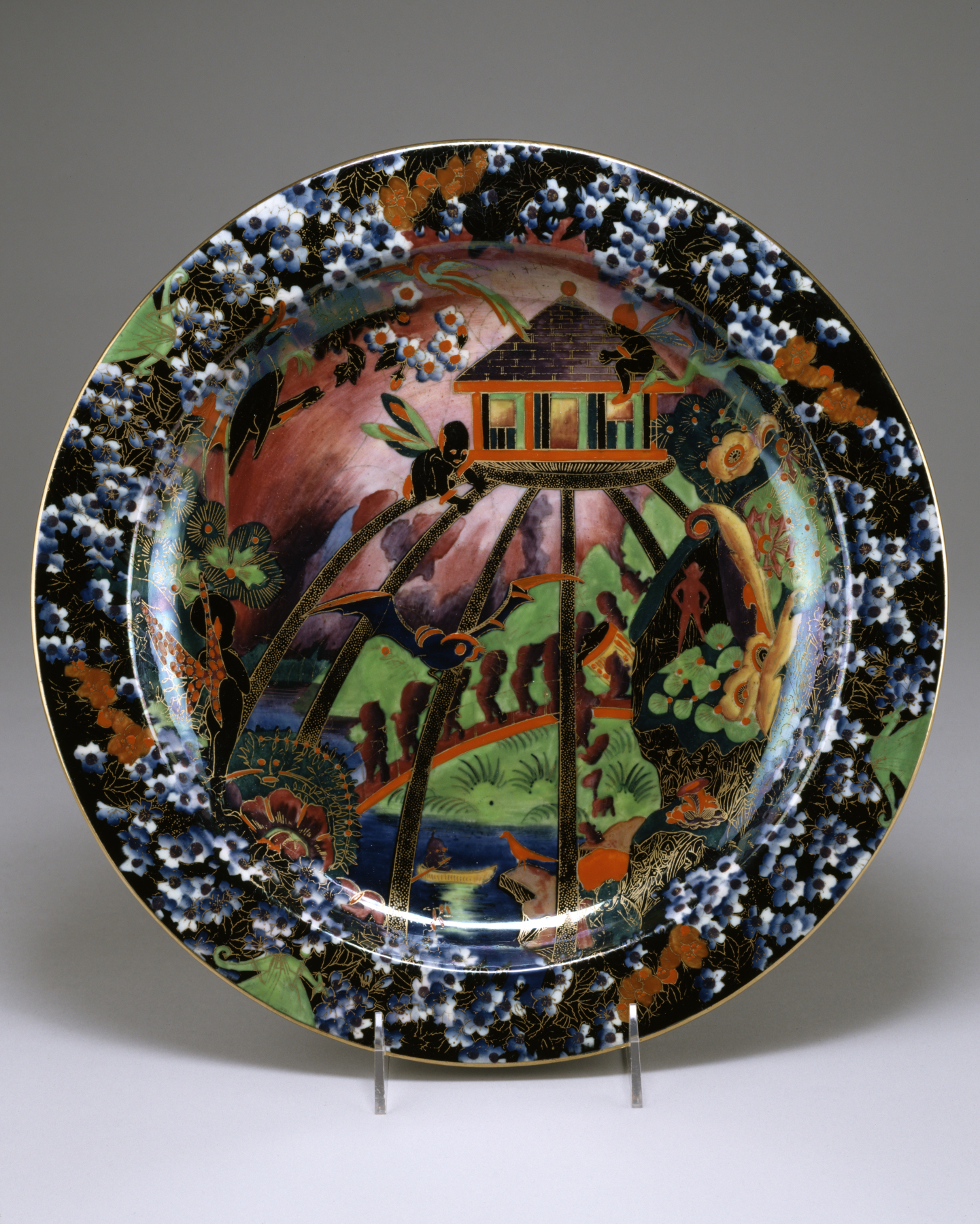
- A Wedgwood plate designed by Makeig-Jones, between 1924 and 1930, in the collection of the Walters Art Museum
- Born: 1881; Wath-upon-Dearne near Rotherham, Yorkshire
- Died: 1945 (aged 63–64)
- Occupation: Pottery designer
- Known for: Fairyland Lustre

Susannah Margaretta "Daisy" Makeig-Jones (1881–1945) was a pottery designer for Wedgwood. She is best known for her Fairyland Lustre series.

Makeig-Jones was born in Wath-upon-Dearne near Rotherham, Yorkshire, the eldest of seven children. Her father, K. Geoffrey Makeig-Jones, was of Welsh descent and was a medical doctor, and her mother was the daughter of Thomas Reeder, a solicitor. Makeig-Jones was taught by a governess at home, then attended a boarding school near Rugby. After her family moved to Torquay, she entered the Torquay School of Art. After discussions with the managing director of Wedgwood, Cecil Wedgwood, Makeig-Jones joined the firm as an apprentice painter in 1909.

After two years at Wedgwood, Makeig-Jones, clearly talented, started to design tableware in 1911. Attracted to the fanciful, she began to design Oriental dragon patterns in 1913. She moved on to her signature Fairyland Lustre design in 1915, a year after the war in Europe started.

These lines were just what were needed at Wedgwood, which was in a slack period when the Fairyland Lustre series was released, according to Nicholas Dawes, an independent New York antiques dealer. "Many Europeans were looking for something to escape from the horrors of war," continues Dawes, who describes the goblins and floating fairies in the pottery's neon landscapes as "escapist stuff, real fantastical."

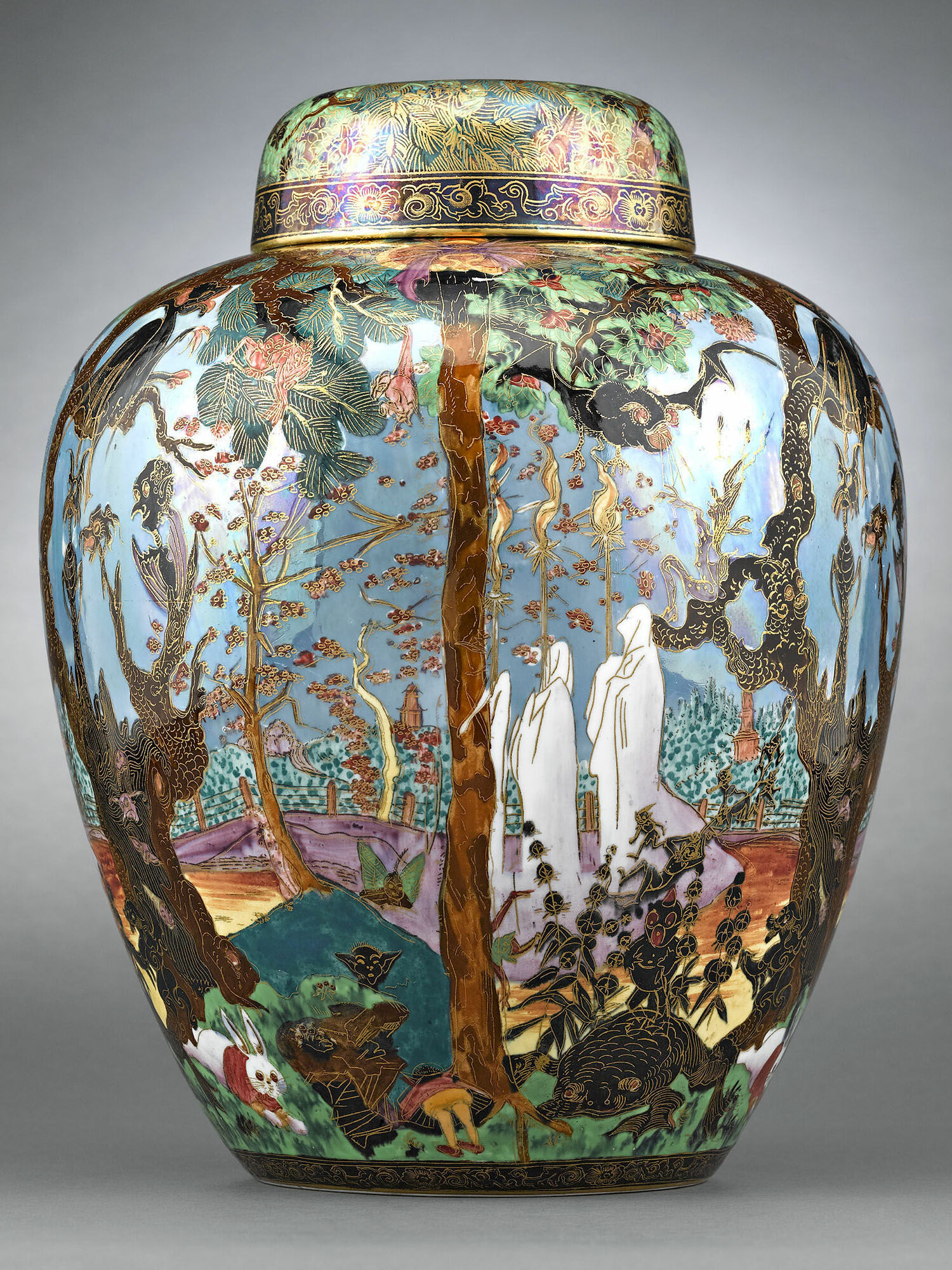
Wedgwood Fairyland Lustre Ghostly Wood Covered Malfrey Pot. c. 1920

Dawes notes that the rise of Makeig-Jones within Wedgwood was unusual not only because she was a woman, but also because she rose from within the company's ranks, an exception to the well-known designers that Wedgwood normally brought in from outside. The Fairyland Lustre line proved immensely popular across the Atlantic during the Roaring 20s, providing Wedgwood a popular and pricey product with which to penetrate the lucrative American market. But soon Makeig-Jones' Art Nouveau fairies faded from fashion. Dawes says it was no surprise that the line was discontinued in 1929.

"It had been around long enough that people were getting tired of it," Dawes continues, "and with the Depression, the American market just dried up." Wedgwood hired a new art director and moved on to a more austere modern style, abandoning the multi-colored lustrous glazes, which were expensive to produce, a luxury that couldn't be afforded during the economic downturn of the 1930s.

Besides, by all contemporary accounts, Makeig-Jones had grown "too big for her station," Dawes says. "She acted as if she was the president of the company and would march around telling people what to do. Eccentric can be good in a designer, but she quickly became a difficult employee. She seemed more interested in fairies and elves and the mythical world than the real one. She was not willing or able to do anything different. What she was doing became passé, so her number was up." In April 1931, she was asked to retire, left in a fury, and her designing days were over.

One of Cecil Wedgwood's daughters, Doris Audrey Wedgwood, married Daisy's brother Thomas Geoffrey Rowland Makeig-Jones in 1928. Daisy Makeig-Jones died in 1945.

From May 1–August 16, 2015, the National Museum of Women in the Arts exhibited Casting a Spell: Ceramics by Daisy Makeig-Jones which focused on her Fairyland Lusterware (decorative china) and her “place in the history of decorative arts as well as her identity as a modern woman and artist.”

== Patterns ==
- Chinoiserie Range: Daventry
- Coq du bois (1923)
- Fairyland Black
- Fairyland Candlemas
- Fairyland Lustre (1915)
- Fairyland Sunset
- Indian Range: Lahore
- Lustre Range: Fruit
- Moa (1923)
- Noah's Ark
- Persian poems: Argus Pheasant
- Persian poems: Nizami
- Yellowstone Zoo (1923)
- Zoo and Cobble Bead (1916)

== Notable collections ==
- Plate Showing Imps on a Bridge and Tree House, Walters Art Museum, Baltimore
- Plate Showing Bubbles and Imps, Wiener Museum of Decorative Arts, Dania Beach, Florida

== Sources ==
- Des Fontaines, Una (1975). Wedgwood fairyland lustre : the work of Daisy Makeig-Jones. New York: Born-Hawes. ISBN 0856670227.
