= Conseil scolaire de district du Grand Nord de l'Ontario =

French-language school board in Ontario, Canada

Conseil scolaire public du Grand Nord de l'Ontario

Location
- Sudbury, Ontario Wawa, Sudbury, Noëlville, Markstay, Sault Ste. Marie, Elliot Lake, Longlac, Marathon, Manitouwadge, Thunder Bay^{[4]} Canada

District information
- Director of education: Marc Gauthier^{[2]}
- Schools: 14 elementary schools 8 high schools^{[3]}
- Budget: CA$65^{[1]} million (2016-2017)
- District ID: B28118

Students and staff
- Students: 2487^{[4]}

Other information
- Elected trustees: Jean-Marc Aubin, président François Boudreau; Julie Olivier; François Boudreau; Anne-Marie Gélineault, vice-présidente Lynn Despatie; Anne-Marie Gélineault (VC); Francine Vaillancourt; Josée Bouchard; Kristy Tourout; Louise Primeau; Lynn Despatie; Robert Boileau; Monique Hébert-Bérubé; Suzanne Nolin; Student Trustees Chlöé Madore-Bouffard; Emma Pinard
- Website: grandnord.ca

The Conseil scolaire du Grand Nord (known as French-language Public District School Board No. 57 prior to 1999) manages the French-language schools in much of Northern Ontario. The area in which this school board operates covers 64,238 km^{2} (24,802 sq mi) of Ontario.^{[2]}

The legal name of the school board is Conseil scolaire du Grand Nord, but it was previously known as:

- Conseil scolaire public du Grand Nord de l'Ontario
- CSPGNO
- Conseil scolaire de District du Grand Nord de l'Ontario

The Conseil scolaire du Grand Nord is a member of the Association des conseils scolaires des écoles publique de l'Ontario (ACÉPO).

== Elementary schools ==
| Elementary school | Location | School identifier |
|---|---|---|
| École publique Camille-Perron | Markstay | 342432 |
| École publique de la Découverte | Val Caron | 174882 |
| École publique Écho-des-Rapides | Sault Ste. Marie | 539197 |
| École publique de l'Escalade | Wawa | 025977 |
| École publique Foyer-Jeunesse | Hanmer | 568961, 646792 |
| École publique Franco-Manitou | Manitouwadge | 332100 |
| École publique Franco-Nord | Azilda | 460338 |
| École publique Hélène-Gravel | Sudbury | 157325 |
| École publique Jean-Éthier-Blais | Sudbury | 408735, 647594 |
| École publique Jeanne-Sauvé | Sudbury | 282898 |
| École publique Pavillon de l'Avenir | Chelmsford | 164909 |
| École publique de la Rivière-des-Français | Noëlville | 138720 |
| École publique des Villageois | Elliot Lake | 164925 |
| École publique des Vents du Nord | Thunder Bay | 438992 |

== High schools ==
| High school | Location | School identifier |
|---|---|---|
| École Cap sur l'Avenir | Sudbury | 955622 |
| École secondaire Château-Jeunesse | Longlac | 912573 |
| École secondaire Cité-Supérieure | Marathon | 924792 |
| École secondaire de la Rivière-des-Français | Noëlville | 138720, 911100 |
| École secondaire Hanmer | Hanmer | 648892, 242853, 646423, 907448 |
| École secondaire Macdonald-Cartier | Sudbury | 327425, 646458, 646440, 907570 |
| École secondaire Manitouwadge | Manitouwadge | 924660 |
| Villa Française des Jeunes | Elliot Lake | 164925, 965570 |

== Other public secular French-language school boards in Ontario ==
There are three other public secular French-language school boards in Ontario:

- Conseil des écoles publiques de l'Est de l'Ontario (CÉPEO)
- Conseil scolaire de district du Nord-Est de l'Ontario (CSDNE)
- Conseil scolaire de district du Centre-Sud-Ouest (CSDCSO)

== See also ==
- Association des conseillers(ères) des écoles publique de l'Ontario
- List of school districts in Ontario
- List of high schools in Ontario
