= Conseil scolaire public du Nord-Est de l'Ontario =

French-language school authority in Ontario, Canada

Location
- North Bay, Ontario Cochrane, Iroquois Falls, Black River-Matheson, Timmins, Kapuskasing, Nipissing Canada

District information
- Superintendent: April Rosenberger, Michel Pagé, Natalie Joncas-Raymond
- Chair of the board: Denis Labelle
- Director of education: Yves Laliberté.
- Schools: 8 elementary schools 6 high schools
- District ID: B28100

Students and staff
- Students: 2127

Other information
- Elected trustees: Denis Labelle, Michel Faucon, Jules Duchesne, Roger Brazeau, Denis Boyer, Nicole Arcand, Jeannette Labrèche, Clara McKinnon, Michel Séguin, Liliane Francis, Mona Henrie-Cadieux, Lucie Paquin
- Website: www.cspne.ca

The Conseil scolaire public du Nord-Est de l'Ontario (CSPNE, formerly the Conseil scolaire de district du Nord-Est de l'Ontario or CSDNE), also known as Ontario District School Board #56, manages the French-language schools in the north-east region of Ontario. The area in which this school board operates covers 46,714 km^{2} (18,036 sq mi) of Ontario.

The CSPNE is a member of the Association des conseillers(ères) des écoles publique de l'Ontario (ACÉPO).

== History ==
Prior to 1 January 1998, the Francophone schools in the north-east region of Ontario were served by 4 different school boards:

- Cochrane-Iroquois Falls, Black River-Matheson
- Timmins
- Kapuskasing
- Nipissing

== Elementary schools ==
School name	Location	Identifier
École publique aux Quatre-Vents	Parry Sound	305470
École publique Héritage	North Bay	236098
École publique Jeunesse Active	Sturgeon Falls	199737
École publique des Navigateurs	New Liskeard	260926
École publique Étoile du Nord	Iroquois Falls	156230
École publique Lionel-Gauthier	Timmins	314242
École publique Le Coeur du Nord	Kapuskasing	165182
École publique Passeport Jeunesse	Hearst	215335
École élémentaire publique Odyssée	North Bay	126258

== High schools ==
School name	Location	Identifier
École publique l'Odyssée	North Bay	909335
École secondaire publique Nipissing Ouest	Sturgeon Falls	946117
École secondaire publique l'Alliance	Iroquois Falls	918296
École secondaire publique Renaissance	Timmins	922870
École secondaire publique Écho du Nord	Kapuskasing	919055
Centre d'apprentissage du Nord-Est de l'Ontario	Various locations	924488
École publique Passeport Jeunesse	North Bay	925199

== Other public French-language school boards in Ontario ==
There are 3 other public French-language school boards in Ontario:

- Conseil des écoles publiques de l'Est de l'Ontario (CÉPEO)
- Conseil scolaire de district du Grand Nord de l'Ontario (CSDGNO)
- Conseil scolaire de district du Centre-Sud-Ouest (CSDCSO)

== See also ==
- Association des conseillers(ères) des écoles publique de l'Ontario
- List of school districts in Ontario
- List of high schools in Ontario
