= Henry Horsey =

Henry Horsey may refer to:

- Henry R. Horsey (1924–2016), American judge
- Henry Herbert Horsey (1871–1942), Canadian athlete, businessman and politician
- Henry Horsey (architect), Canadian architect who designed the original Renfrew County Courthouse
