= Pembroke, Ontario =

City in Ontario, Canada

Pembroke
- City (single-tier)
- City of Pembroke
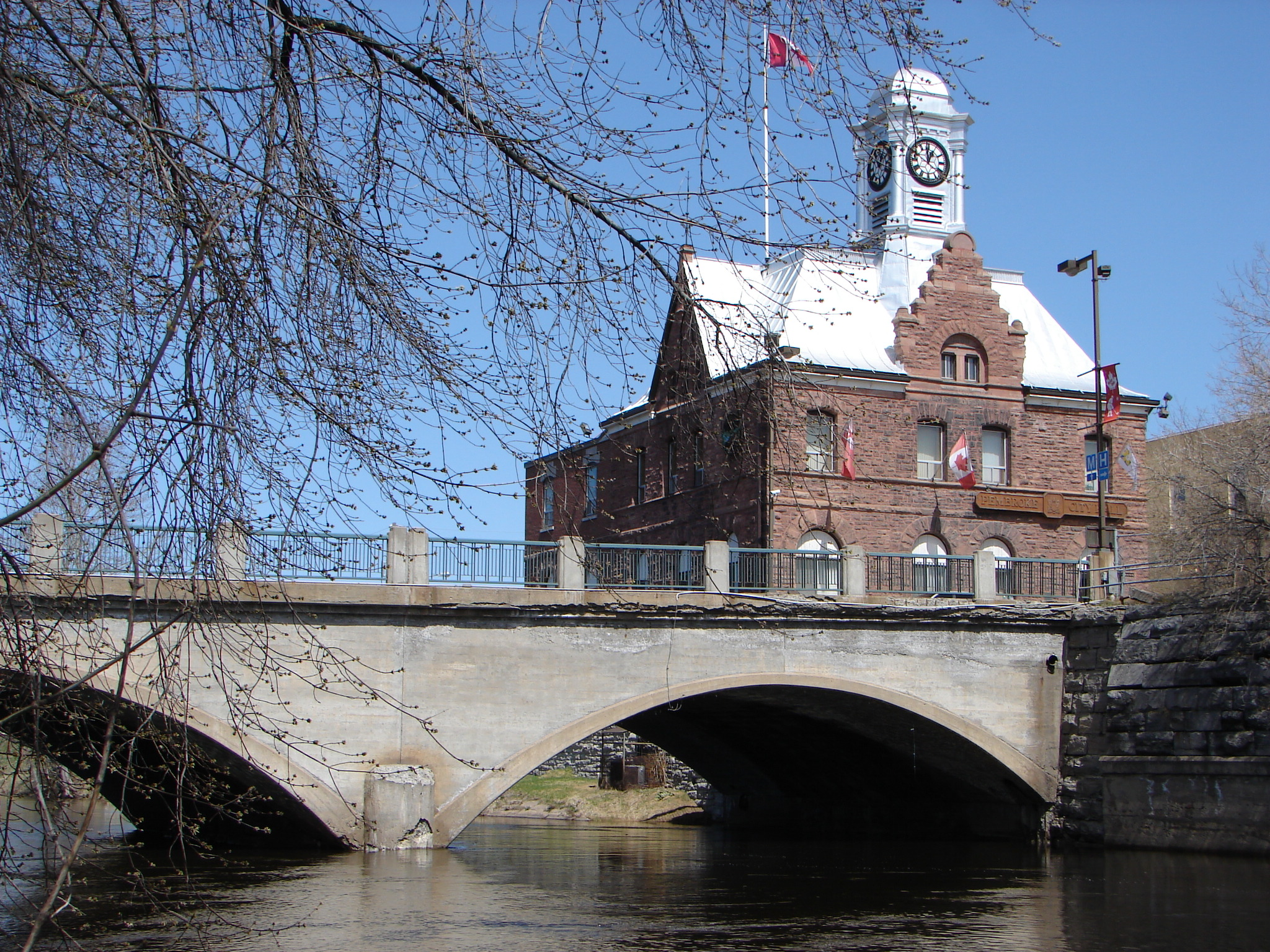
- Pembroke Street Bridge crossing the Muskrat River, with City Hall in the background.

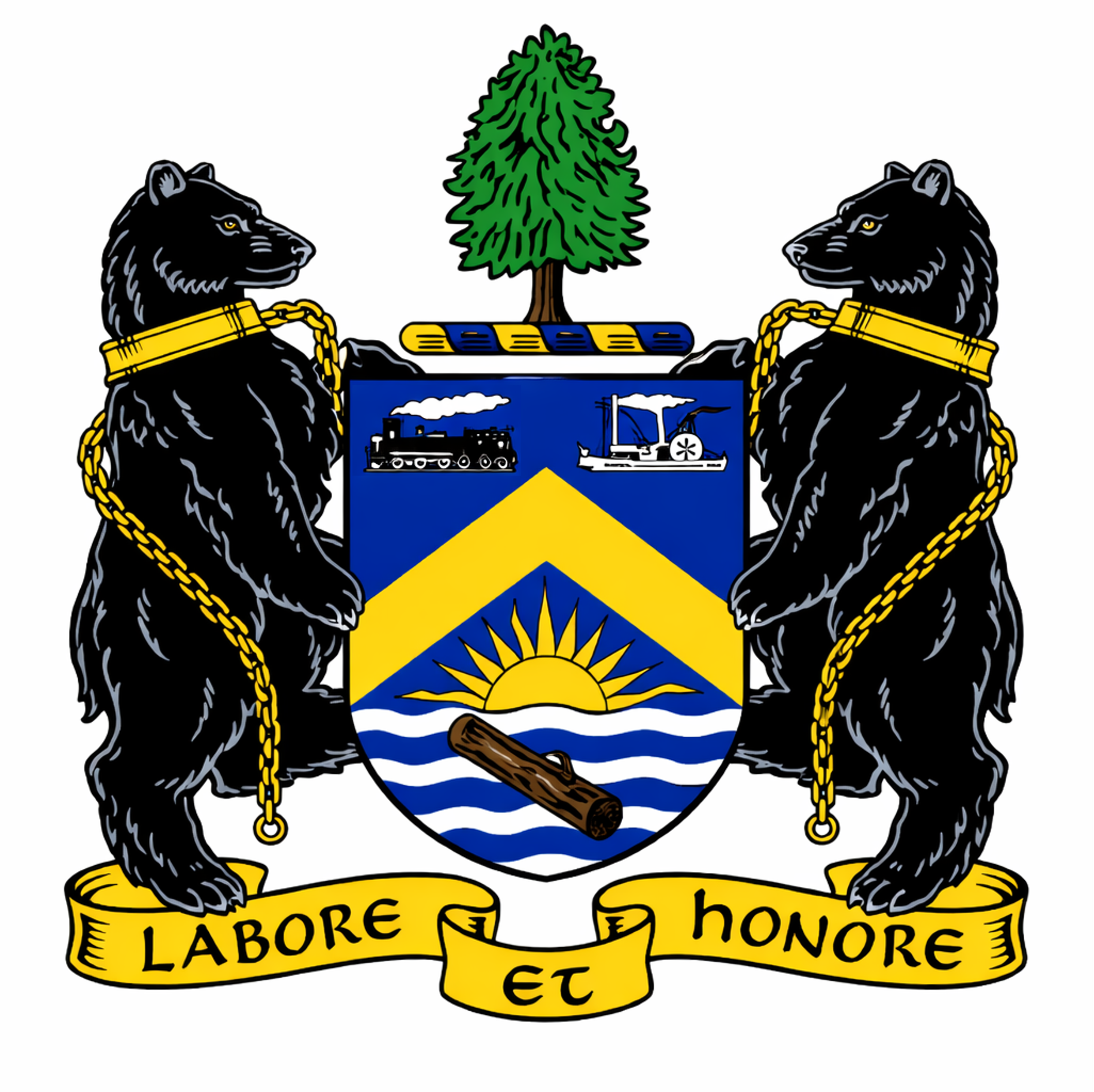
- Flag Coat of arms Logo
- Nickname: The Heart of the Ottawa Valley
- Motto: "Labore et Honore"
- Location of Pembroke, Ontario
- Coordinates: 45°49′N 077°06′W
- Country: Canada
- Province: Ontario
- Region: Eastern Ontario
- Subregion: Ottawa Valley
- County: Renfrew (independent)
- Founded: 1828
- Established: 1856 (unincorporated police village)
- Incorporated: 1877 (town); 1971 (city)
- Named for: George Herbert, 11th Earl of Pembroke
- Neighbourhoods: East End, West End, Centre Core, Downtown, Industrial Park

Government
  - Type: Mayor–Council
  - Body: Pembroke City Council
  - Mayor (Mayor-Elect): Ron Gervais (Stephanie LeMay)
  - Governing Body: City Council
  - MP: Cheryl Gallant
  - MPP: Billy Denault

Area
  - Land: 14.32 km^{2} (5.53 sq mi)
- Elevation: 130 m (430 ft)

Population (2021)
  - Total: 14,364
  - Density: 1,002.8/km^{2} (2,597/sq mi)
  - Dwellings: 6,888
- Time zone: UTC−5 (EST)
  - Summer (DST): UTC−4 (EDT)
- Postal Code: K8A to K8B
- Area codes: 613, 343
- Website: pembroke.ca

Pembroke (/ˈpɛmbrʊk/ PEM-brook) is a city in Eastern Ontario, Canada, located at the confluence of the Muskrat River and the Ottawa River in the Ottawa Valley. It lies approximately 145 kilometres (90 mi) northwest of Ottawa. It serves as the county seat of Renfrew County and functions as a regional administrative, judicial, healthcare, and commercial centre for surrounding communities, independent of the county government.

Historically, Pembroke developed as an important centre of the Ottawa Valley lumber trade, a role that shaped its early growth and institutional development. As of the 2021 Census, the city had a population of 14,364.

== Etymology and Origins of Name ==
=== Etymology ===
The modern English form of the word Pembroke reflects the Anglo-Norman adaptation of the original Welsh name, illustrating how medieval British territorial identities were carried forward into later aristocratic titles and, ultimately, into colonial place names throughout the British Empire.

The name Pembroke derives from the Old British Pennbrog, preserved in modern Welsh as Penfro. The name combines pen (“head” or “end”) with bro (“region” or “country”), and has been interpreted to mean either “land’s end” or “headland.”

In the medieval period, Penfro was one of the principal cantrefs (administrative districts) of the Kingdom of Dyfed. Its administrative centre was located at present-day Pembroke in what is now the County of Pembrokeshire.

=== Origins of Name ===
While the true origin of naming the community as Pembroke is unknown, two possible theories have been revealed as possible options:

==== Rumoured Theory ====
The City of Pembroke, Ontario, takes its name from: George Herbert, 11th Earl of Pembroke. In the mid-19th century, British naming conventions in Upper Canada often honoured aristocratic titles rather than specific individuals. The title was associated with the Earl of Pembroke’s son, Sidney Herbert, a prominent British statesman who served as Secretary of State for War and briefly as Secretary of State for the Colonies. The 11th Earl of Pembroke died in 1827 While the town was not named directly after Herbert himself, the adoption of Pembroke reflects contemporary British naming conventions that often honoured aristocratic titles rather than individuals.

===== Proposed Theory =====
One local author has suggested another possible theory, that is Pembroke was chosen for its Welsh name, to go along with other important communities in the area during the early 19th century, such as: Westmeath (County Westmeath, Ireland), Renfrew (Renfrewshire, Scotland), and Pembroke (Pembrokeshire, Wales). You will note that each of these municipalities from the British Isles were county names.

The use of the name Pembroke to describe the local area is documented by at least 1838, when legislation passed by the Legislature of the Province of Upper Canada establishing the County of Renfrew listed the Township of Pembroke among the affected townships assigned to the newly created District of Bathurst.

Campbelltown became Lowertown, while Miramichi was renamed first to Moffatville, then to Sydenham. In 1856, the two settlements—Lowertown and Sydenham—were unified and unincorporated as the police Village of Pembroke.

== History ==
=== Indigenous Presence and Early Recorded History ===
==== (Pre-Contact – early 1800s) ====
Archaeological evidence indicates that the Ottawa Valley around present-day Pembroke has been inhabited by Algonquin Anishinaabe peoples for thousands of years, long before European contact. The area lies within the unceded traditional territory of the Algonquin nation, who know the Ottawa River as the Kichi Sibi (meaning "Great River") and have used it for millennia as a travel and trade corridor connecting the Great Lakes with the St. Lawrence region. Seasonal migration patterns saw Algonquin families gather along the river in warmer months for fishing, hunting, and trade, then disperse to inland hunting camps during the winter. This riverine territory was a hub of intertribal exchange and later became an important route for early European fur traders.

=== Early History ===
The first European settler to the area now known as Pembroke was Daniel Fraser in 1823, who squatted on land that was discovered to have been granted to a man named Abel Ward. Ward later sold the land (on land near the present-day commercial core) to Fraser, and nearby Fraser Street is named after the family.

Peter White, a veteran of the Royal Navy arrived in 1828, squatting beside Fraser on the land where the lower parking lot is located, beneath the Metro grocery store. Other settlers followed, attracted by the growing lumbering operations of the area.

Originally named Miramichi, Pembroke became a police village in 1856.

Map of Pembroke

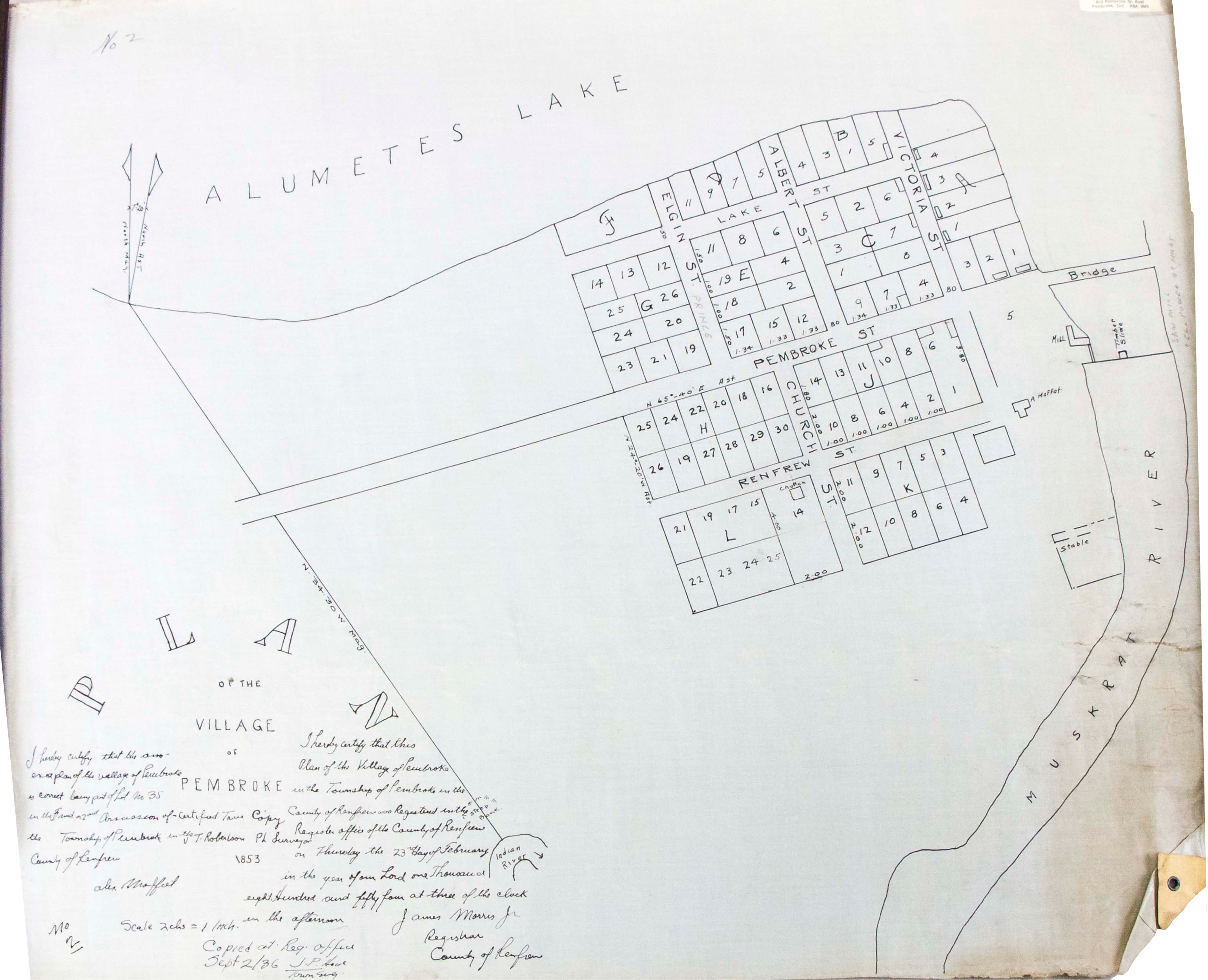
in 1853

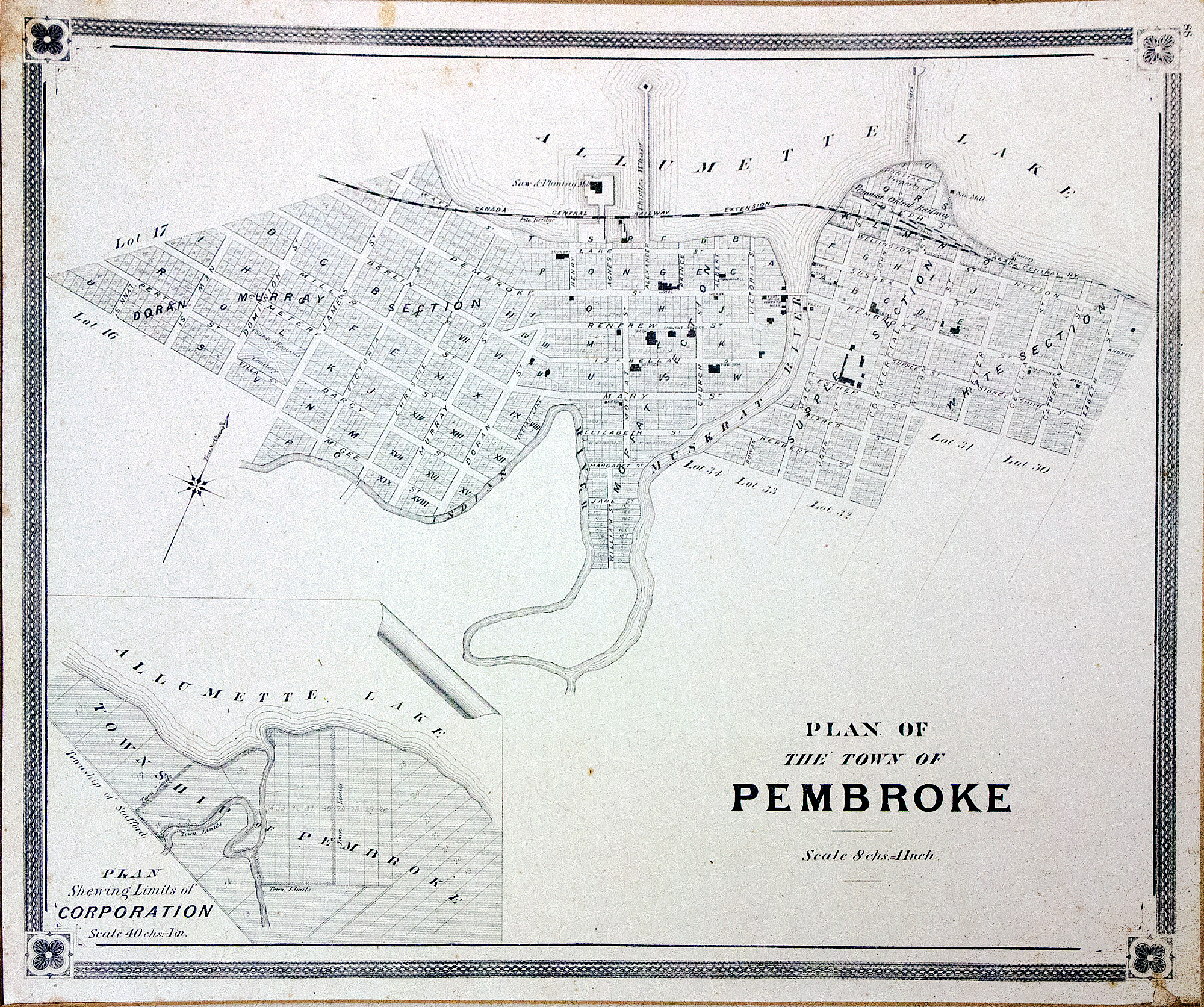
in 1880

Pembroke was incorporated as a town in 1878 and as a city in 1971. It was named seat for Renfrew County in 1861. This set the stage for construction shortly thereafter on the Renfrew County Courthouse, which was finished in 1867, and the arrival of many civil servants, much wealth and much construction. Between the 1860s and the early 20th century, Pembroke experienced significant institutional and architectural development following its designation as the county seat. A fire in 1918 destroyed much of Pembroke's downtown.

The Renfrew County Courthouse, completed in 1867, later underwent restoration and adaptive reuse between 2005 and 2007. The building includes preserved courtroom spaces and former jail cells. Historical records indicate that three executions occurred at the courthouse gallows between the 1870s and 1952.

Other historic buildings that survived the fire in Pembroke include a historic synagogue, two original hospitals, the Dunlop Mansion (which served as the Grey Gables Inn until its permanent closure), the 'Munroe Block' downtown, and two houses belonging to the White family. A fire in 1918 downtown destroyed many buildings, including the Pembroke Opera House.

In 1898 Pembroke became the seat of the Roman Catholic Diocese of Pembroke.

=== Forest Fire Prevention ===
The Pembroke Forest Fire District was founded by Ontario's former Department of Lands and Forests (now the MNR) in 1922 as one of 17 districts to help protect Ontario's forests from fire by early detection from fire towers. The headquarters for the district were housed in the town. It was the central location for 15 fire tower lookouts, including the towers in Algonquin Park. The 15 towers included: Wilberforce, Mt. Edna, Sherwood, Murchison, Preston, Clancy, Fitzgerald, Brent, Big Crow Lake, White Trout Lake, Stonecliffe, Deux Rivières, Osler, Lauder and Skymount. When a fire was spotted in the forest a towerman would get the degree bearings from his respective tower and radio back the information to headquarters. When one or more towermen from other towers in the area would also call in their bearings, the forest rangers at headquarters could get a 'triangulation' read and plot the exact location of the fire on their map. This way a team of forest firefighters could be dispatched as soon as possible to get the fire under control. These towers would all be phased out after aerial fire fighting techniques were employed in the 1970s.

== Demographics ==
Historical census populations – Pembroke, Ontario

Year	Pop.	±%
1841	250	—
1871	1,508	+503.2%
1881	2,820	+87.0%
1891	4,401	+56.1%
1901	5,156	+17.2%
1911	5,626	+9.1%
1921	7,875	+40.0%

Year	Pop.	±%
1931	9,368	+19.0%
1941	10,999	+17.4%
1951	12,704	+15.5%
1961	16,791	+32.2%
1971	16,544	−1.5%
1981	14,026	−15.2%
1991	13,997	−0.2%

Year	Pop.	±%
1996	14,177	+1.3%
2001	13,490	−4.8%
2006	13,930	+3.3%
2011	14,360	+3.1%
2016	13,882	−3.3%
2021	14,364	+3.5%

Source: Statistics Canada

In the 2021 Census of Population conducted by Statistics Canada, Pembroke had a population of 14,364 living in 6,542 of its 6,888 total private dwellings, a change of 3.5% from its 2016 population of 13,882. With a land area of 14.32 km^{2} (5.53 sq mi), it had a population density of 1,003.1/km^{2} (2,597.9/sq mi) in 2021.

Canada census – Pembroke community profile

	2021	2016	2011
Population	14,364 (+3.5% from 2016)	13,882 (-3.3% from 2011)	14,360 (3.1% from 2006)
Land area	14.32 km^{2} (5.53 sq mi)	14.56 km^{2} (5.62 sq mi)	14.35 km^{2} (5.54 sq mi)
Population density	1,002.8/km^{2} (2,597/sq mi)	953.3/km^{2} (2,469/sq mi)	1,000.7/km^{2} (2,592/sq mi)
Median age	46.4 (M: 42.8, F: 50)	47.2 (M: 43.6, F: 50.8)	46.7 (M: 43.3, F: 49.0)
Private dwellings	6,888 (total) 6,542 (occupied)	6,685 (total) 6,198 (occupied)	6,594 (total)
Median household income	$63,200	$50,051

References: 2021 2016 2011

== Economy ==
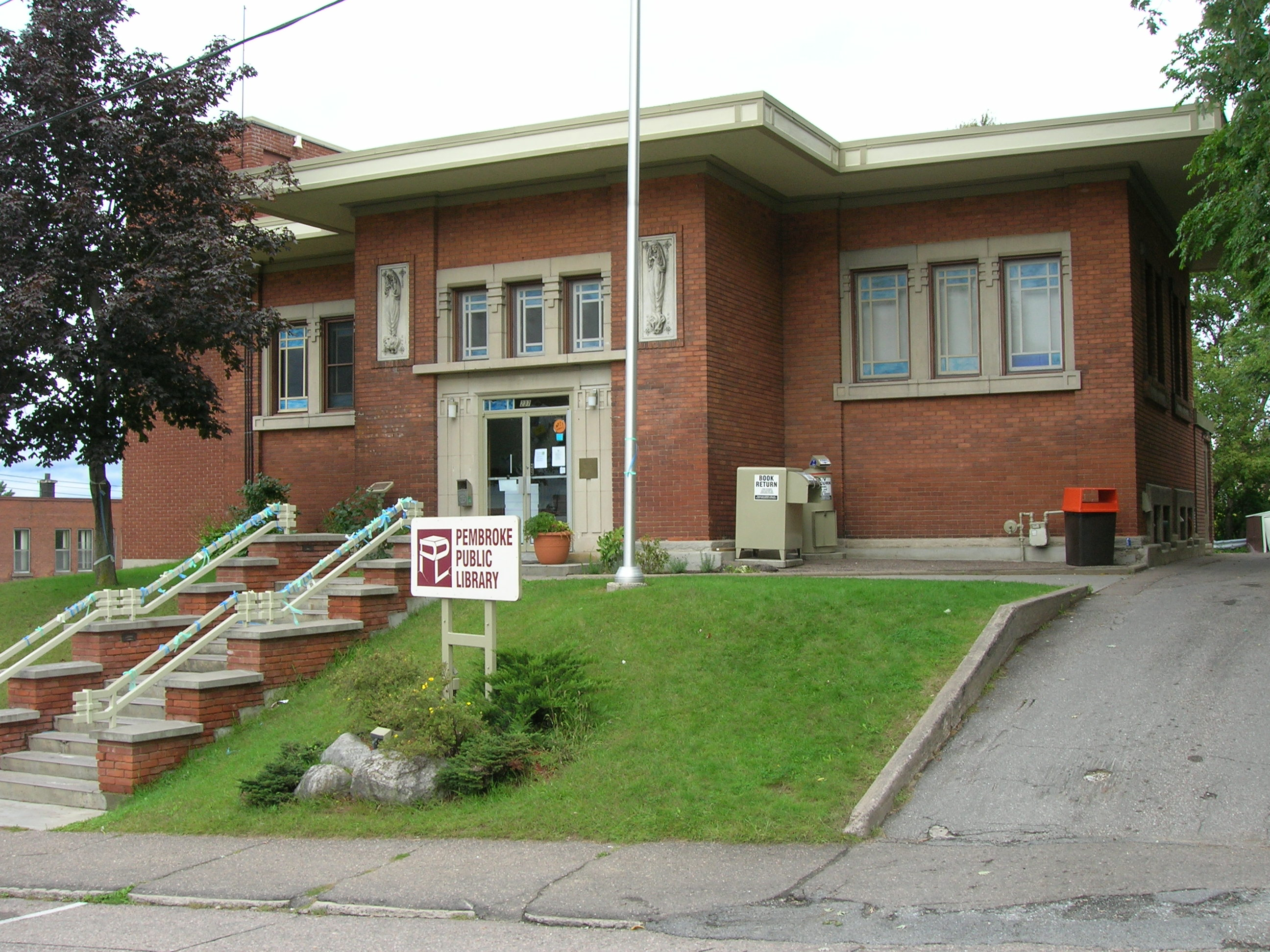
The Pembroke Public Library, designed by architect Francis Conroy Sullivan, was completed in 1914.

Pembroke functions as a regional commercial and service centre for the Upper Ottawa Valley, situated approximately midway between Ottawa and North Bay.

Historically, forestry and farming formed the backbone of the local economy and remain important today. Local timber products include lumber, plywood, veneer, hydro poles and fibreboard. Other local manufacturing operations produce office furniture.

CFB Petawawa in nearby Petawawa and Chalk River Laboratories of Canadian Nuclear Laboratories in Chalk River are also regional employers. Chalk River Laboratories is being restructured to a GOCO (Government Owned, Contractor Operated) Laboratory.

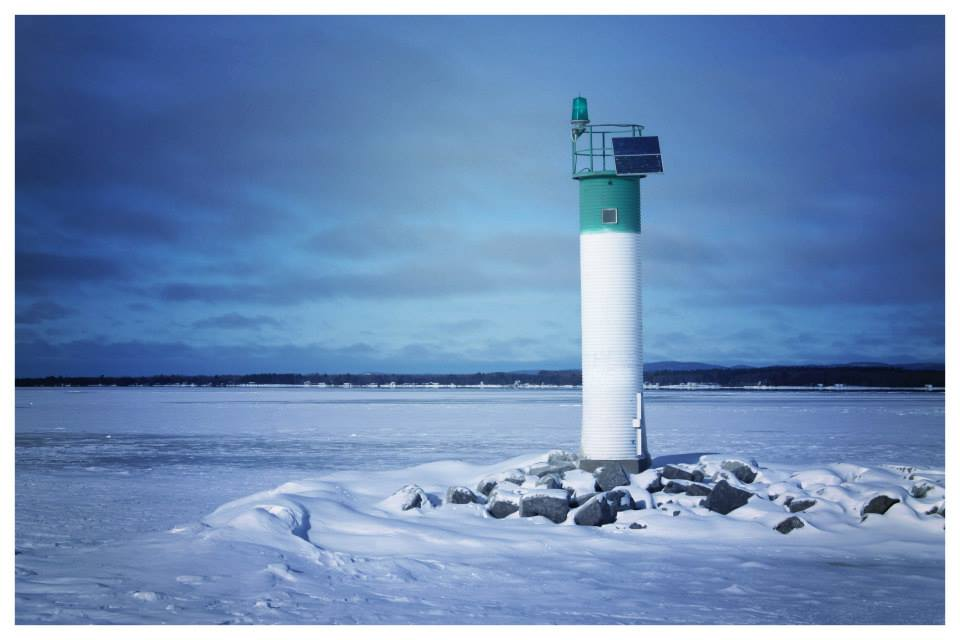
Pembroke Marina Lighthouse on the Ottawa River in winter

The economy also benefits from tourism, aided partly by Pembroke's location on the Trans-Canada Highway. Pembroke is a gateway to natural adventures on the Petawawa and Ottawa Rivers, Algonquin Park and to world-class white water rafting a short distance to the southwest.

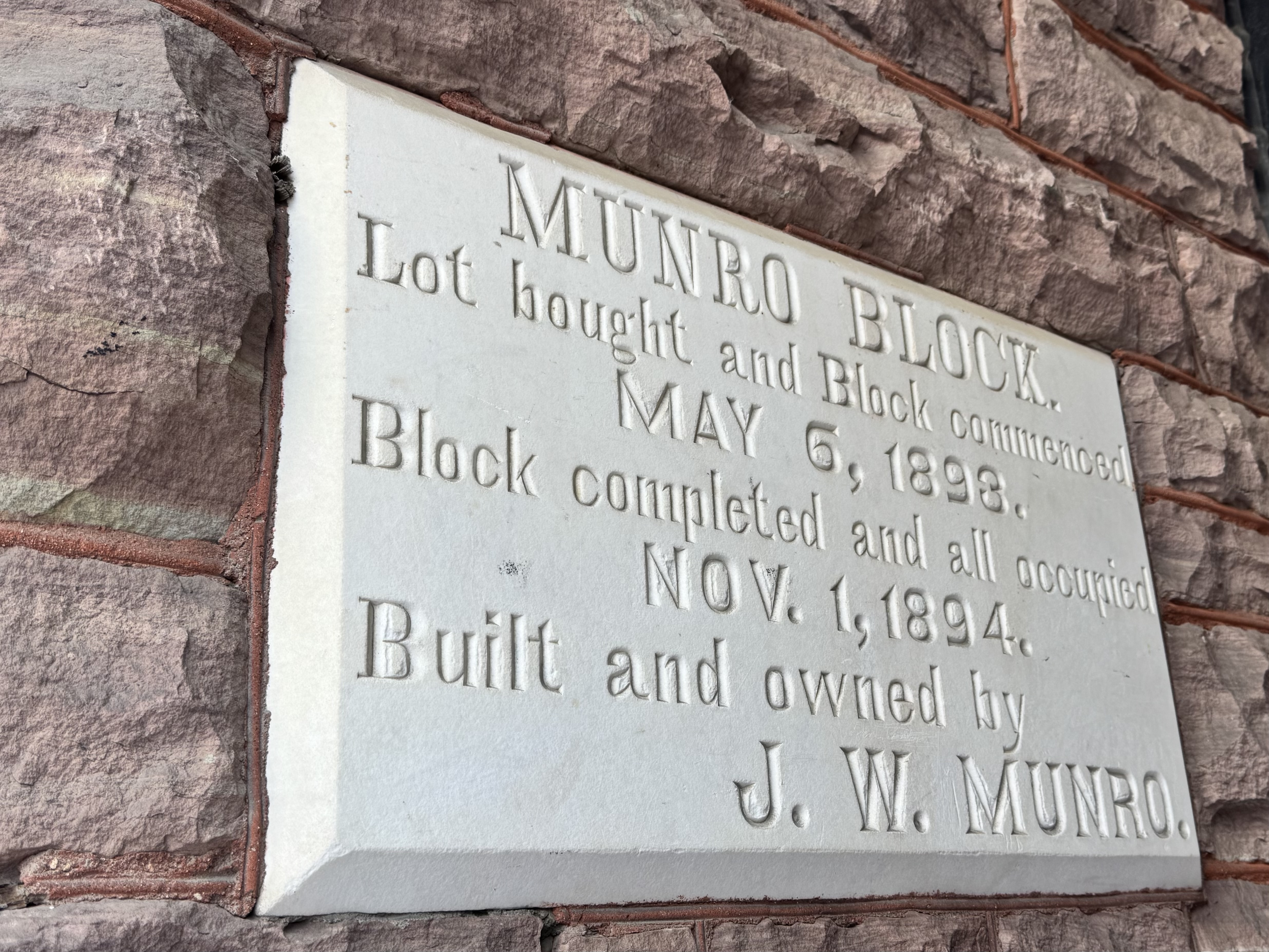
Historical plaque mounted on the Munro Block in Pembroke, Ontario, Canada. The plaque records the construction dates and original ownership of the building by J. W. Munro in the 1890s.

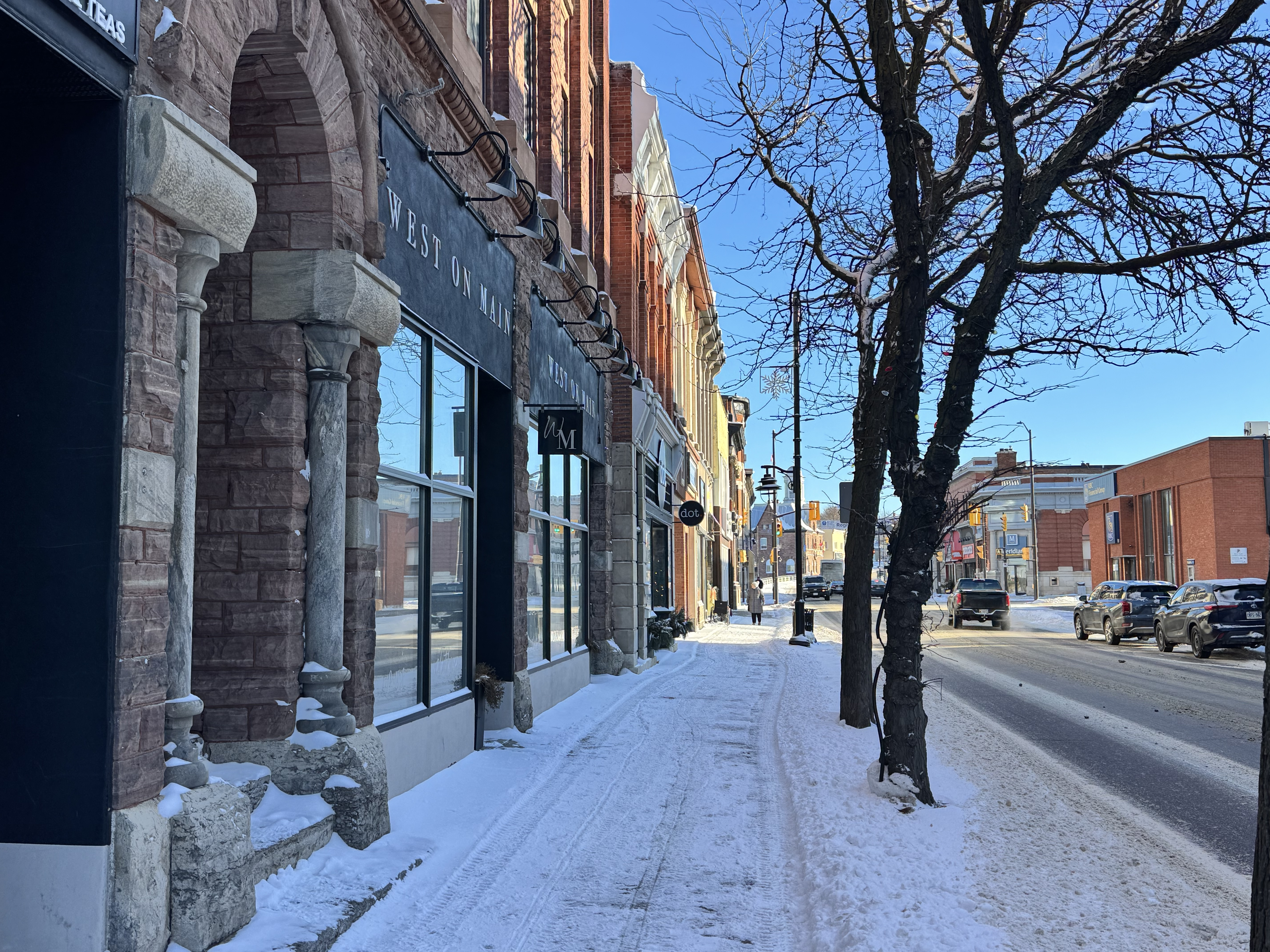
Sidewalk-level view of the Munro Block on Main Street in Pembroke, Ontario, Canada. The image highlights the stone facade, storefronts, and architectural details of the historic commercial block during winter.

== Government and public administration ==
=== Municipal ===
==== Municipal Government ====
The Corporation of the City of Pembroke is the legal entity representing the municipal government of Pembroke, Ontario. Like all municipal corporations in Ontario, it is established under provincial legislation and is responsible for delivering local services, enforcing bylaws, and managing public assets within its jurisdiction. The purpose of a municipal corporation is to provide governance and administration at the local level, including services such as infrastructure maintenance, land use planning, public safety, recreation, and community development.

==== Neighbourhoods ====
According to Schedule "B" of the City of Pembroke’s Official Plan, the city is divided into several neighbourhoods:

- East End
- West End
- Centre Core
- Downtown
- Industrial Park

==== Municipal Government Structure ====
Pembroke operates under a strong-mayor-council system, currently in a government form, with one mayor and six councillors elected at large. As of 2026, the mayor-elect of Pembroke is Stephanie LeMay.

The Corporation of the City of Pembroke day-to-day operations are supervised by the Chief Administration Officer, and department leads (i.e. Director of Operations, Fire Chief, etc.).

==== Elections ====
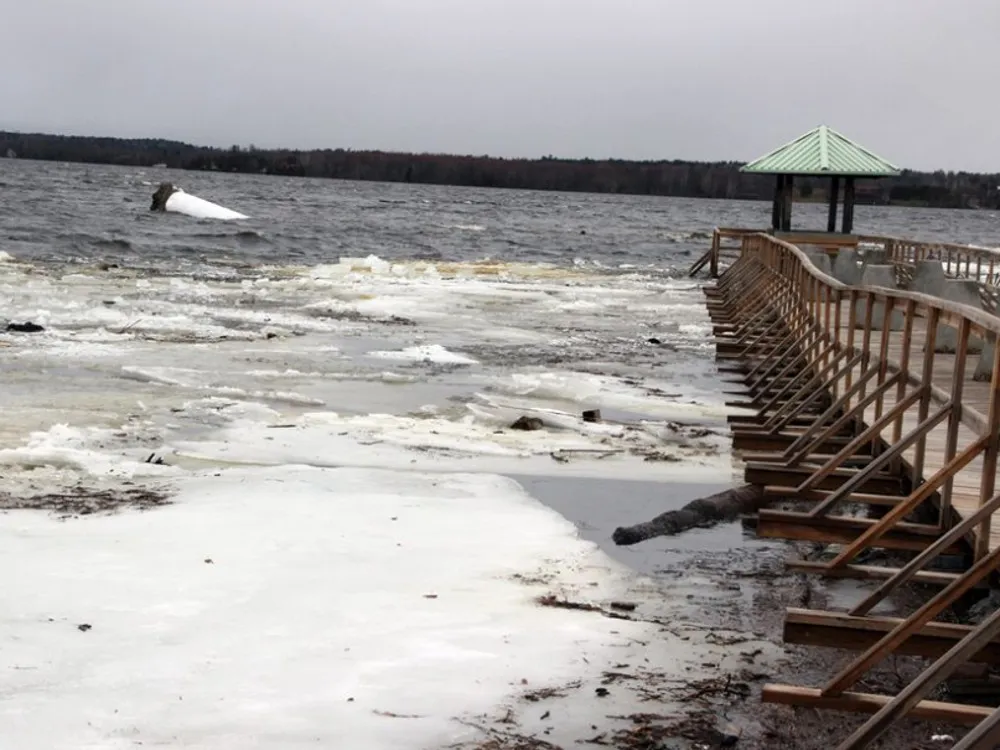
Former Pembroke lighthouse, downed by a flood in April 2019.

Voters elect a mayor and six councillors using a first-past-the-post system, where candidates receiving the highest number of votes secure the positions; the deputy mayor is designated from among the elected councillors. The City of Pembroke's municipal elections are conducted under the authority of Ontario's Municipal Elections Act, 1996, with council members elected every four years on the fourth Monday of October. The most recent election occurred on October 26, 2026, with the next scheduled for October 2030.

===== 2026 election results =====
The 2026 municipal election featured a competitive field of six mayoral candidates and 14 candidates vying for seats on Pembroke City Council. Although the campaign officially began in May, campaigning intensified around Labour Day in September as candidates increased their public appearances, community engagement, and outreach efforts.

The mayoral race largely centred on three prominent contenders: incumbent Mayor Ron Gervais, incumbent Deputy Mayor Brian Abdallah, and Stephanie LeMay, a political newcomer and former federal public servant.

2026 Ontario municipal elections, City of Pembroke:

Candidate	Number of Votes	Office
LeMay, Stephanie (X)	1,545	Mayor
Abdallah, Brian	1,518	Mayor
Gervais, Ron	1,278	Mayor
Slaughter, Griffith	261	Mayor
Michaelis, Bill	164	Mayor
Sambey, Stanley	23	Mayor
Kuehl, Ian (X)	2,534	Councillor
Law, Jamie (X)	2,457	Councillor
Zingel, Krista (X)	2,293	Councillor
Plummer, Andrew (X)	2,071	Councillor
Lapierre, Terry (X)	1,924	Councillor
Purcell, Troy (X)	1,905	Councillor
Behnke, Shawn	1,516	Councillor
Bair-Patel, Dez	1,313	Councillor
Fuisz, Elise	1,302	Councillor
Allard-Auclair, Dominique	1,090	Councillor
Connor, Jeremy	1,003	Councillor
Mulroy, Patrick	681	Councillor
Polsri-Muth, Kanungnit (Nita)	760	Councillor
Parent, Michael	382	Councillor

Out of 13,079 eligible electors, 4,844 voted (37.04%).

===== 2022 election results =====
2022 Ontario municipal elections, City of Pembroke:

Candidate	Number of Votes	Office
Ron Gervais (X)	Acclaimed	Mayor
Brian Abdallah (X)	2,238	Deputy Mayor
Ian Kuehl (X)	1,935	Councillor
Andrew Plummer (X)	1,855	Councillor
Patricia (Pat) Lafreniere (X)	1,800	Councillor
Ed Jaycno (X)	1,433	Councillor
Troy Purcell (X)	1,146	Councillor
Stacey Taylor	1,089	
Dan Callaghan	1,073	
Dorian Pearce	1,006	
Jane Wood	882	
Chéla Breckon	808	
Karen Walsh	658	
Jason Laronde	480	
Andrew (Andy) Clark	457	
Wade Wallace	338	

Out of 10,375 eligible electors, 3,633 voted (35.02%).

=== Mayors ===
1877–current
No.	Portrait	Name	Term Start	Term End	Notes
46		Stephanie LeMay	2026	2030	First female mayor of Pembroke. Daughter of Mayor Michael LeMay.
45		Ronald (Ron) H. Gervais	2022	2026	
44		Michael LeMay	2014	2022	
43		Ed Jacyno	2003	2014	
42		Bob Pilot	2000	2003	
41		Les Scott	1994	2000	
40		Terance V. McCann	1988	1994	
36 (3 of 3)		Angus A. Campbell	1981	1988	
39		Henry V. Brown	1975	1980	
38		George Abdallah	1973	1974	
36 (2 of 3)		Angus A. Campbell	1971	1972	Town of Pembroke is redesignated as a city.
37		William K. Kutschke	1966	1970	
36 (1 of 3)		Angus A. Campbell	1960	1965	
35		A.A. Wallace	1958	1959	
34		J.J. Carmody	1950	1957	
33		Chas. E. Campbell	1948	1949	
32		Wallace J. Fraser	1942	1947	
31		F.W. Beatty	1939	1941	
30		A.E. Cockburn	1936	1938	
29		Matthew McKay	1935	1935	
28		John Courtland Bradley	1934	1934	
27		George D. Biggs	1931	1933	
26		J.M. Taylor	1928	1930	
25		J.P. Duff	1926	1927	
24		L.S. Barrand	1924	1925	
23		W.I. Smyth	1922	1923	
22		D.A. Jones	1920	1921	
21		W.R. Beatty	1918	1919	
20		Edward Behan	1916	1917	
19		James L. Morris	1914	1915	
18		William Leacy	1912	1913	
17		W.L. Hunter	1910	1911	
16		J.S. Fraser	1907	1909	
15		Isidore Martin	1907	1907	
14		William H. Bromley	1905	1906	
13		George Delahaye	1903	1904	
12		Peter White	1901	1901	
11		John P. Millar	1901	1901	
10		Thomas Murray	1897	1900	
9		F.E. Fortin	1891	1896	
8		William R. White	1891	1893	
7		Thomas Deacon	1890	1890	
6		William Murray	1888	1890	
5		Archibald Foster	1885	1887	
4		Walter Beatty	1883	1884	
3		John H. Metcalfe	1882	1882	
2		W.W. Dickson	1879	1881	
1		William Moffat	1877	1878	Planned the original village of Pembroke. First postmaster of Pembroke.

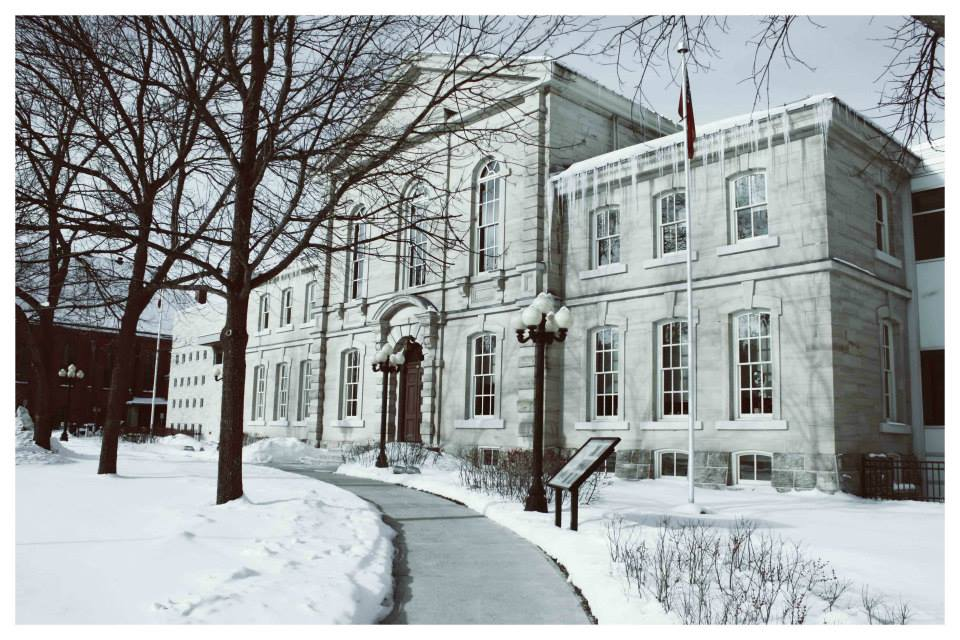
Renfrew County Courthouse in Pembroke, completed in 1867

== Roads, Routes, and Trails ==
The evolution of Pembroke’s street names tells the story of the town itself. In the early nineteenth century, when Upper Canada was surveyed into concession grids, Streets imposed geometric order upon the landscape, forming the straight commercial and residential corridors of the emerging townsite. Roads often followed older travel routes, connecting river landings, mills, and neighbouring settlements long before municipal boundaries were firmly defined.

As Pembroke grew in the late nineteenth and early twentieth centuries, Avenues and Boulevards reflected civic ambition and refinement, borrowing from broader North American and European planning ideals. The post-war rise of the automobile reshaped subdivision design, introducing curving Drives, looping Crescents and Circles, and quiet residential Courts and Places, each designed to reduce through-traffic and prioritize domestic privacy. Lanes preserved the language of narrower service routes, while Terraces carried echoes of British nomenclature and modest elevation.

Beyond these neighbourhood forms, the designation Highway signaled Pembroke’s integration into provincial transportation networks, binding the local community to the wider economy of Ontario. Together, these roadway types chart the municipality’s transformation from surveyed frontier settlement to modern city, each suffix marking a distinct phase in planning philosophy, mobility, and civic identity.

== The Odonymy of Pembroke ==
Street name	Street type	Established	Named after (eponym)	Significance and Notes
Agnes	Street			
Albert	Street	c. 1858	Prince Albert of Saxe-Coburg and Gotha	Was the husband of Queen Victoria; Consort of the British monarch.
Alexander	Street	C. 1858	Alexander Moffat?	
Alfred	Street		A farmer	
Alfred St. East	Street		“ ”	
Almira	Street			
Angus Campbell	Drive	c. 1980s	Angus A. Campbell	Named in recognition of his service as mayor
Apple Blossom	Drive			
Arnolds	Lane			
Bell	Street			
Belmont	Avenue			
Bennett	Street			PM Bennett?
Blakely	Crescent			
Blakely Cres. West	Crescent			
Boundary	Road		The boundary between the Township of Pembroke and the Township of Stafford.	The City of Pembroke owns and is responsible for the maintenance of the road.
Boundary Rd East	Road		Continuation of Boundary Rd.	Note, that the boundary between municipalities moves south from this road.
Broadview	Drive			
Bronx	Street		The Bronx	One of the five boroughs of New York City.
Carmody	Street		John Joseph “Jack” Carmody	Mayor of Pembroke for eight (8) years.
Catherine	Street		Catherine White	Daughter of Peter White
Catherine St South	Street			
Cecelia	Street		Cecelia White	Peter White’s Wife
Cecil	Street			
Cedar Brae	Drive			
Cedar	Lane			
Centre	Street			
Chamberlain	Street		David Chamberlain	Town’s First Assessor, c. 1877.
Christie	Street			
Christink	Lane			
Church	Street		Location of the first church in the Village (downtown area) of Pembroke.	
Clemow	Avenue			
Cockburn	Crescent		John Cockburn	(https://en.wikipedia.org/wiki/Pointer_boat) Pointer points
Coolidge	Street			
Cooper	Street			
Craig	Street			
Crandall	Street			
D'Arcy	Street			
D'Youville	Drive		Marie-Marguerite d'Youville	Grey Sisters of the Immaculate Conception
Deacon	Street			
Dickson	Street		Dr. W.W. Dickson (1879–1881)	_{Office: Mayor of Pembroke} 1879–1881
Dominion	Street	C. 1867	Dominion of Canada	In celebration of the creation of the dominion, a self-governing country that was part of the British Empire and then the British Commonwealth of Nations, especially in the first half of the 20th century
Doran	Street		John Doran	_{Director, Pembroke Docking Company, 1873} _{Or} _{Judge of the Superior Court of Justice (1826–} _{warden of the united counties of Lanark and Renfrew, in 1854 and in 1868} _{He was appointed magistrate, Pembroke, in 1851 (The Canadian Biographical Dictionary and Portrait Gallery of Eminent and Self Made Men 1880, #)}
Douglas	Street			
Draper	Street			
Dunlop	Street		John Dunlop? (1815-1903) (Bennett 2011)	
Eddy	Street		Eddy Match?	
Eganville	Road	c.1890s	Village of Eganville (John Egan)	The original road to travel to Eganville, Ontario. Within the Township of Bonnechere Valley, was is named after John Egan.
Elizabeth	Street		Elizabeth White	Wife of Peter White
Ellis	Avenue			
Estelle	Street			Daughter of Daniel Fraser?
Esther	Street		Esther Supple (née Rowan)	Wife of John Supple, early settler of Pembroke that owned land where Esther St is.
Esther	Street			
Everett	Street			
First	Avenue			
First Ave North	Avenue			
Fischer	Street			
Flora	Street			
Forced	Road			Was once called Government Rd.
Francis	Street			
Frank Nighbor	Street	c. 1980s	Frank Nighbor	Street named after Frank Nighbor, a Canadian professional ice hockey player who played for the Ottawa Senators in the early National Hockey League era. Nighbor was a prominent figure in the development of professional hockey in Canada.
Fraser	Street		Daniel Fraser (1803-1877)	Fraser arrived in the area in the early 19th century; the street takes its name from him
Fraser Lane	Street			
First Responders	Way		First Responders	Originally called Fred Blackstein Boulavard.
Fringewood	Street			
Front	Street			
Garden	Street			
George	Street			
Giroux	Street		Giroux Family	
Glenwood	Drive			
Gordon	Street			
Gourley	Avenue			
Greenside	Street			
Griffith	Street			
Herbert	Street			
Herbert St East	Street			
148	Highway			
17	Highway			
41	Highway			
Hillside	Avenue			
Hincks	Street		Sir Francis Hincks (1807–1885)	Governor of Barbados and the British Windward Islands; Co-Premier of the Province of Canada (1851–1854); Member of the Legislative Assembly of the Province of Canada; Canada West Renfrew (1841–1844); Renfrew County, Canada West (1854–1855); Member of the House of Commons of Canada Renfrew North (1869–1872)
Horace	Street	c.1880s?	Horace James Church (1823-1894)	By at least 1851, Horace James Church (1823-1894) operated a water-powered sawmill, carding mill, and fulling mill on the Indian River near what are now Murray and McKee Streets (Concession I, Lot 15, Pembroke Township)^{1851 United Kingdom census?}. The property was later subdivided by his son, Horace Church (d. 1947), who laid out several streets in the area, including Horace Street, named in honour of his father.
Howard	Street			
Howe	Street			
Hunter	Street			
Indian	Lane			
International	Drive			
Irving	Street		Andrew Irving	Early school educator, in Upper Town, c. 1845
Isabella	Street		TBC - Isabella Moffat	Daughter of Alexander Moffat, early settler of Pembroke.
James	Street	c. 1860s	James Miller	Merchant??
John	Street		John Supple	John Supple, early settler who arrived in 1844. John St is located on land that was owned by Supple.
Joseph	Street		Joseph Supple	Son of John Supple, early settler of Pembroke that owned land where Joseph St is.
Jule	Street			
Julien	Street			
Julien St West	Street			
Koss	Lane			
Kyle	Avenue			
Lair	Street			
Lake	Street			
Laurier	Avenue			
Lea	Street			
Leahey	Street			
Lourdesview	Drive		Our Lady of Lourdes	Our Lady of Lourdes being one of the devotional names or titles under which the Catholic Church venerates the Virgin Mary.
Lynn	Street			
MacKay	Street	c. 1831	“A man named MacKay”	Name of family that owned land in the early days.
Maiden	Lane			
Maple	Avenue			
Maple Ave North	Avenue			
Margaret	Street		TBC - Margaret Moffat	Wife of Alexander Moffat, early settler of Pembroke.
Market	Street			
Mary	Street		Mary Church?	Daughter of Horace James Church(1823-1894). Because Mary Street only went along this concession I think.
Matheson	Drive			
McAllister Street	Street			
McGee	Street			
Mcgee St East	Street			
McKenzie	Street			
Melton	Street			
Metcalfe	Street		John Metcalfe	
Miller	Street	c. 1860s	James Miller	Merchant??
Moffat	Street		Alexander Moffat	Moffat established a homestead on the west bank of the Muskrat River
Moffat St South	Street			
Morris	Street			
Moss	Gardens			
Mud Lake	Road			
Munro	Street		J.W. Munroe	Responsible for CPR stone bridges from Montreal, QC & White River, ON. Built his home in Pembroke.
Murphy	Street			Name of family that owned land in the early days.
Nancy	Street			
Nelson	Street	Follow-Up	Horatio Nelson, 1st Viscount Nelson	Peter White founded the settlement, arriving in 1828 after service with Nelson in the Baltic and Sir James Yeo's squadron on L. Ontario during the War of 1812.
New	Street			
Noik	Drive			"Noik" is a rare, likely alternative spelling or surname, but it is often confused with the common noun nook, which refers to a small, secluded, sheltered, or corner space.
Norman	Street	c.1880s?	Norman Church	Brother of Horace Church.
Norman	Street			
O'Brien	Street			
O'Brien St North	Street			
Olympic	Drive			
Owens	Street			
Park	Avenue			
Patricia	Avenue			
Patterson	Street	c1920s	Sgt Edwin Patterson (1895-19?)	Local soldier in the Canadian Expeditionary Force, who died during the Battle of Vimy Ridge, during WWI.
Paul Martin	Drive		Paul Martin Sr.	A Canadian lawyer, politician and diplomat who was raised in Pembroke. He was the father of Paul Martin, who served as 21st prime minister of Canada from 2003 to 2006.
Pembroke St East	Street			
Pembroke St West	Street			
Perreault	Street			
Perth	Street		Perth, ON?	
Peter	Street		Peter Marion or Peter White?	Settler of Pembroke in 1828.
Peter St South	Street			
Poirier St	Street			
Poplar Ridge	Road			
Prince	Street			
Quarry	Road		The Pembroke quarry	Locally old famous “swimming hole” that is no longer open to the public.
Ramsey	Street			
Rankin	Street		John Rankin (1820-1900)	Hotelier, merchant and political figure. Member of the Canadian Parliament for Renfrew North (1867–1869). Warden of Renfrew County from 1865 to 1866.
Renfrew	Street		County of Renfrew	
Reta	Crescent			
Reynolds	Street			
River	Street			
Riverside	Drive			Formerly Pump House Dr.
Rosewood	Avenue			
Rowan	Street			
Sawmill	Road			
Second	Avenue			
Second Ave South	Avenue			
Shea	Avenue			
Somerset	Street			
Springfield	Crescent			
SS Pontiac Ferry	Street		SS Pontiac Ferry, in operation 1943-1956, sailing from Pembroke, over to L’Isle-aux- Allumettes, and up to DesJardinsville on the Ottawa River.	The last ferry to travel across the Ottawa River prior to the first bridge connecting the two provinces together.
St Anne	Crescent			
Steel	Street		Steel factory	
Stuart	Street			
Supple	Street	C. 1844	John Supply (c. 1810 – 1869)	Early settler family, arriving in 1844 from Ireland. Supple was a lumber merchant in the Pembroke area and a director of the Upper Ottawa Steamboat Company.
Sussex	Street		Prince Augustus Frederick, Duke of Sussex (1773–1843)	Son of King George III, and an early abolitionist.[
Sweezey	Court			
Sydenham	Street	c. 2000s	A previous name for the early community of Pembroke, where the Muskrat River meets the Ottawa River.	Named after the first Canadian Governor General of the United Province of Canada in 1841, Baron Sydenham, of Sydenham, in the county of Kent, and of Toronto, in Canada.
Third	Avenue			
Thompson	Street			
Townline	Road			
Trafalgar Road	Road		Cape Trafalgar, Spain	
Upper Valley	Drive		Upper Ottawa Valley	Colloquially name of the area
Victoria	Street	c. 1858	Queen Victoria of the United Kingdom of Great Britain and Ireland	Reigning queen of Canada when Pembroke was incorporated.
Villa	Street			
Wallace	Street			
Water	Street			
Welland	Street			
Weston	Street			
Wilbert	Street			
Wilfred	Street			
Willard	Street			
William	Street		William H. Supple	Son of John Supple, early settler of Pembroke that owned land where William St is located.
Willoughby	Drive			
Wilson	Place			
Woodcrest	Drive			

== Retired street names ==
	Old street name	Current street name	Effective	Notes
	Berlin Street	Isabella Street	c. 1871	
Map of 1853 shows Elgin St. when was it changed to Prince St.	Elgin Street	Prince Street	c. 1871	Likely named after Lord Elgin (1811-1863), Governor General of the Province of Canada (1847–1854). Prince of Wales (later Edward VII)

== Planned street names ==
Old street name	Since	Significance and Notes
King Street	c. 1871	
Queen Street	c. 1871	

== Attractions ==
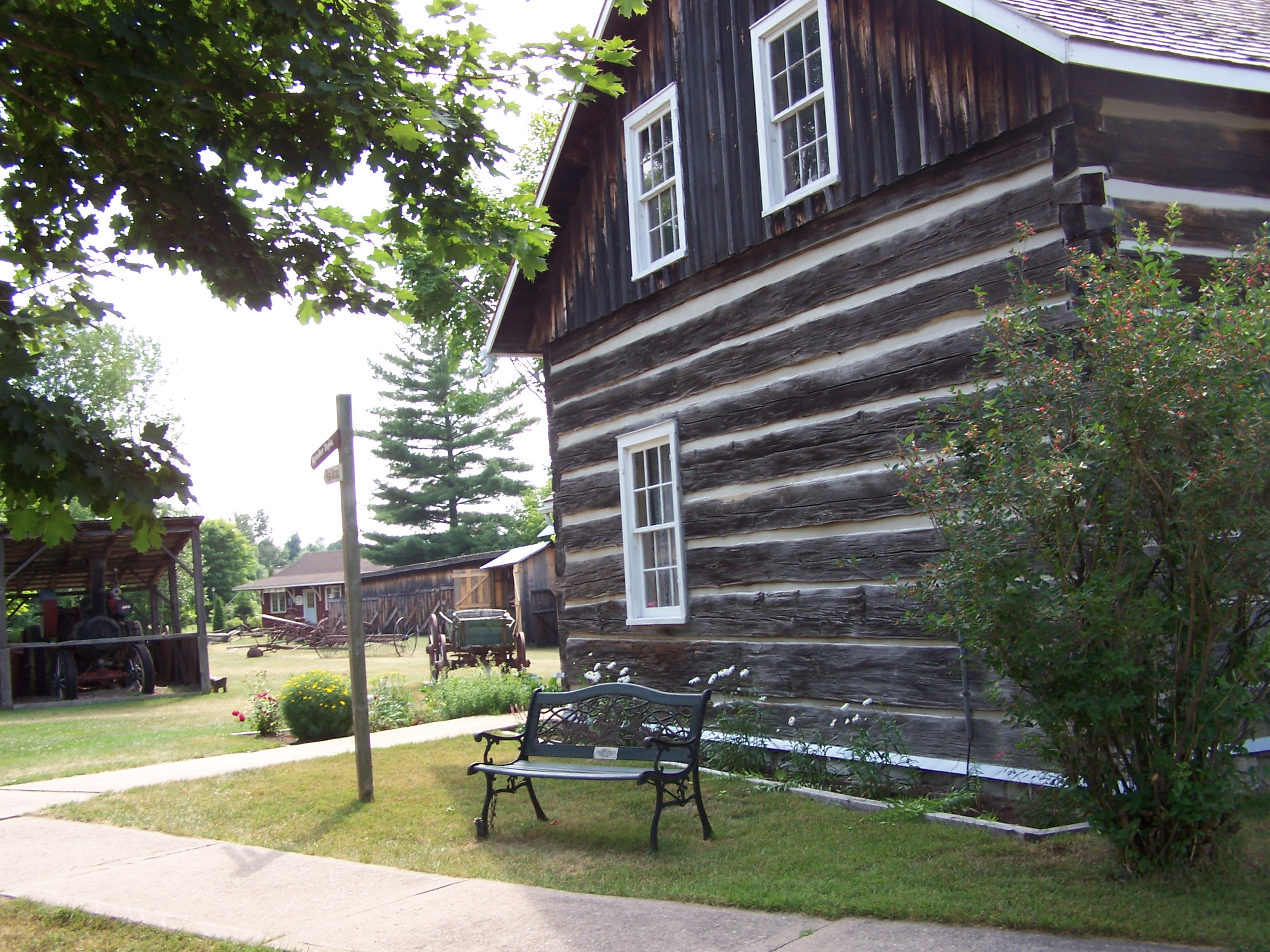
Historic log buildings at the Upper Ottawa Valley Heritage Centre (formerly Champlain Trail Pioneer Village),

Local attractions include 30 historic murals in the downtown area depicting the history of the city, from steam engines to logging.

At the Upper Ottawa Valley Heritage Centre (previously Champlain Trail Museum and Pioneer Village), the history of Ottawa Valley settlers comes alive inside the fully furnished schoolhouse, pioneer log home and church, all built in the 1800s. Other outdoor exhibits include a train station, sawmill, blacksmith shop, stonelifter, carriage shed, woodworking shop, bake oven, smokehouse and 1923 Bickle fire engine. The large museum features artifacts which range from fossils and indigenous arrowheads to furniture, clothing and manufactured products of Pembroke from various eras. There is also a replica of Samuel de Champlain's Astrolabe (he brought the original to the Valley in 1613), an original Cockburn pointer boat, Corliss steam engine, doctor's examination room, fancy parlour rooms, general store, hair salon and more.

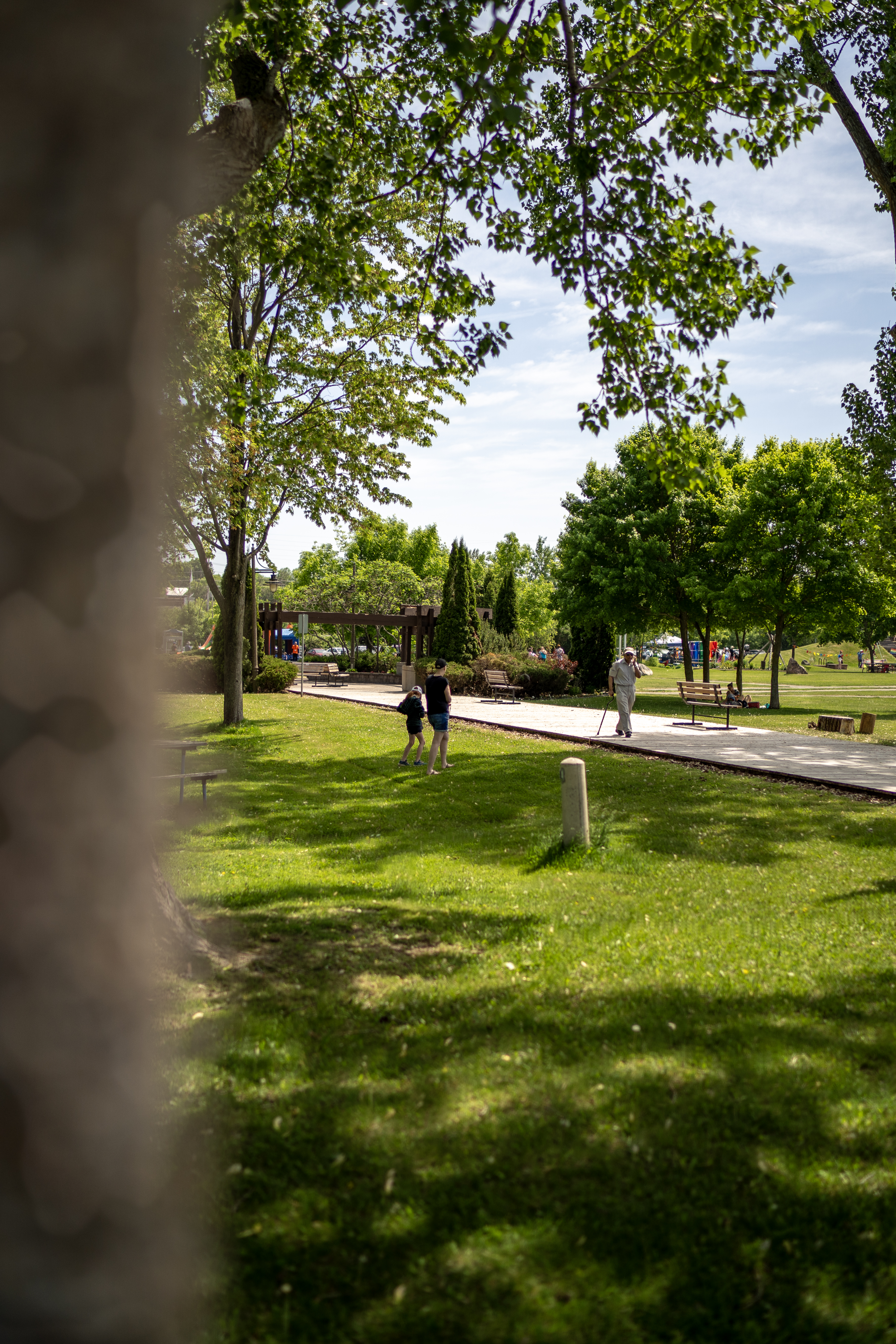
Pedestrian boardwalk and green space at Pembroke Waterfront Park, facing away from the Ottawa River.

The Pembroke Hydro Museum commemorates national hydro-electric development in Pembroke, including the first electric streetlights in Pembroke, and the first municipal building with electric lights (Victoria Hall).

The city is home to an annual Old Time Fiddling and Step Dancing Festival, which happens Labour Day weekend at Riverside Park. There are often up to 1,400 RVs parked there for the week preceding the event. Award-winning fiddler/step dancer April Verch is a Pembroke native.

Pembroke has a 600 plus seat community arts facility, Festival Hall Centre of the Arts. The facility is operated by a Consortium consisting of The City of Pembroke and the Townships of Petawawa and Laurentian Valley. This facility hosts various local productions and top Canadian artists during the year.

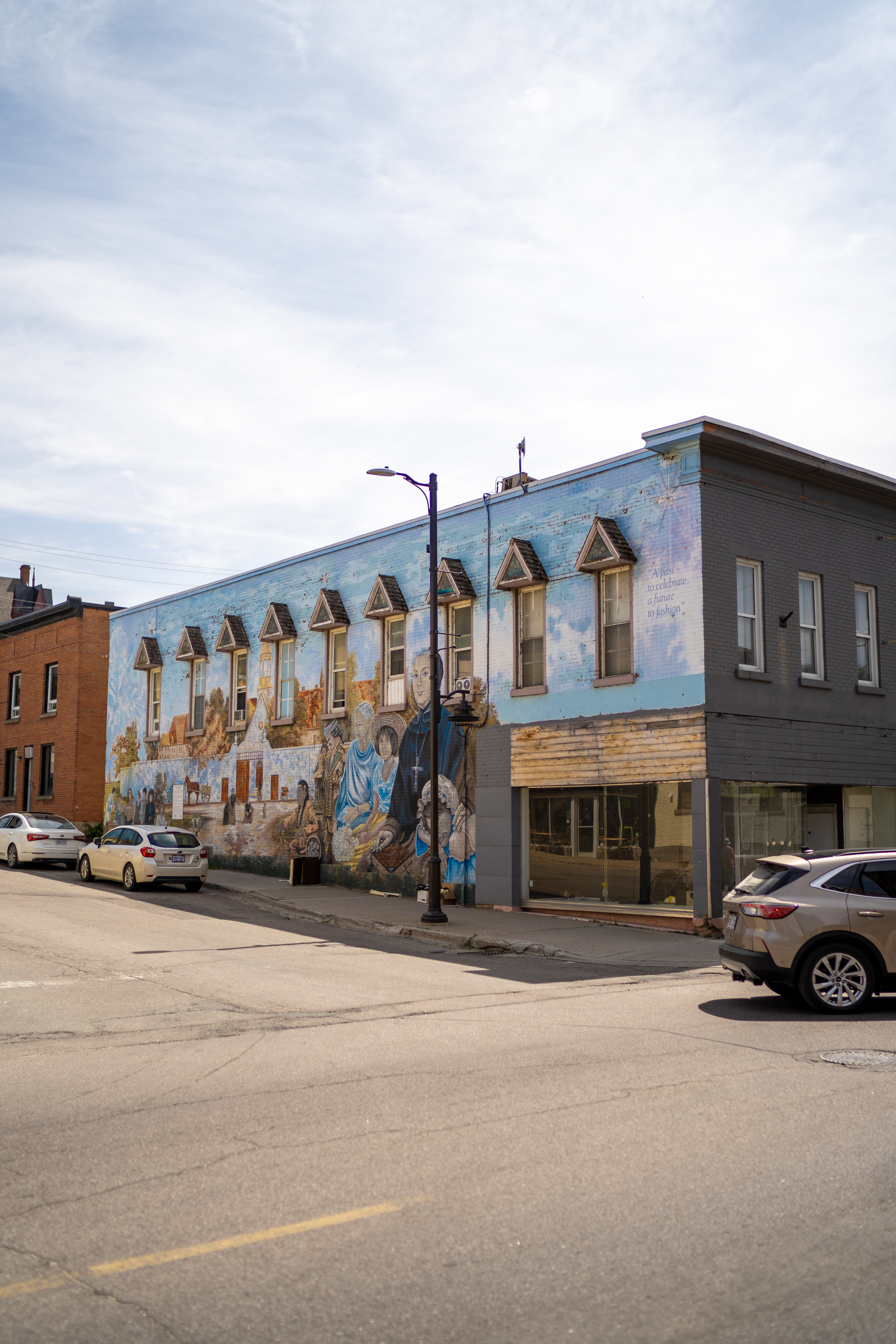
Street art in Pembroke.

Pembroke also is host to the annual Silver Stick Regional Minor League Hockey Tournament, which brings in several hundred children and youth on weekends in November and early December for regional qualifying games.

Pembroke's Public Library was designed by architect Francis Conroy Sullivan, a contemporary of Frank Lloyd Wright.

== Sports ==
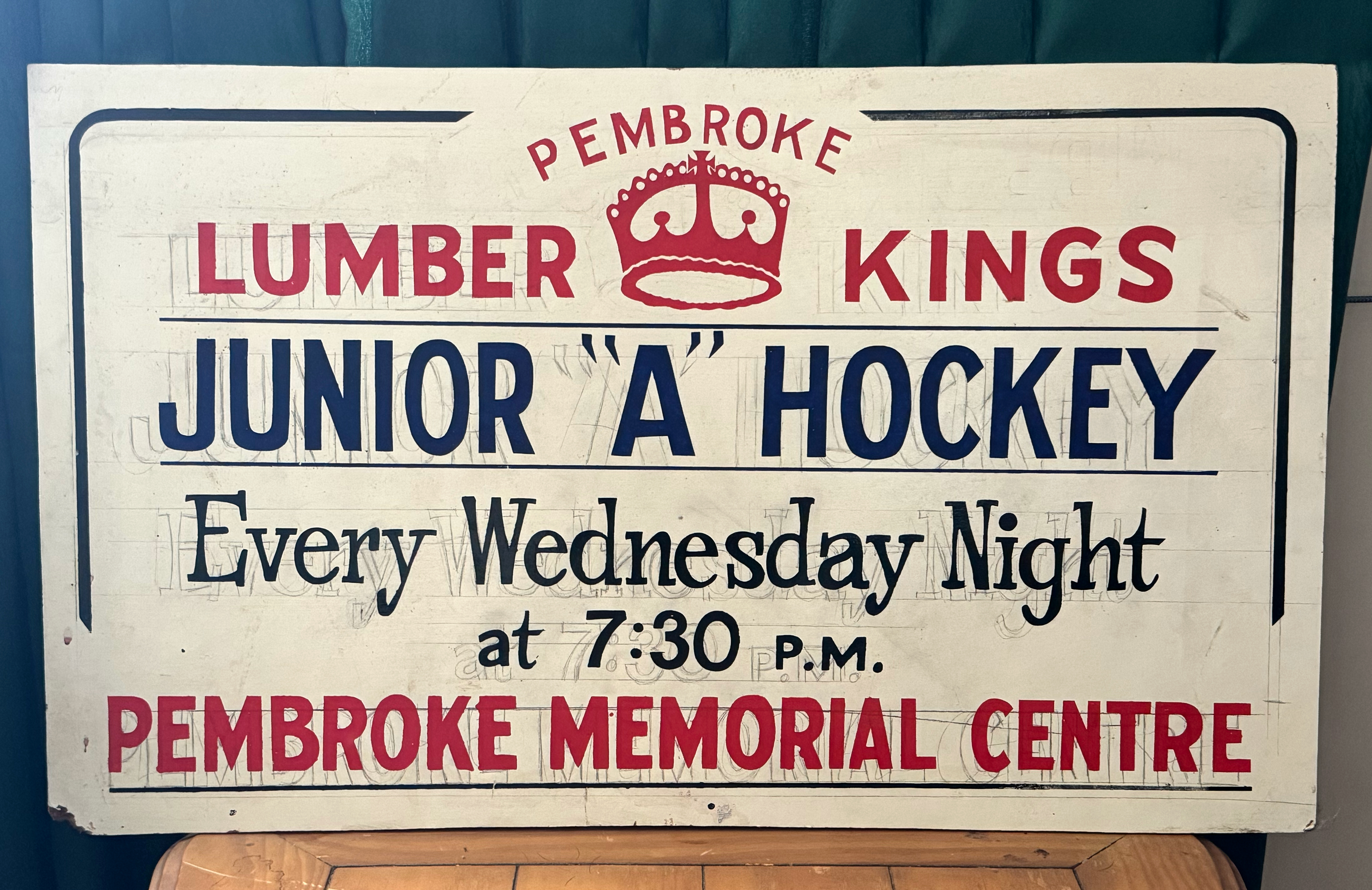

=== Pembroke Lumber Kings ===
Pembroke has been the home of the Pembroke Lumber Kings Junior A Hockey Club since 1958. They have been members of the Central Canada Hockey League since 1964, with the exception of the 1979–1980 season when the Pembroke Royals replaced them. Pembroke has won the CCHL Championship a record five consecutive years. In 2011, they won their first Canadian Junior A title, the Royal Bank Cup.

=== Terry O'Neill Pembroke Regional Silver Stick Tournament ===
The Terry O'Neill Pembroke Regional Silver Stick Tournament is a major youth hockey event held annually in Pembroke, Ontario, serving as a qualifier for the International Silver Stick Finals in Port Huron, Michigan, with teams competing across various age divisions (U11, U13, U18) for regional titles. Named after beloved community figure Terry O'Neill, it draws teams from across Ontario to venues like the Pembroke Memorial Centre (PMC) and PACC, bringing significant economic benefits and fostering local hockey pride, with recent tournaments happening in November.

== Education ==
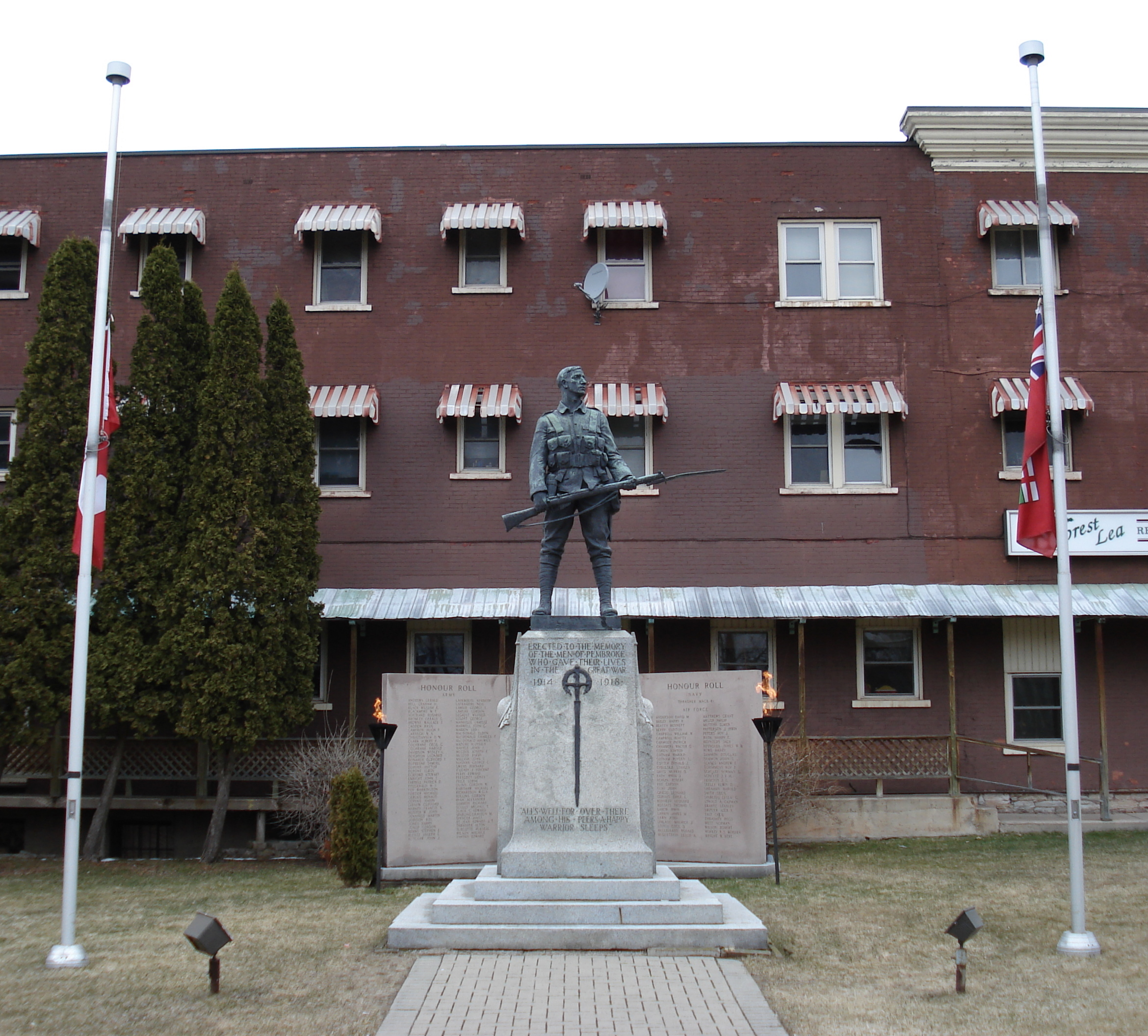
The war memorial in downtown Pembroke.

The City of Pembroke has eight English-Language school institutions:

Renfrew County District School Board

- Highview Public School
- Rockwood Public School
- Champlain Discovery Public School
- Fellowes High School

Renfrew County Catholic District School Board

- Cathedral Catholic School
- Holy Name Catholic School
- Our Lady of Lourdes Catholic School
- Bishop Smith Catholic High School

There are two French-language school institutions serving the city:

- École élémentaire et secondaire publique l’Équinoxe is a smaller French-language public school offering both elementary and secondary education.
- École élémentaire et secondaire catholique Jeanne-Lajoie is the French-language Catholic school, operating as a single institution with elementary and secondary campuses.

All secondary schools in Pembroke participate in the Upper Ottawa Valley High School Athletic Association (UOVHSAA). The association includes 11 high schools in Renfrew County and operates as part of the Eastern Ontario Secondary Schools Athletic Association (EOSSAA), which in turn is affiliated with the Ontario Federation of School Athletic Associations (OFSAA).

Through UOVHSAA competition, Pembroke students are eligible to participate in a range of interscholastic sports, including rugby, volleyball, cross-country running, football, basketball, alpine and Nordic skiing, hockey, snowboarding, curling, wrestling, badminton, golf, soccer, tennis, and track and field, with opportunities to advance to regional and provincial levels of competition.

Algonquin College operates a campus in downtown Pembroke near the Ottawa River. While offering a selection of programs also available at its Ottawa campus, the Pembroke campus specializes in applied and outdoor-focused programs, including Outdoor Adventure, Outdoor Adventure Naturalist, Forestry Technician, and Environmental Technician. These programs reflect the campus’s location in the Upper Ottawa Valley and its proximity to Algonquin Provincial Park.

== Healthcare services ==
Pembroke Regional Hospital is the city’s sole hospital and provides acute-care services to Pembroke and the surrounding region. The hospital offers inpatient and outpatient care, including medical and surgical services, maternal and child care, mental health services, regional rehabilitation, emergency care, and intensive care. It is affiliated with the University of Ottawa Faculty of Medicine and functions as a teaching hospital. In addition to hospital-based care, a number of physicians practise independently within the community.

Community-based health services are also available through organizations such as the Integrated Health Centre, which provides multidisciplinary and preventive health services.

Mental health care in Pembroke is delivered through hospital-based and community-based providers. Mental Health Services of Renfrew County operates inpatient and outpatient mental health programs at Pembroke Regional Hospital.

Youth mental health services are provided by the Phoenix Centre for Children and Families, a provincially funded organization that has now amalgamated with the Pembroke Regional Hospital. Additional counselling and support services are offered by the Robbie Dean Family Counselling Centre, which provides programs for crisis intervention, trauma-related support, youth and family counselling, and peer-support initiatives.

== Media ==
Most broadcast media available in Pembroke consist of rebroadcasters of stations originating from Ottawa, Arnprior, Toronto, or neighbouring communities in Quebec. CHVR-FM is the only radio station directly based in Pembroke. The city is also the official city of license for CHRO-TV, although the station operates from studios in Ottawa.

=== Radio ===
Frequency	Call sign	Branding	Format	Owner	Notes
FM 88.7	CBOF-FM-9	Ici Radio-Canada Première	news/talk	Canadian Broadcasting Corporation	French Rebroadcaster of CBOF-FM Ottawa
FM 92.5	CBCD-FM	CBC Radio One	Talk radio, public radio	Canadian Broadcasting Corporation	Rebroadcaster of CBO-FM Ottawa
FM 96.7	CHVR-FM	Pure Country 96.7	Country music	Bell Media	
FM 99.9	CKQB-FM-1	Jump! 106.9	contemporary hit radio	Corus Entertainment	Rebroadcaster of CKQB-FM Ottawa
FM 100.7	CHRI-FM-2	CHRI Family Radio	Christian	Christian Hit Radio Inc.	Rebroadcaster of CHRI-FM Ottawa
FM 101.9	CHIP-FM	CHIP 101.9	Community radio	La Radio du Pontiac Inc.	Broadcasts from Fort Coulonge, Quebec
FM 104.9	CIMY-FM	myFM	adult contemporary	My Broadcasting Corporation	

=== Other FM Stations ===
- 106.7 FM - Skylight Drive-in Theatre, a seasonal very low-power FM signal heard in car radios at the drive-in.

=== Television ===
Television services in Pembroke are primarily provided through rebroadcast transmitters and cable distribution, including Cogeco Cable.

OTA channel	Call sign	Network	Notes
5	CHRO-TV	CTV Two	
23	CIVP-DT	Télé-Québec	(from Chapeau, Quebec; rebroadcasts CIVM-DT, Montreal)
47	CJOH-TV-47	CTV	(analogue rebroadcaster of CJOH-DT Ottawa)

- YourTV (Cogeco) Ottawa Valley. Community programming channel operated by Cogeco, available on local channel 12 in Pembroke.

==== Defunct stations ====
Former over-the-air television stations:

OTA channel	Call sign	Network	Notes
3	CBOT-TV-6	CBC Television	Deep River/Pembroke
11	CBOFT-TV-1	Ici Radio-Canada Télé	(from Chapeau, Quebec; rebroadcasts CBOFT-DT, Ottawa)
17	CHLF-TV-13	Télévision française de l'Ontario (TFO)	
29	CICE-TV-16	TVOntario (TVO)	

=== Print ===
The city’s primary local newspaper is The Pembroke Observer, which is published in print and online. While historically printed in Pembroke, production is no longer based in the city.

== Notable people ==
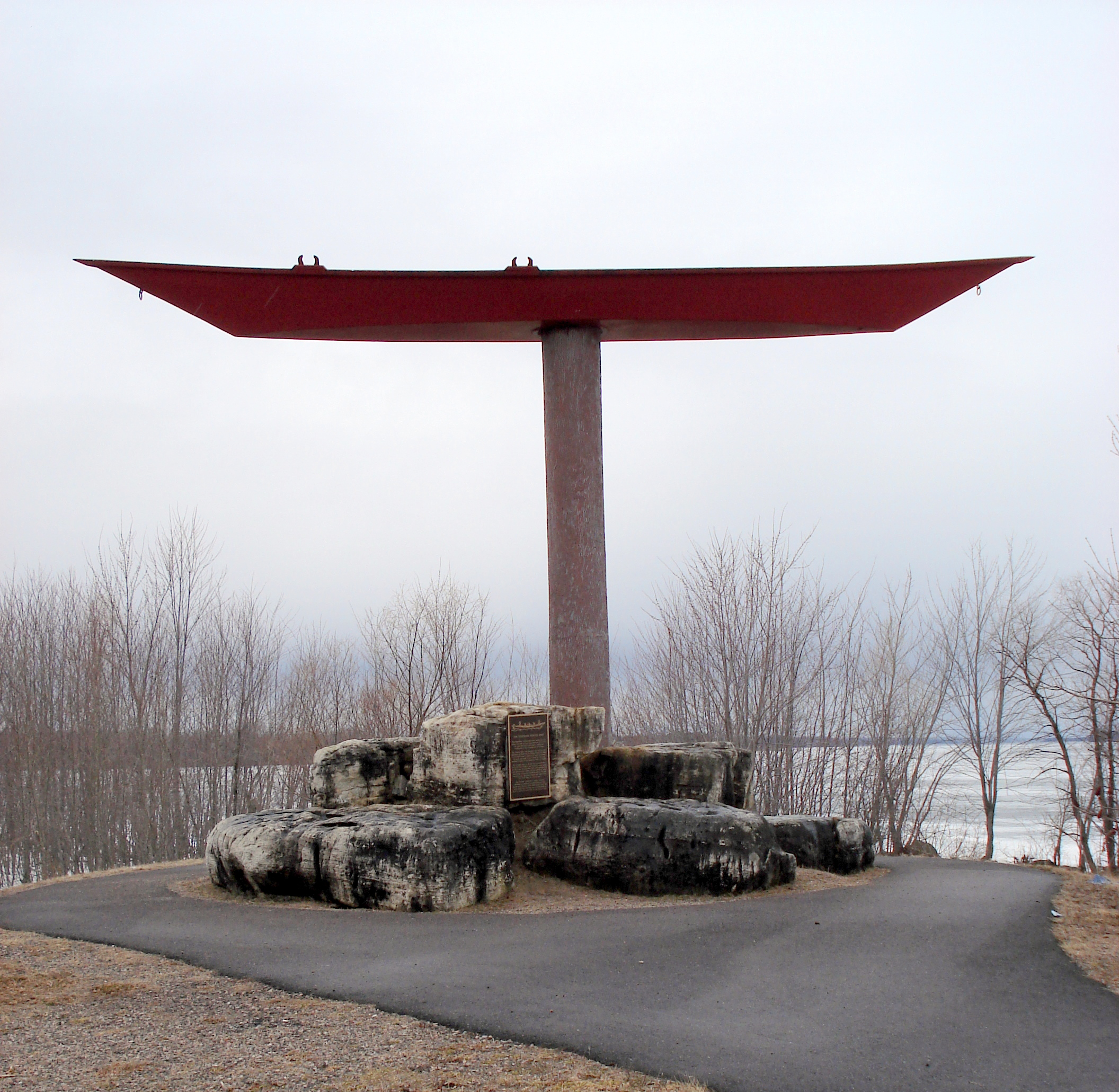
A monument to the pointer boat, part of the historically important logging industry, near the Pembroke Marina

- Andy Knight, Award-winning film director, animator and founder of Red Rover Studios
- Ken Babstock, Award‑winning poet (Trillium Book Award, Griffin finalist). Born in Newfoundland, he grew up in Pembroke, where he first began writing poetry
- Tom Green, Canadian comedian, and musician/songwriter.
- Joshua Bartholomew, Singer‑songwriter and producer who co‑wrote and performed the hit song “Everything Is Awesome” from The Lego Movie. He was born in Pembroke and later raised on military bases.
- Jason Blaine, country music artist. Although based in Nashville, Tennessee, he notes that he grew up in Pembroke and began performing locally before his career took off.
- Sarah Boudens, Sprint canoe and kayak athlete who represented Canada internationally.
- Harry Cameron, Hockey Hall of Fame defenceman for early NHL clubs.
- Hec Clouthier, Retired federal politician who represented Renfrew-Nipissing-Pembroke. In office 2 June 1997 – 27 November 2000. He is known for wearing a fedora and his election slogan, "Give 'em Hec".
- Bruce Cockburn, Folk‑rock singer‑songwriter and activist. He spent part of his childhood on a farm near Pembroke before moving back to Ottawa.
- Sean Conway, Long‑time Liberal MPP for Renfrew–Nipissing–Pembroke; born in Pembroke.
- Dee Brasseur – One of Canada’s first female CF‑18 pilots and a retired lieutenant‑colonel. Born in Pembroke in 1953.
- William Arthur Deacon, Literary critic and editor for The Globe and Mail.
- Edward Arunah Dunlop – Soldier, public servant and politician; lost his right hand in a training accident and was awarded the George Medal. Born and educated in Pembroke
- Randy Holt, NHL defenceman (Chicago Blackhawks, Washington Capitals) born in Pembroke on Jan. 15 1953
- Wendy Jocko, former chief of the Algonquins of Pikwakanagan First Nation
- Hugh Lehman, hockey player
- Robert James Manion, Canadian politician who led the Conservative Party of Canada from 1938 to 1940.
- Paul Martin Sr., Canadian lawyer, politician and diplomat. He was the father of Paul Martin, who served as 21st prime minister of Canada from 2003 to 2006.
- Carol Anne Meehan, former Ottawa City Councillor and former news anchor at CJOH-DT.
- Richard John Neuhaus, writer and Christian cleric (first in the Lutheran Church – Missouri Synod, then the Evangelical Lutheran Church in America and later the Catholic Church)
- Frank Nighbor, hockey player (forward) who played primarily for the Ottawa Senators of the National Hockey Association (NHA) and National Hockey League (NHL)
- Dan O'Connor, politician and prospector
- Wayne Rostad, singer-songwriter
- Patrick Thomas Stone, lawyer, United States district judge of the United States District Court for the Western District of Wisconsin
- Bob Stutt, puppeteer The Big Comfy Couch
- Peter Togni, composer
- Peter White, Jr., lumber merchant and politician; born in Pembroke on 30 August 1838 and later served as Speaker of the House of Commons (Canada).
- Jolan Wong, sitting volleyball player
- Jordon Zadorozny, singer-songwriter

== See also ==
- Pembroke Airport
- Kichesipirini
- List of francophone communities in Ontario
