= Villa Française des Jeunes =

Location
- 11 Edinburgh Avenue; Elliot Lake, Ontario, P5A 2M3; Canada; 46°22′42″N 82°39′52″W

Information
- School type: Public, middle school and high school
- Motto: "Fait ce que dois" (Do what is right)
- Founded: 1977
- School board: Conseil scolaire de district du Grand Nord de l'Ontario
- Area trustee: Suzanne Nolin
- School number: 164925 (middle school), 965570 (high school)
- Administrator: Aline Bédard
- Principal: Christian Giroux
- Grades: 7–12
- Language: French
- Colours: Orange, black, white
- Mascot: Pingo the Penguin
- Team name: Élite
- Website: esvfj.cspgno.ca

Villa Francaise des Jeunes (VFJ) is a French-language middle school and high school located in Elliot Lake, Ontario, Canada. The school shares a track field with the neighbouring Elliot Lake Secondary School (ELSS). Founded in 1977, the institution has seen a drastic drop in enrolment for many years, which has seen some students participating in video-conferencing classes with many other students from all over Northern Ontario. The enrolment as of September 2009 was 16 (middle school) and 45 (high school).

== See also ==
- Education in Ontario
- List of secondary schools in Ontario
