= Wendy Jocko =

Wendy Jocko (born 1959/1960) is a former chief of the Algonquins of Pikwakanagan First Nation, and a former sergeant of the Canadian Armed Forces.

== Early life ==
Jocko was born in Pembroke, Ontario. to a military family. Her great-grandfather and his sons fought in the War of 1812. Her uncles served in World War I, while her father served in World War II. While in Europe, her father met Jocko's mother, who was a Scottish soldier. While living in Petawawa, at age 4, Jocko decided she wanted to be a soldier.

At age 15, Jocko began working for the post office as a sorter for mail and packages.

== Career ==
In 1979, at age 19, Jocko joined the Canadian Armed Forces, where she served for 23 years. She trained at Canadian Forces Recruit School Cornwallis before being posted to CFB Edmonton as a supply technician. She was posted to Calgary in 1986, becoming one of the first women to serve at her base. She served two tours in Bosnia and Croatia in 1993 and 1998, where she worked as a United Nations peacekeeper. Her final deployment was in Haiti.

After leaving the military in 2002, Jocko moved to Scotland, where she worked as a funeral director and embalmer. She eventually became a regional director of the British Institute of Funeral Directors.

In 2013, Jocko returned to Canada. She worked in Saskatchewan as a tractor truck driver. In 2015, she reconnected with the Algonquins of Pikwakanagan First Nation.

She was elected chief of the Algonquins of Pikwakanagan First Nation in 2020, and helped guide the community through the initial stages of the COVID-19 pandemic. She was defeated in the 2023 tribal elections by Greg Sarazin. In 2024, she joined the board of directors at TriCycle Data Systems.

== Personal life ==
Jocko has four children; her son, James McMullin, served with 1st Battalion, The Royal Canadian Regiment (1RCR).

In 2023, Jocko was awarded an honorary degree from Algonquin College. That same year, Elaine Goble painted a portrait of her as part of a series on Indigenous military veterans.
