= Pointer boat =

Logging boat

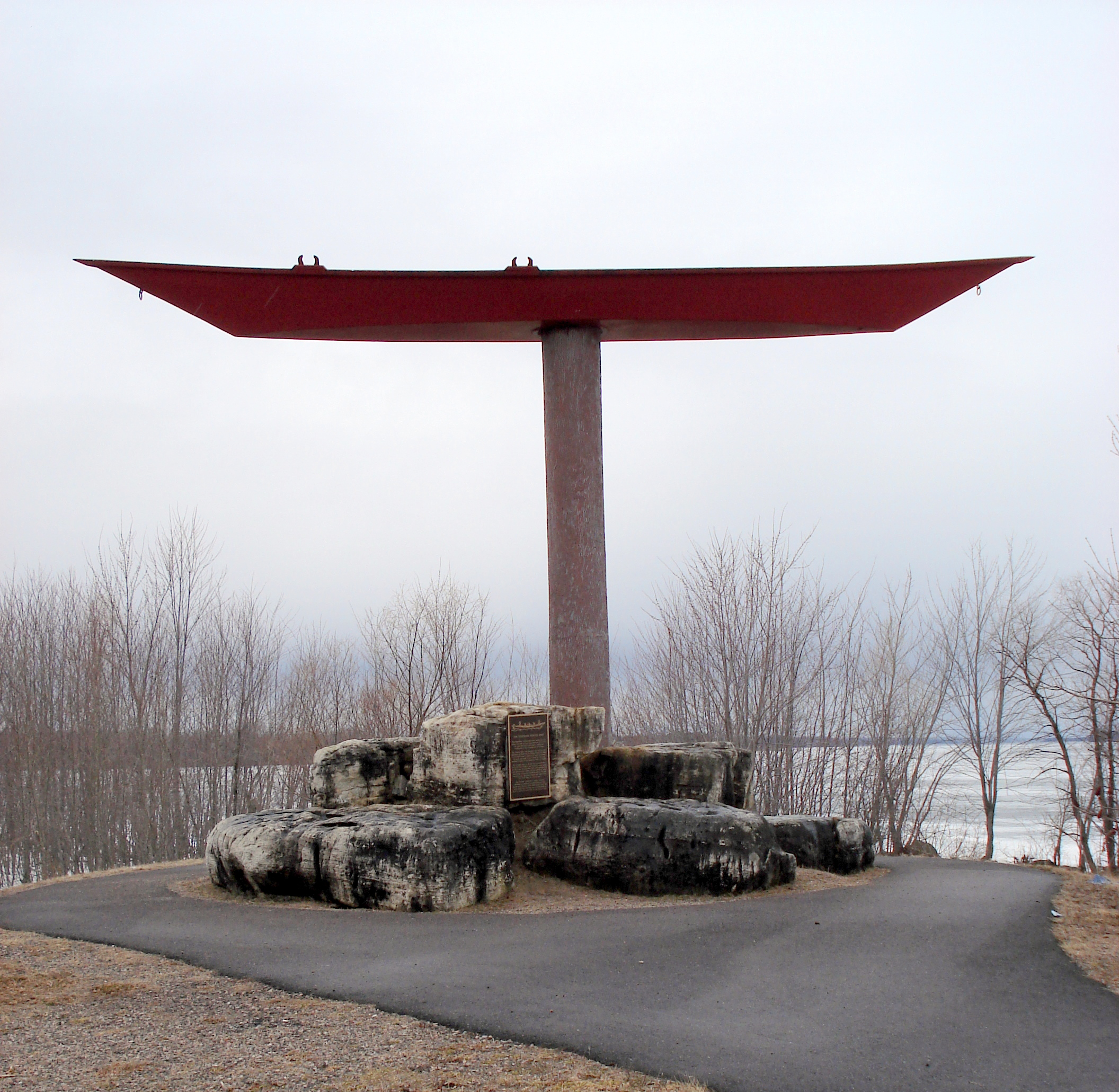
A monument to the pointer boat in the Pembroke marina

Pointer boats were designed by John Cockburn and built by John, his son and grandson, from the 1850s to 1969 at their boatworks in Ottawa and later at Pembroke, Ontario, Canada. They were wooden, oared boats used for transportation along rivers such as the Ottawa River.

== Utility ==
This historical boat was used in logging and had a very influential impact on the industry. The boat was the "workhorse" of the Canadian river system and was famous for being able to "float on a heavy dew". They assisted loggers to move Eastern White Pine timber down the wider sections of the Ottawa River.

== Design ==
Pointer boats were unique. Not only were they as sturdy as the East Coast fishing dory, but they could carry eight men while floating in only five inches of water. Empty, a pointer with a dead weight of half a ton or more drew only one and a half inches of water. Even though the boats ranged in length from 22–50 feet, to turn one end-for-end needed only one pull on an oar. Because the boat was double-ended (identical bow and stern), workers could focus on the task at hand rather than on which way the boat was facing.

== History ==
John Cockburn began his boat-building business in Ottawa, Ontario, Canada, after being commissioned by John R. Booth to build a sturdy boat for logging. In 1859 he moved his business to Pembroke, Ontario. Up to then, the finished boats were being shipped the 145 miles to Pembroke by horse and sleigh. The Cockburns fashioned their boats to last at least ten seasons in normal use. However, due to rough water and rocks some did not last a single season. In peak years, the Cockburn family produced two hundred pointers.

For more than one hundred years the Cockburns used the same materials and made relatively few changes to the design. The boats were planked in local red or white pine. White Cedar from Allumette Island in the upper Ottawa River had bent roots suitable for making into ribs. Red Pine or White Spruce was fashioned into oars while the paddles were made from Yellow Birch, or White Oak. Beside Cockburn's shop was a building in which wood was air-dried for twelve months before use.

Construction began with a plywood template and laying out the bottom side planks. Then, the stern and bow posts were temporarily attached. The centre width of the boat was then blocked in. Binding ropes and stays were applied and tightened into the final shape of the boat. After this, each tongue and groove siding plank would carefully be selected at equal length and nailed in. The process of slackening, tightening the rope and adding siding planks was repeated until the boat was of proper size. Working from the center of the boat to the stern and bow, the cross frames and supporting ribs were installed. Finally, the V-bottom shape was precisely crafted to achieve a shallow draft. The end product was then treated with a preservative made from boiled (linseed?) oil and jewelers rouge, which gave them a red Venetian appearance.

John Cockburn's business spanned three generations to his son Albert, and then, to grandson Jack. Jack Cockburn continued to produce Pointer Boats in 1969 before he died in 1972. Although the boats were designed for logging they have been used in other industries such as mining, power and construction industries for getting to remote terrain. In recognition to the Cockburn family and the historical impact the Pointer Boat had on the logging industry, a 32-foot steel replica of the Pointer boat was built in Pembroke. Today this replica is known as one of the "Large Canadian Roadside Attractions"
