= ACÉPO =

Canadian educational organization

The Association des conseils scolaires des écoles publiques de l'Ontario (Ontario French-language Public School Boards' Association in English), or ACÉPO, is an educational organization with its headquarters on University Avenue, in Toronto, Ontario, Canada. ACÉPO is an organization that represents the four public secular French first language school boards of Ontario.

French language education for Francophones in Ontario is a constitutional right guaranteed by Section 23 of the Canadian Charter of Rights and Freedoms. Non-Francophone residents of Ontario may also register their children in French Schools by applying through an admission committee.

== Members ==
School boards that are members of ACÉPO include:

- Conseil des écoles publiques de l'Est de l'Ontario (CÉPEO), with schools situated in Eastern Ontario, and portions of Central Ontario.
- Conseil scolaire de district du Grand Nord de l'Ontario (CSDGNO), with schools situated in Northwestern Ontario, and portions of Northeastern Ontario.
- Conseil scolaire de district du Nord-Est de l'Ontario (CSPNE), with schools situated in portions of Northeastern Ontario.
- Conseil scolaire Viamonde (CSV), with schools situated in the Greater Golden Horseshoe and Southwestern Ontario.

== History ==
It changed its name in 2006 from Association des conseillères et des conseillers des écoles publiques de l'Ontario (Ontario French-language school boards Trustees (in English)) to move from an individual membership to school board representation. In 2011, student registration in the provincial Public French-language schools has grown by 48% since its inception in 1998 and serves over 25% of French language elementary and secondary students in the province of Ontario.

== See also ==
- Education in Ontario
- List of Ontario school boards
