= École secondaire publique Odyssée =

Location
- 480 Norman Avenue; North Bay, Ontario, P1B 8B7; Canada; 46.3284°N 79.4385°W

Information
- School type: Public, high school
- School board: CSDNE
- School number: 909335
- Principal: Ashli Lewis
- Grades: 7-12
- Enrollment: 50 (2024)
- Language: French
- Colours: Blue, Silver and White
- Mascot: Phoenix
- Website: www.csdne.edu.on.ca/odyssee/

École secondaire publique Odyssée is a French-language intermediate and secondary school located in North Bay, Ontario and is part of the Conseil scolaire public du Nord-Est de l'Ontario. It opened in 2004. The elementary school École élémentaire publique Odyssée opened in 2005 and shares the same building as the secondary school.

== See also ==
- Education in Ontario
- List of secondary schools in Ontario
