= Pembroke City Council =

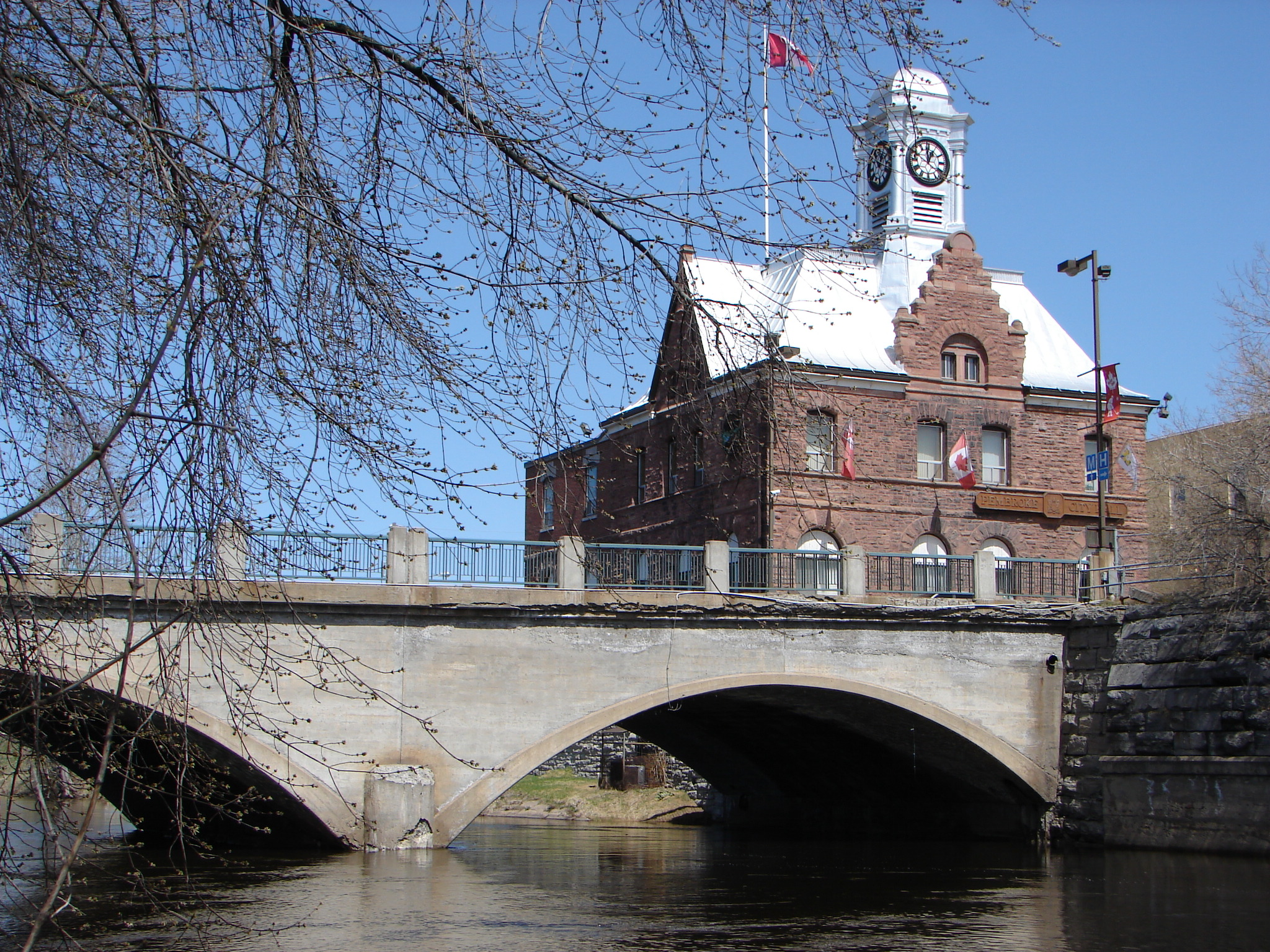
Pembroke City Hall, where council meets.

Pembroke City Council is the governing body of the Corporation of the City of Pembroke, Ontario, Canada. It is composed of five councillors, one mayor and one deputy mayor.

== Elections ==
Elections are held every four years, per the Ontario Municipal Elections Act. Councillors are elected by the electorate at large; that is, without geographic divisions. The mayor is also directly elected.

=== 2006 elections ===
Results from 2006 municipal elections:

Mayor

Candidate	Votes	Elected
Ed Jacyno	3,208	X
Bob Bimm	2,123	

Council

Candidate	Votes	Elected
Les Scott	3,130	X
Patricia Lafreniere	3,019	X
Dan Callaghan	2,946	X
Shirley White	2,734	X
Gary Severin	2,551	X
Terry O'Neill	2,527	X
Bob Hackett	2,364	X
Cheryl Lowe	2,229	X
Bill Higginson	2,190	
Terry Demers	2,186	
Irene Perrault	1,754	
Brad Barta	1,395	
Rick Macdonald	1,293	
Dean Fuisz	1,249	
Sandra Lubimiv	1,223	

== Budget ==
For the 2009 fiscal year, council approved a municipal budget of $29.3 million CA$. As of 2009, the Corporation's debtload is $15.95 million.
