= Conseil des écoles publiques de l'Est de l'Ontario =

School board in Ontario, Canada

Conseil des écoles publiques de l'Est de L'Ontario
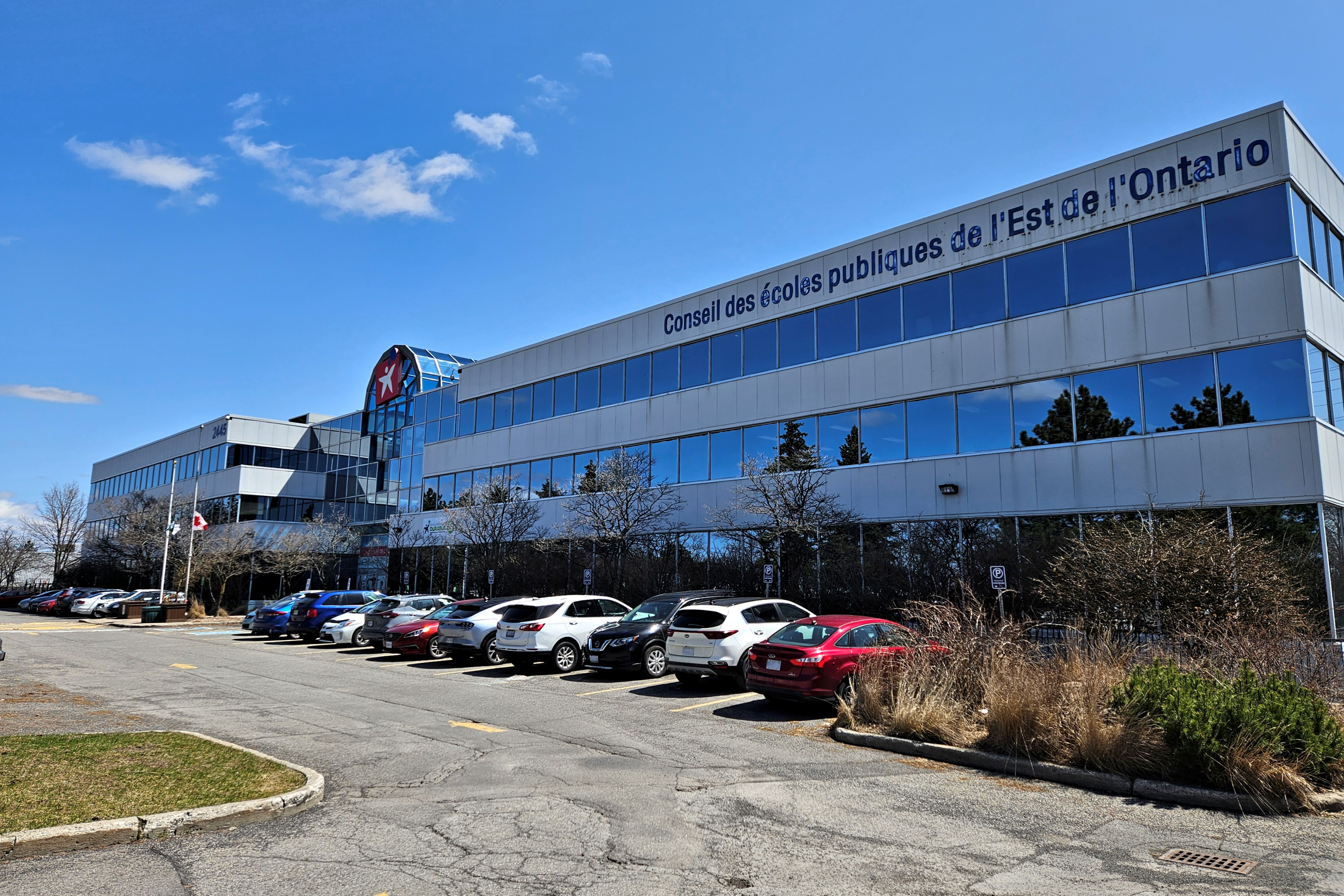
- CEPEO Headoffice in Ottawa

Location
- Ottawa, Ontario Ottawa, Prescott-Russell, Stormont, Dundas & Glengarry, Pembroke, Trenton and Kingston Canada

District information
- Chair of the board: Jacinthe Marcil
- Director of education: Christian-Charle Bouchard
- Schools: 47
- Budget: C$336.3 Million (2024-2025)

Students and staff
- Students: Over 18000
- Faculty: Over 5000

Other information
- Elected trustees: Ward 1: Colette Stitt; Ward 2: Rosine Umwali Twagirimana; Ward 3: Mathieu Tondreau; Ward 4: Gilles Fournier; Ward 5: Pierre Tessier; Ward 6: Marc Roy; Ward 7: Philippe Landry; Ward 8: Denis Labrèche; Ward 9: Joël Beddows; Ward 10: Sonia Boudreault; Ward 11: Jacinthe Marcil; Ward 12: Samia Ouled Ali
- Student trustees: Nour Harb; Hajer Belmebarki
- Website: www.cepeo.on.ca

The Conseil des écoles publiques de l'Est de l'Ontario, also widely known as CEPEO, is the public school board responsible for education in the French language in Eastern Ontario, including the Ottawa area. The board consists of 12 trustees elected every 4 years during municipal elections in Ontario and 2 student trustees elected every year. The area in which the board operates covers 40,314 km^{2} of Ontario. It employs more than 3000 employees, the majority being teachers.

Its headquarters are in Ottawa.

The board was created January 1, 1998, when the Government of Ontario decided to create 12 French school boards across Ontario. The CEPEO is a member of the Association des conseils des écoles publique de l'Ontario (ACÉPO).

Formerly, the Conseil des écoles publiques de l'Est de l'Ontario was officially known as the Conseil de district des écoles publiques de langue française no 59.

== Schools list ==
=== Elementary ===
- École élémentaire publique Carrefour Jeunesse (Rockland)
- École élémentaire publique Charlotte-Lemieux (Nepean, Ottawa)
- École élémentaire publique Cité-Jeunesse (Trenton)
- École élémentaire publique Francojeunesse (Ottawa)
- École élémentaire publique Gabrielle-Roy (Gloucester, Ottawa)
- École élémentaire publique Jeanne-Sauvé (Orléans, Ottawa)
- École élémentaire publique Grande-Ourse (Kanata) (formerly known as École élémentaire publique Julie-Payette)
- École élémentaire publique Madeleine-de-Roybon (Kingston)
- École élémentaire publique Mamawi (Nepean, Ottawa)
- École élémentaire publique Marie-Curie (Ottawa)
- École élémentaire publique Michaëlle-Jean (Barrhaven, Ottawa)
- École élémentaire publique Michel-Dupuis (Riverside South, Ottawa)
- École élémentaire publique Nouvel Horizon (Hawkesbury)
- École élémentaire publique l'Odyssée (Orléans, Ottawa)
- École élémentaire publique le Prélude (Orléans, Ottawa)
- École élémentaire publique de la Rivière-Castor (Embrun)
- École élémentaire publique Rose des Vents (Cornwall)
- École élémentaire publique des Sentiers (Orléans, Ottawa)
- École élémentaire publique Séraphin-Marion (Gloucester, Ottawa)
- École élémentaire publique le Trillium (Ottawa)

=== Intermediate/secondary ===
- École élémentaire et secondaire publique l'Académie de la Seigneurie (Casselman)
- École élémentaire et secondaire publique l'Équinoxe (Pembroke)
- École élémentaire et secondaire publique Maurice-Lapointe (Kanata, Ottawa)

=== Secondary ===
- Centre d'éducation et de formation de l'Est ontarien (Alexandria, Casselman, Cornwall, Hawkesbury, Rockland)
- École pour adulte le Carrefour (Ottawa)
- École secondaire publique l'Alternative (Ottawa)
- École secondaire publique Gisèle-Lalonde (Orléans)
- École secondaire publique l'Héritage (Cornwall)
- École secondaire publique Louis-Riel (Gloucester)
- École secondaire publique Omer-Deslauriers (Ottawa)
- École secondaire publique le Transit (Ottawa)
- École secondaire publique Marc-Garneau (Trenton)
- École secondaire publique Mille-Îles (Kingston)
- École secondaire publique De La Salle (Ottawa)
- École secondaire publique le Sommet (Hawkesbury)
- École secondaire publique Pierre-de-Blois (Barrhaven, Ottawa)
