= Renfrew County Courthouse =

Heritage property in Ontario, Canada

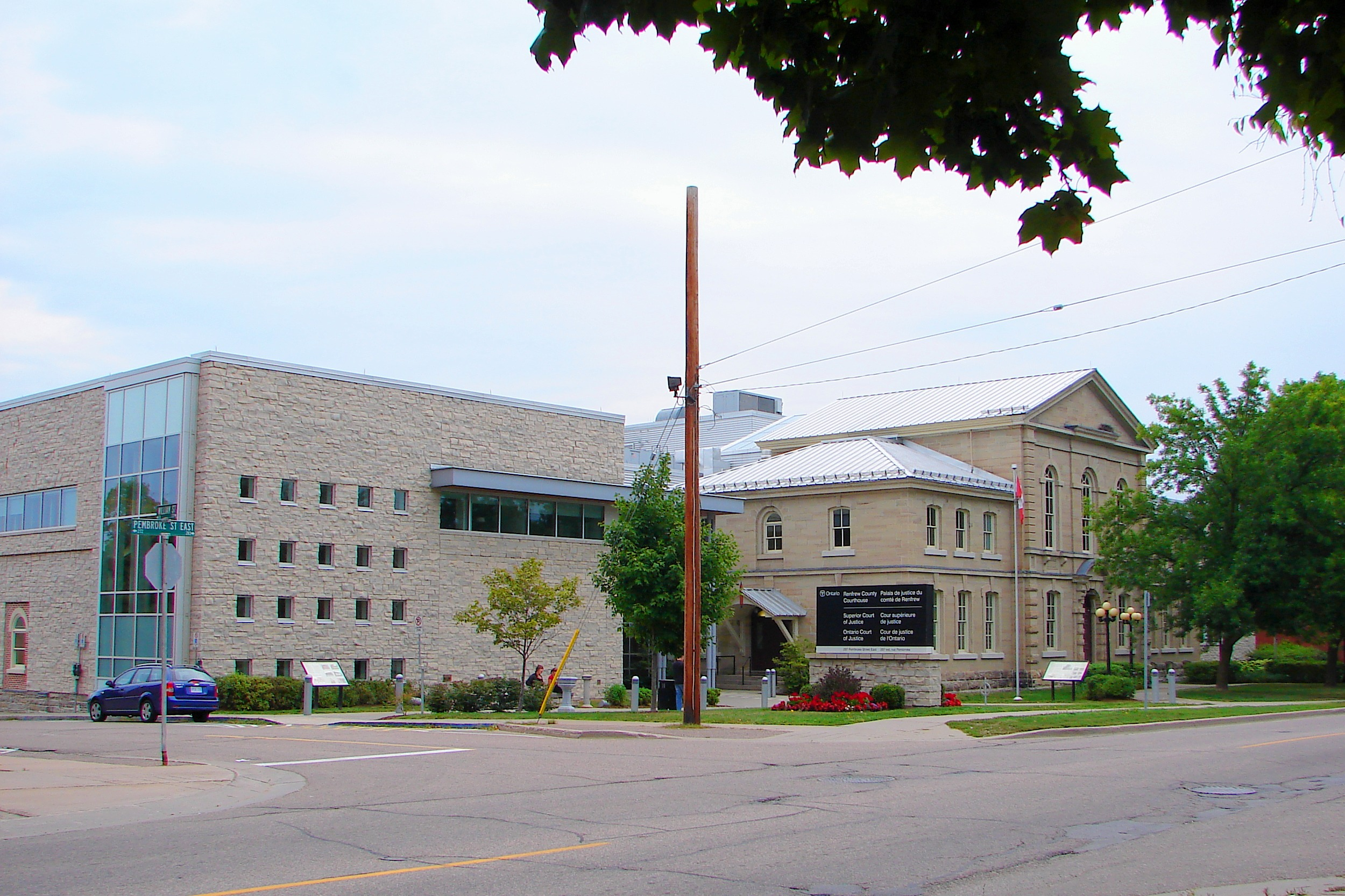
- Interactive map of the Renfrew County Courthouse area
- Alternative names: Pembroke Courthouse

General information
- Architectural style: Neoclassical
- Location: Pembroke, Ontario, Canada, 297 Pembroke Street East
- Coordinates: 45°49′38.08″N 77°6′23.31″W
- Current tenants: Attorney General of Ontario
- Construction started: 1862
- Completed: 1866
- Inaugurated: 1867
- Renovated: 2007
- Renovation cost: $23 million CAD
- Owner: Ontario Realty Corporation

Technical details
- Floor area: 75,000 ft^{2} (7,000 m^{2})

Design and construction
- Architect: Henry Horsey

Renovating team
- Renovating firm: NORR Limited Architects and Engineers
- Awards and prizes: Certificate of Merit; Office Building of the Year; People's Choice; Design Excellence

The Renfrew County Courthouse is a designated heritage property and operational courthouse in Pembroke, Ontario, Canada.

== Original building ==
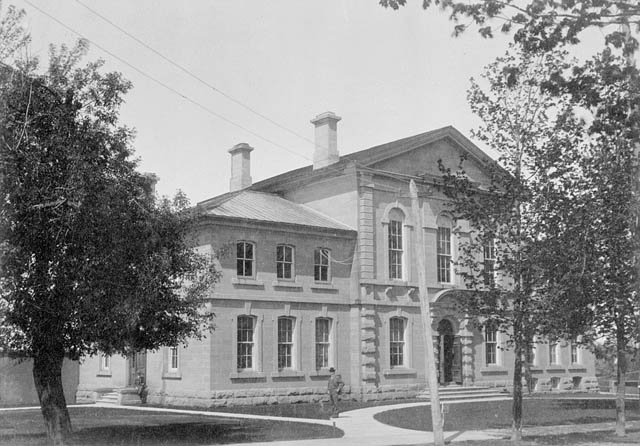
The courthouse in 1906

The neoclassical complex includes three buildings: the courthouse itself, a registry office and a small jail. The courthouse was built from 1862 to 1866, the registry office from 1862 to 1868, and the jail from 1864 to 1866. As the Confederation of Canada occurred in 1867, the building is referred to as "Confederation-era". The original courthouse was designed by Henry Horsey.

The registry office was built to the fire-prevention standards of the then-Chief Architect of Canada, Kivas Tully, who had an "obsession" with safety.

The sandstone used in the original construction was quarried at nearby Morrison Island.

The County Atlas of 1881 describes the courthouse as "one of the finest in Canada, combining the features of chaste beauty with simple elegance of construction in a degree possessed by few if any others in the country." The exterior of the registry was re-bricked in the 1980s, and the heritage value suffered.

== Designation ==
The complex is protected under the Cultural Heritage Protocol Agreement the Ministry of Tourism, Culture & Recreation and the Management Board Secretariat (Ontario Realty Corporation). It has not, however, been municipally designated under the Ontario Heritage Act.

== 2005 expansion ==
From 2005 to 2007, the building underwent significant heritage restoration. More than half of the original jail has been incorporated into the new facility. The renovation was led by NORR Limited Architects and Engineers.

The new construction used limestone from Guelph, Ontario. It added 48,276 square feet (4,485.0 m^{2}) to the 18,729 of the preserved historic buildings.

== Awards ==
- In 2006, the American Academy of Architects' Academy of Architecture for Justice awarded the courthouse a Certificate of Merit.
- In 2009, the courthouse was named "The Office Building of the Year" by the Building Owners and Managers Association of Ottawa. The same association certified the courthouse as meeting its Building Environmental Standards for the 2008-09 fiscal year.
- The Ontario Association of Architecture awarded the courthouse its "People's Choice" and "Design Excellence" awards in 2009.

== Contemporary use ==
The renovated courthouse currently houses both a Superior Court of Justice and an Ontario Court of Justice, using its six courtrooms. It also has "two jury deliberation rooms, two settlement rooms, a victim/witness program office, Crown attorney offices and a secure vehicle drop-off point for in-custody individuals."
