= École élémentaire et secondaire publique l'Équinoxe =

School in Ontario, Canada

Coordinates: 45.8235°N 77.1217°W

École élémentaire et secondaire publique l'Équinoxe is a primary and secondary school in Pembroke, Ontario. The school opened in September 1999 with 75 students from kindergarten to grade 8. The following year, a grade 9 was added, and a grade 10 the year after. The first graduation at l'Équinoxe was in 2006.

With the student population growing every year, the school moved to a bigger building in 2007. The school now has more than 250 students from kindergarten to grade 12. In this school they only speak French with one English class every other day from grade 4 to 12.

== Students ==
Despite the fact it is a school in Ontario it still has a number of students from Quebec. This is due to being on the border of the two provinces.
