= Conseil scolaire Viamonde =

School board in Ontario, Canada

Location
- 116 Cornelius Parkway, Toronto, Ontario, M6L 2K5 (educational management office); 1 Vanier Drive, Welland, Ontario, L3B 1A1 (business and financial office) Canada
- Coordinates: 43.71801°N 79.47548°W

District information
- Established: 1 January 1998 (through merger of several school boards)
- Chair of the board: Geneviève Oger
- Director of education: Michel Laverdière
- Schools: 39 daycares 41 elementary schools 16 high schools^{[1]}
- Budget: CA$254 973 849 (2022-2023)
- District ID: B66303

Students and staff
- Students: 13300
- Teachers: around 1,425
- Staff: 2,600 including teachers

Other information
- Elected trustees: Benoit Fortin; Kristine Dandavino; Marcel Tikeng Jounda; Pierre Gregory; David Paradis; Éric Lapointe; Stefania Sigurdson Forbes; Anna-Karyna Ruszkowski; Yvon Rochefort; Emmanuelle Richez; David O'Hara
- Website: csviamonde.ca

The Conseil scolaire Viamonde (CSV) is a public-secular French first language school board, and manages elementary and secondary schools in the Ontario Peninsula and the Greater Golden Horseshoe. The school board operates 41 elementary schools and 16 secondary schools within that area. The school board operates two offices, one in Toronto, and one in Welland. The educational management office is located in the Maple Leaf neighbourhood of Toronto, whereas the business and financial management office is located in Welland.

The school board was formed in 1998 after several local school boards were amalgamated into the French-language Public District School Board No. 58. From 1999 to 2010, the school board was known as Conseil Scolaire de District du Centre-Sud-Ouest. CSV is one of four members of the Association des conseils scolaires des écoles publiques de l'Ontario (ACÉPO).

== History ==
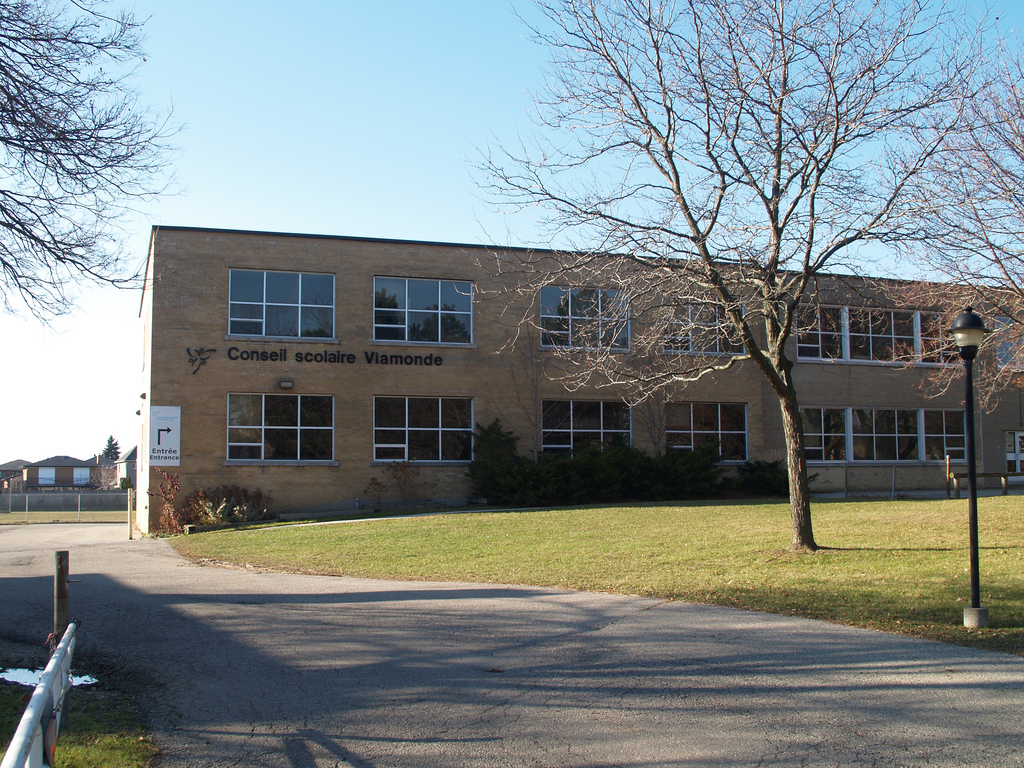
Educational management offices for Conseil scolaire Viamonde, in Toronto.

The board was created 1 January 1998 when the Government of Ontario decided to amalgamate several secular French school boards in the Ontario Peninsula (an area made of Southwestern Ontario, and the Greater Golden Horseshoe). School boards that were amalgamated included:

| Secular French school boards merged into CSV | Number of schools operated in 1997 |
|---|---|
| Conseil des écoles françaises de la communauté urbaine de Toronto | 5 elementary schools 2 secondary schools |
| Conseil scolaire de Niagara Sud | 5 elementary schools 1 secondary school |
| Conseil de l'éducation du comté de Simcoe | 3 elementary schools 1 secondary school |
| Conseil de l'éducation de la ville de London | 1 elementary school 1 secondary school |
| Conseil de l'éducation du comté de Lambton | 1 elementary school 1 secondary school |
| Conseil de la ville de Hamilton | 1 secondary school |

Shortly after the merger, the school board changed its name from French-language Public District School Board No. 58 to Conseil scolaire du district du Centre-Sud-Ouest. The school board continued to operate as Centre-Sud-Ouest until November 15, 2010, when its name was changed to Conseil scolaire Viamonde.

In 2011, the school board announced its intention to buy a number of unused Toronto District School Board buildings; in order to do so, it has to use funds from the Ontario's Ministry of Education. After the government denied the funding, the board then announced plans to file a lawsuit against the provincial government.

== List of schools ==
CSV presently operates 41 elementary schools and 15 secondary schools throughout Southwestern Ontario and most of the Greater Golden Horseshoe. The area in which the school board operates and provides schooling for covers 68,180 km^{2} of Ontario.^{[1]}

== See also ==
- List of school districts in Ontario
- List of high schools in Ontario
