= Daisy =

Daisy commonly refers to:

Bellis perennis, the common daisy, lawn daisy, or English daisy, a European species

Daisy, Daisies, daisy, daisies, or DAISY may also refer to:

== Other plants known as daisy ==
- Asteraceae, daisy family
  - Euryops chrysanthemoides, African bush daisy
  - Osteospermum, African daisy
  - Tetraneuris acaulis, angelita daisy
  - Melampodium leucanthum, blackfoot daisy
  - Glebionis coronaria, crown daisy
  - Brachyglottis greyi, daisy bush
  - Olearia, daisy bush
  - Argyranthemum, dill daisy, marguerite daisy
  - Rhodanthemum hosmariense, Moroccan daisy
  - Leucanthemum vulgare, oxeye daisy, dog daisy
  - Leucanthemum × superbum, Shasta daisy
  - Brachyscome, several species
  - Gerbera jamesonii, Barberton daisy, Transvaal daisy
  - Ismelia carinata, tricolor daisy
  - Perityle spp., rock daisy
- Scabiosa prolifera, Carmel daisy
- Globularia, globe daisies
- Cleretum bellidiforme, Livingstone daisy

== Arts, entertainment, and media ==
=== Film and television ===
- Daisy (advertisement), a controversial 1964 political TV advertisement
- Daisy (1923 film), a German silent romantic drama film
- Daisy (1988 film), a Malayalam musical love story
- Daisy (2006 film), a Korean urban romantic melodrama
- "Daisy" (How I Met Your Mother), an episode of the TV series
- Daisies (film), a 1966 Czech film

=== Music ===
- Daisy (Big Scary album), 2021
- Daisy (Brand New album), 2009, and a song from the album
- Daisy (Dog's Eye View album), 1997
- Daisy (Rusowsky album), 2025
- "Daisy" (Ashnikko song), by Ashnikko from the 2021 mixtape Demidevil
- "Daisy" (Bonnie Pink song), 1999
- "Daisy" a song by Halfway to Hazard from the 2007 album Halfway to Hazard
- "Daisy" (Pentagon song), by Pentagon from the 2020 EP WE:TH
- "Daisies" (Katy Perry song), 2020
- "Daisies" (Justin Bieber song), 2025
- "Daisy", a song by Fang Island from the 2010 album Fang Island
- "Daisy", a song by Switchfoot from the 2005 album Nothing Is Sound
- "Daisy", a song by Brotherhood of Man from the 1977 album Oh Boy!
- "Daisy", a song by Stone Temple Pilots from the 1996 album Tiny Music
- "Daisy", a song by Hafdís Huld from the 2009 album Synchronised Swimmers
- "Daisy", a song by Zedd from the 2015 album True Colors
- "Daisy", a song by Pond from the 2019 album Tasmania
- "Daisy Bell", an 1892 song with chorus "Daisy, Daisy, give me your answer, do...."

=== Literature ===
- "Daisy" (short story), 1977, by Joyce Carol Oates

== Businesses and organizations ==
- Daisy (Girl Scouts), a membership level
- Daisy Outdoor Products, known primarily as Daisy, an American air gun manufacturer
- Daisy Systems (disambiguation), several companies
- The Daisy, a nightclub on Rodeo Drive in Beverly Hills, California, U.S.
- Democracy is Freedom – The Daisy, known as The Daisy, an Italian political party
- Fort Wayne Daisies, an American women's professional baseball team 1945–1954
- Daisy, a brand of sour cream

== Computing ==
- Daisy wheel printing, an impact printing technology
- Digital Accessible Information System (DAISY), a technical standard for digital audiobooks
  - List of DAISY software
- Digital Automated Identification System (DAISY), an automated species identification system
- Dynamically Architected Instruction Set from Yorktown (DAISY), an early dynamic binary translation from IBM Research, ca. 1996

== People ==
- Daisy (given name), including a list of people and fictional characters with the name
- Daisy (nickname), including a list of people with the nickname

== Places ==
=== Australia ===
- Daisy Hill, Queensland
- Daisy Hill, Victoria

=== Canada ===
- Daisy Lake (disambiguation), several Canadian lakes

=== United States ===
- Daisy, Arkansas
- Daisy, Georgia
- Daisy, Kentucky
- Daisy, Maryland
- Daisy, Missouri
- Daisy, Oklahoma
- Daisy, Virginia
- Daisy, West Virginia
- Daisy Geyser, Yellowstone National Park
- Daisy Swamp, South Carolina
- Lake Daisy, Florida

== Other uses ==
- Daisy (cocktail), a traditional long drink
- Daisy (doll), a 1970s doll designed by Mary Quant
- Daisy (steamboat), which ran on Puget Sound, Washington, U.S., 1880–1897
- Operation Daisy, a 1981 military operation in Angola
- Tropical Storm Daisy, tropical cyclones named Daisy
- Daisy (perfume), a fragrance brand by Marc Jacobs
- Namaqualand Daisies, South Africa field hockey club

== See also ==
- Daisy chain (disambiguation)
- Daisy Dukes, short, tight denim shorts, named after The Dukes of Hazzard character Daisy Duke
- Daisy Hill (disambiguation)
- Daisy the Great, American indie pop band
- Daizy, a fictional character in Wow! Wow! Wubbzy!
- DayZ (disambiguation)
- Princess Daisy (disambiguation)
