= Daisy Lake =

Daisy Lake may refer to the following Canadian lakes:

- Daisy Lake (British Columbia)
- Daisy Lake (Northwest Territories)
- Daisy Lake (Algoma District), Ontario
- Daisy Lake (Greater Sudbury), Ontario
- Daisy Lake (Nipissing District), Ontario
- Daisy Lake (Thunder Bay District), Ontario

== See also ==
- Lake Daisy (Florida)
