= Chaining (disambiguation) =

Chaining is a teaching procedure. It may also refer to:

- Back-chaining
- Backward chaining
- Chaining (vector processing)
- Daisy chaining DNA
- Exception chaining
- Forward chaining
- Index chaining -- the calculation of price or quantity indexes by computing all intermediate period-to-period changes
- Method chaining
- New York City Subway chaining
- Separate chaining
- Skill chaining

== See also ==
- Chain
- Chain (disambiguation)
