= List of lakes of Ontario: D =

This is a list of lakes of Ontario beginning with the letter D.

== Da ==
- Dace Lake (Manitoulin District)
- Dace Lake (Nipissing District)
- Dace Lake (Sudbury District)
- Dack Lake
- Dacy Lake
- Dad Lake (Algoma District)
- Dad Lake (Rainy River District)
- Dadson Lake
- Daer Lake
- Dafoe Lake (Hastings County)
- Dafoe Lake (Thunder Bay District)
- Dagger Lake (Haliburton County)
- Dagger Lake (Thunder Bay District)
- Dagimabrop Lake
- Dagmar Lake
- Dagny Lake
- Dagwood Lake
- Dahinda Lake
- Dahlin Lake
- Dai Lake
- Dainty Lake (Parry Sound District)
- Dainty Lake (Kenora District)
- Daisy Lake (Algoma District)
- Daisy Lake (Greater Sudbury)
- Daisy Lake (Nipissing District)
- Daisy Lake (Thunder Bay District)
- Daisy Mae Lake
- Dakota Lake
- Dale Lake
- Dales Lake
- Daley Lake
- Dalgas Lake
- Dalglish Lake
- Dalhousie Lake
- Dallaire Lake
- Dallas Lake
- Lake Dalrymple (Ontario)
- D'Alton Lake
- Dalton Lake (Timiskaming District)
- Dalton Lake (Thunder Bay District)
- Daly Lake
- Dam Lake (Renfrew County)
- Dam Lake (Thunder Bay District)
- Damer Lake
- Damn Lake
- Damocles Lake
- Damon Lake
- D'Amour Lake
- Dan Lake (Nipissing District)
- Dan Lake (Sudbury District)
- Dan Lake (Muskoka District)
- Dan Lake (Frontenac County)
- Dan's Lake
- Dana Lake (Cochrane District)
- Dana Lake (Algoma District)
- Danae Lake
- Danby Lake (Thunder Bay District)
- Danby Lake (Frontenac County)
- Danford Lake
- Daniel Lake
- Daniels Lake
- Dankert Lake
- Danny Lake (Thunder Bay District)
- Danny Lake (Algoma District)
- Dans Lake
- Daoust Lake
- Daphne Lake
- Dara Lake
- Darbon Lake
- Darby Lake (Timiskaming District)
- Darby Lake (Rainy River District)
- Darce Lake
- D'Arcy Lake (Sudbury District)
- D'Arcy Lake (Thunder Bay District)
- Dark Lake (Kenora District)
- Dark Lake (Hastings County)
- Dark Lake (Muskoka District)
- Dark Lake (Algoma District)
- Dark Lake (Timiskaming District)
- Darkness Lake
- Darkwater Lake (Forgie Township, Kenora District)
- Darkwater Lake (Rainy River District)
- Darkwater Lake (GTP Block 7 Township, Kenora District)
- Darling Lake (Kenora District)
- Darling Lake (Frontenac County)
- Darling Long Lake
- Darling Round Lake
- Darlington's Lake
- D'Armour Lake
- Darragh Lake
- Darrell Lake
- Darrow Lake
- Dart Lake
- D'Artagnan Lake
- Dartford Pond
- Darwin Lake
- Dasent Lake
- Dash Lake (Rainy River District)
- Dash Lake (Thunder Bay District)
- Dashwa Lake
- Daughter Lake
- Dave Lake (Cochrane District)
- Dave Lake (Plourde Township, Algoma District)
- Dave Lake (Sudbury District)
- Dave Lake (Saunders Township, Algoma District)
- Davern Lake
- David Lake (Frost Township, Algoma District)
- David Lake (Butt Township, Nipissing District)
- David Lake (Rainy River District)
- David Lake (Elliot Lake)
- David Lake (Sudbury District)
- David Lake (Kenora District)
- David Lake (Odlum Township, Algoma District)
- David Lake (Temagami)
- David Lakes
- David Thompson Lake
- David's Lake
- Davidson Lake (Fog Creek, Thunder Bay District)
- Davidson Lake (Matachewan)
- Davidson Lake (Stirling Township, Thunder Bay District)
- Davidson Lake (Kenora District)
- Davidson Lake (Van Hise Township, Timiskaming District)
- Davidson Lake (Beeva Creek, Thunder Bay District)
- Davidson's Lake
- Davieaux Lake
- Davies Lake (Muskoka District)
- Davies Lake (Algoma District)
- Davies Lake (Thunder Bay District)
- Davies Lake (Kenora District)
- Davis Lake (Frontenac County)
- Davis Lake (Carnegie Township, Cochrane District)
- Davis Lake (Sudbury District)
- Davis Lake (Tolstoi Township, Cochrane District)
- Davis Lake (Algoma District)
- Davis Lake (Haliburton County)
- Davis Lake (Thunder Bay District)
- Davis Lake (Kenora District)
- Davis Pond
- Davison Lake (Rainy River District)
- Davison Lake (Thunder Bay District)
- Davy Lake
- Dawdy Lake
- Dawn Lake (Algoma District)
- Dawn Lake (Thunder Bay District)
- Dawn Lake (Nipissing District)
- Dawson Lake (Kenora District)
- Dawson Lake (Kashabowie Lake, Thunder Bay District)
- Dawson Lake (Black Bay Peninsula, Thunder Bay District)
- Dawson Lake (Miniss River, Thunder Bay District)
- Dawson Ponds
- Day Lake (Camp Creek, Rainy River District)
- Day Lake (Griffin Township, Cochrane District)
- Day Lake (McCaul Township, Rainy River District)
- Day Lake (Thunder Bay District)
- Day Lake (Parry Sound District)
- Day Lake (Wacousta Township, Cochrane District)
- Day Lake (Sudbury District)
- Dayle Lake
- Dayohessarah Lake
- Days Lake
- Daystar Lake
- Dazzle Lake

== Dea ==
- Dea Lake
- Deacon Lake (Partridge Lake, Kenora District)
- Deacon Lake (Knicely Township, Kenora District)
- Deacon Lake (Nipissing District)
- Deacon Lake (Rainy River District)
- Deacon Lake (Kenora)
- Deacon Lake (Sudbury District)
- Deacon Lake (Emry Township, Algoma District)
- Deacon Lake (Timiskaming District)
- Dead Dog Lake
- Dead Horse Lake (Parry Sound District)
- Dead Horse Lake (Algoma District)
- Dead Horse Lake (Thunder Bay District)
- Dead Horse Lake (Haliburton County)
- Dead Lake (McConnell Township, Sudbury District)
- Dead Lake (Greenstone)
- Dead Lake (Algoma District)
- Dead Lake (Kenora District)
- Dead Lake (Cecile Township, Thunder Bay District)
- Dead Lake (Manitouwadge)
- Dead Lake (Biscotasi Township, Sudbury District)
- Dead Moose Lake
- Dead Otter Lake (Thunder Bay District)
- Dead Otter Lake (Algoma District)
- Dead Shot Lake
- Deaddog Lake
- Deadfish Lake
- Deadhead Lake
- Deadman Lake
- Deadman's Lake
- Deadtree Lake
- Deadwood Lake
- Deak Lake
- Dean Lake (Kenora District)
- Dean Lake (Algoma District)
- Dean Lake (Sudbury District)
- Dean Lake (Nipissing District)
- Dean Lake (Greater Sudbury)
- Deans Lake
- Deans Pond
- Dearden Lake
- Death Lake
- Deatys Lake
- Deavy Lake

== Deb–Dem ==
- Deb Lake
- DeBaere Lake
- De Blicquy Lake
- De Bois Lake
- Debris Lake
- Decair Lake
- Decarie Lake
- Deception Lake (Boys Township, Kenora District)
- Deception Lake (GTP Block 10 Township, Kenora District)
- Deception Lake (Hastings County)
- Deception Lake (Thunder Bay District)
- Deception Lake (Cochrane District)
- Decision Lake
- Deckers Lake
- De Courcey Lake
- DeCourcey Lake
- Decoy Lake (Thunder Bay District)
- Decoy Lake (Nipissing District)
- Decross Lake
- Dedee Lake
- Dedo Lake
- Deebank Lake
- Deecee Lake
- Deeds Lake
- Deek Lake
- Deep Lake (Acadia Township, Sudbury District)
- Deep Lake (Macklem Township, Timmins)
- Deep Lake (Thunder Bay District)
- Deep Lake (Parry Sound District)
- Deep Lake (Miller Township, North Frontenac)
- Deep Lake (Melrose Township, Sudbury District)
- Deep Lake (Mount Joy Township, Timmins)
- Deep Lake (Clarendon Township, North Frontenac)
- Deep Lake (Renfrew County)
- Deep Lake (Algoma District)
- Deep Water Lake
- Deer Lake (Telfer Township, Sudbury District)
- Deer Lake (Bradshaw Township, Kenora District)
- Deer Lake (Bevin Township, Sudbury District)
- Deer Lake (Deer Lake)
- Deer Lake (Booth Township, Thunder Bay District)
- Deer Lake (Manitoulin District)
- Deer Lake (Muskoka District)
- Deer Lake (Algoma District)
- Deer Lake (Lount Township, Parry Sound District)
- Deer Lake (Nipissing District)
- Deer Lake (Rainy River District)
- Deer Lake (Wintering Lake, Kenora District)
- Deer Lake (Armour)
- Deer Lake (Dorion)
- Deer Lake (Kawartha Lakes)
- Deer Lake (Lanark County)
- Deer Lake (Haliburton County)
- Deer Lake (Hastings County)
- Deer Lake (Frontenac County)
- Deer Lake (Cochrane District)
- Deer Lake (Laberge Township, Thunder Bay District)
- Deer Lake (Truman Township, Sudbury District)
- Deer Yard Lake
- Deerfoot Lake
- Deerhorn Lake
- Deerhound Lake
- Deermeadow Lake
- Deerock Lake
- Deerskin Lake
- Deerskull Lake
- Defoe Lake
- De Gaulle Lake
- DeGraff Lake
- Dehoux Lake
- Deils Lake
- Lac de Dejeuner
- Del Lake
- Delahey Lake
- Delaney Lake (Algoma District)
- Delaney Lake (Sudbury District)
- Delaney Lake (Kenora District)
- Delaney Lake (Nipissing District)
- Delano Lake
- Delbridge Lake
- De Lesseps Lake
- Delhi Lake
- Deline Lake
- Delink Lake
- Delisle Lake
- Dell Lake (Cochrane District)
- Dell Lake (Parry Sound District)
- Dell Lake (Rainy River District)
- Dellaires Lake
- Dello Lake
- Delmage Lake
- Delmer Lake
- Delorosbil Lake
- Delos Lake
- Delta Lake
- De Lucia Lake
- Deluge Lake
- Delusion Lake
- Deman Lake
- Demarco Lake (Cochrane District)
- Demarco Lake (Renfrew County)
- Demars Lake
- Demers Lake
- Demijohn Lake
- Demott Lake
- Dempseys Lake
- Dempster Lake (Sudbury District)
- Dempster Lake (Thunder Bay District)
- Dempster Lake (Kenora District)
- Demuth Lake

== Den ==
- Den Lake
- Denbigh Lake
- Denbigh Long Lake
- Dendroica Lake
- Denedus Lake
- Denis Lake (Lennox and Addington County)
- Denis Lake (Parry Sound District)
- Denis Lake (Thunder Bay District)
- Denison Lake (Elliot Lake)
- Denison Lake (Groiseilliers Township, Algoma District)
- Denmark Lake (Atikwa River, Kenora District)
- Denmark Lake (Benelux Creek, Kenora District)
- Denna Lake
- Dennie Lake (Thunder Bay District)
- Dennie Lake (Sudbury District)
- Dennies Lake
- Dennis Lake (Thunder Bay District)
- Dennis Lake (Kenora District)
- Dennis Lake (Nipissing District)
- Dennison Lake
- Dent Lake (Renfrew County)
- Dent Lake (Cochrane District)
- Denton Lake
- Denvic Lake
- Denyes Lake

== Dep–Der ==
- De Palma Lake
- Departure Lake
- Depensiers Lake
- Deplanche Lake
- Deposit Lake
- Depot Lake (Algoma District)
- Depot Lake (Sudbury District)
- Depot Lake (Haliburton County)
- Depot Lake (Nipissing District)
- Deratnay Lake
- Derby Lake
- Deresti Lake
- Derniere Lake (Sudbury District)
- Derniere Lake (Kenora District)
- Derraugh Lake
- Derry Lake (Algoma District)
- Derry Lake (Hastings County)
- Derry Lake (Kenora District)

== Des–Dey ==
- Desayeux Lake
- Desbarats Lake
- Desbiens Lake
- Desbois Lake (Algoma District)
- Desbois Lake (Sudbury District)
- Deschamp Lake
- Deschamps Lake
- Lac Deschênes
- Deschênes Lake
- Desert Lake (Timiskaming District)
- Desert Lake (Frontenac County)
- Deserted Lake
- Deshane Lake
- Lac Desjardins
- Desolation Lake
- Lake Despair
- Desperation Lake
- Despond Lakes
- Detach Lake
- Detector Lake
- Detour Lake (Thunder Bay District)
- Detour Lake (Kenora District)
- Detour Lake (Laidlaw Township, Cochrane District)
- Detour Lake (Detour River, Cochrane District)
- Dettbarn Lake
- Deuce Lake
- Deugo Lake
- Deutzia Lake
- Devanney Lake
- Devereaux Lake
- Devil Lake (Nipissing District)
- Devil Lake (Thunder Bay District)
- Devil Lake (Frontenac County)
- Devil's Lake (Haliburton County)
- Devil's Lake (Algoma District)
- Devils Bay Lake
- Devils Gap Lake
- Devils Hole
- Devils Lake (Renfrew County)
- Devils Lake (Peterborough County)
- Devils Punch Bowl Lake
- Devine Lake (Rainy River District)
- Devine Lake (Nipissing District)
- Devine Lake (Muskoka District)
- Devious Lake
- Devizes Lake
- Devlin Lake (Algoma District)
- Devlin Lake (Timiskaming District)
- Devlin Lake (Kenora District)
- De Volve Lake
- Devon Lake (Renfrew County)
- Devon Lake (Sudbury District)
- Devonshire Lake
- Devork Lake
- Devos Lake
- Dew Lake
- Dewan Lake
- Dewar Lake (Kenora District)
- Dewar Lake (Cochrane District)
- Dewdney Lake
- Dewey Lake
- Dewfish Lake
- Dewhirst Lake
- De Witt Lake
- Dewy Lake
- Dexter Lake (Thunder Bay District)
- Dexter Lake (Sudbury District)
- Dey's Pond

== Di ==
- Diabase Lake (Van Hise Township, Timiskaming District)
- Diabase Lake (Sudbury District)
- Diabase Lake (Brigstocke Township, Timiskaming District)
- Diablo Lake
- Diamond Drill Lake
- Diamond Lake (Cochrane District)
- Diamond Lake (Algoma District)
- Diamond Lake (Timiskaming District)
- Diamond Lake (Kenora District)
- Diamond Lake (Parry Sound District)
- Diamond Lake (Hastings County)
- Diamond Lake (Renfrew County)
- Diamond Lake (Sudbury District)
- Diamond Lake (Nipissing District)
- Dianthus Lake
- Dibben Lake
- Dibble Lake
- Dick Lake (Algoma District)
- Dick Lake (Sudbury District)
- Dick Lake (Thunder Bay District)
- Dick Lake (Nipissing District)
- Dick Lake (Parry Sound District)
- Dickens Lake
- Dickens Long Lake
- Dickenson Lake
- Dicker Lake
- Dickey Lake
- Dickie Lake (Thunder Bay District)
- Dickie Lake (Algoma District)
- Dickie Lake (Muskoka District)
- Dickison Lake
- Dicks Lake
- Dickson Lake (Cochrane District)
- Dickson Lake (Thunder Bay District)
- Dickson Lake (Nipissing District)
- Die Lake
- Diene Lake
- Dight Lake
- Dike Pond
- Dill Lake (Grenoble Township, Algoma District)
- Dill Lake (Esquega Township, Algoma District)
- Dilla Lake
- Dillabough Lake (Kenora District)
- Dillabough Lake (Timiskaming District)
- Dillen Lake
- Dillon Lake (Sudbury District)
- Dillon Lake (Algoma District)
- Dillons Pond
- Dillow Lakes
- Dils Lake
- Dime Lake
- Dimock Lake
- Dimple Lake
- Ding Lake
- Dingee Lake
- Dingley Lake
- Dingman Lake
- Dinkin Lake
- Dinner Lake (Nipissing District)
- Dinner Lake (Parry Sound District)
- Dinner Lake (Rainy River District)
- Dinnick Lake
- Dinny Lake (Timiskaming District)
- Dinny Lake (Algoma District)
- Dinorwic Lake
- Dinwiddie Lake
- Dionne Lake
- Dip Lake
- Dipinto Lake
- Dipneedle Lake
- Dipper Lake
- Direct Lake
- Dirty Lake
- Dirtywater Lake
- Disbrowe Lake
- Discovery Lake (Kenora District)
- Discovery Lake (Thunder Bay District)
- Dishaw Lake
- Dishnish Lake
- Dishpan Lake
- Disk Lake
- Dismal Lake (Way-White Township, Algoma District)
- Dismal Lake (Larkin Township, Algoma District)
- Dismal Lake (Sudbury District)
- Disraeli Lake
- Distant Lake
- District Lake
- Div Lake
- Dive Lake
- Diver Lake (Sudbury District)
- Diver Lake (Nipissing District)
- Diversion Lake
- Divide Lake (Timiskaming District)
- Divide Lake (Sioux Narrows-Nestor Falls)
- Divide Lake (Viking Lake, Kenora District)
- Divided Lake
- Dividing Lake (Haliburton County)
- Dividing Lake (Sudbury District)
- Division Lake
- Dixie Lake (Renfrew County)
- Dixie Lake (Haliburton County)
- Dixie Lake (Kenora District)
- Dixon Lake (Hoey Township, Sudbury District)
- Dixon Lake (Schembri Township, Sudbury District)
- Dixon Lake (Lanark County)
- Dixon Lake (Timiskaming District)
- Dixon Lake (Hastings County)
- Dizzy Lake (Kenora District)
- Dizzy Lake (Nipissing District)

== Doa–Dom ==
- Doan Lake
- Doats Lake
- Dobbie Lake (Sudbury District)
- Dobbie Lake (Lanark County)
- Dobbs Lake (Parry Sound District)
- Dobbs Lake (Algoma District)
- Dobie Lake (Timiskaming District)
- Dobie Lake (Kenora District)
- Dobie Lake (Algoma District)
- Dobson Lake
- Doc Greig Lake
- Docker Lake
- Docks Lake
- Doctor Lake (Parry Sound District)
- Doctor Lake (Lanark County)
- Doctor's Pond
- Dodd Lake (Thunder Bay District)
- Dodd Lake (Sudbury District)
- Dodds Lake (Frontenac County)
- Dodds Lake (Rabazo Township, Algoma District)
- Dodds Lake (Renfrew County)
- Dodds Lake (Arnott Township, Algoma District)
- Dodds Lake (Cochrane District)
- Dodds Pond
- Dodge Lake (Renfrew County)
- Dodge Lake (Frontenac County)
- Dodge Lake (Algoma District)
- Dody Lake
- Doe Lake (Parry Sound District)
- Doe Lake (Thunder Bay District)
- Doe Lake (Nipissing District)
- Doe Lake (Cochrane District)
- Doe Lake (Muskoka District)
- Doe Lake (Frontenac County)
- Dog Lake (Lessard Township, Algoma District)
- Dog Lake (Noonan Lake, Kenora District)
- Dog Lake (Kaministiquia River, Thunder Bay District)
- Dog Lake (Severn River, Kenora District)
- Dog Lake (Yesno Township, Thunder Bay District)
- Dog Lake (Lennox and Addington County)
- Dog Lake (Nipissing District)
- Dog Lake (North Frontenac)
- Dog Lake (Dog Creek, Kenora District)
- Dog Lake (Keys Lake, Kenora District)
- Dog Lake (Riggs Township, Algoma District)
- Dog Lake (South Frontenac)
- Dog Lake (Parry Sound District)
- Dog Lake (Central Frontenac)
- Dogfish Lake
- Dogfly Lake
- Doghole Lake
- Dogpaw Lake
- Dogtooth Lake
- Dogue Lake
- Doherty Lake (Pelletier Township, Algoma District)
- Doherty Lake (Abotossaway Township, Algoma District)
- Doidge Lake
- Doig Lake (Lennox and Addington County)
- Doig Lake (Timiskaming District)
- Dokis Lake (Sudbury District)
- Dokis Lake (Timiskaming District)
- Dokis Lake (Cochrane District)
- Dolan Lake (Thunder Bay District)
- Dolan Lake (Nipissing District)
- Dole Lake
- Doley Lake
- Dollar Lake
- Lac Dollard-des-Ormeaux
- Dollars Lake
- Dolly Lake (Thunder Bay District)
- Dolly Lake (Nipissing District)
- Dollyberry Lake
- Dolores Lake
- Domain Lake
- Doman Lake
- Dome Lake (Kenora District)
- Dome Lake (Thunder Bay District)
- Dominic Lake
- Dominick Lake
- Dominion Lake (Barrett Township, Kenora District)
- Dominion Lake (Lake of the Woods, Kenora District)

== Don–Dop ==
- Don Lake (Gooch Creek, Kenora District)
- Don Lake (Don Creek, Kenora District)
- Don Lake (Muskeg River, Kenora District)
- Don's Lake
- Dona Lake
- Donahue Lake (Thunder Bay District)
- Donahue Lake (Lennox and Addington County)
- Donahue Long Lake
- Donald Lake (Kenora District)
- Donald Lake (Sudbury District)
- Donald Lake (Thunder Bay District)
- Donald Lakes
- Donaldson Lake (Kenora District)
- Donaldson Lake (Timiskaming District)
- Donar Lake
- Doncaster Lake
- Donch Lake
- Donnegana Lake
- Donnelly Lake (Manitumieg Lake, Kenora District)
- Donnelly Lake (Muskoka District)
- Donnelly Lake (Donnelly River, Kenora District)
- Donnet Lake
- Donovan Lake
- Donovans Lake
- Donson Lake
- Donut Lake
- Dools Lake
- Doon Lake
- Doone Lake
- Dooners Pond
- Door Lake
- Dope Lake

== Dor–Doz ==
- Dora Lake (Pinard Township, Cochrane District)
- Dora Lake (Timiskaming District)
- Dora Lake (Cochrane)
- Dora Lake (Parry Sound District)
- Dora Lake (Kenora District)
- Dora Lake (Thunder Bay District)
- Dorami Lake
- Doran Lake (Frontenac County)
- Doran Lake (Algoma District)
- Doran Lake (Timiskaming District)
- Doran Lake (Thunder Bay District)
- Doran Lake (Simcoe County)
- Doran's Lake
- Lake Doré
- Doré Lake (Algoma District)
- Doré Lake (Kenora District)
- Doré Lake (Rainy River District)
- Doreen Lake
- Dorigo Lake
- Doris Lake (Thunder Bay District)
- Doris Lake (Sudbury District)
- Doris Lake (Nipissing District)
- Dorman Lake
- Dorosh Lake
- Dorothy Lake (Timiskaming District)
- Dorothy Lake (Sudbury District)
- Dorothy Lake (Rainy River District)
- Dorothy Lake (Trout River, Kenora District)
- Dorothy Lake (Dobie River, Kenora District)
- Dorothy Lake (Thunder Bay District)
- Dorsalfin Lake
- Dorsey Lake
- Dory Lake (Cochrane District)
- Dory Lake (Kenora District)
- Doss Lake
- Dossier Lake
- Dot Lake (Misehkow River, Thunder Bay District)
- Dot Lake (Robbie Creek, Thunder Bay District)
- Dot Lake (Muskoka District)
- Dot Pond
- Dotted Lake (Thunder Bay District)
- Dotted Lake (Kenora District)
- Dottie Lake
- Dotty Lake
- Double Lake (Upper Manitou Lake, Kenora District)
- Double Lake (Rainy River District)
- Double Lake (Cedar River, Kenora District)
- Double Loon Lake
- Double Track Lake
- Doubloon Lake
- Doubtful Lake (Sioux Narrows-Nestor Falls)
- Doubtful Lake (North Caribou Lake, Kenora District)
- Doubtful Lake (Sudbury District)
- Doucette Lake
- Doug Lake
- Dougall Lake (Algoma District)
- Dougall Lake (Thunder Bay District)
- Dougherty Lake (Sudbury District)
- Dougherty Lake (Cochrane District)
- Doughnut Lake (Thunder Bay District)
- Doughnut Lake (Muskoka District)
- Douglas Lake (Frost Township, Algoma District)
- Douglas Lake (Mulcahy Township, Kenora District)
- Douglas Lake (Black River-Matheson)
- Douglas Lake (Lake of the Woods, Kenora District)
- Douglas Lake (Simcoe County)
- Douglas Lake (Muskoka District)
- Douglas Lake (Guilfoyle Township, Cochrane District)
- Douglas Lake (Douglas Creek, Kenora District)
- Douglas Lake (Garden River 14)
- Dougs Lake
- Doule Lake
- Doull Lake
- Dove Lake (Thunder Bay District)
- Dove Lake (Nipissing District)
- Dovetail Lake
- Dow Lake
- Dow's Lake
- Dowden Lake
- Dowes Lake
- Dowie Lake
- Dowling Lake
- Downer Lake
- Downes Lake
- Downey Lake (Timiskaming District)
- Downey Lake (Thunder Bay District)
- Downhill Lake
- Downie Lake
- Dowsett Lake
- Dowsley Lake
- Dowswell Lake
- Doyle Lake (Kenora District)
- Doyle Lake (Algoma District)
- Doyle Lake (Sudbury District)
- Doyle Lake (Renfrew County)
- Doze Lake
- Dozy Lake

== Dr ==
- Drag Lake (Hastings County)
- Drag Lake (Haliburton County)
- Dragon Lake (Rainy River District)
- Dragon Lake (Thunder Bay District)
- Dragonfly Lake
- Drake Lake (Rainy River District)
- Drake Lake (Kenora District)
- Draper Lake (Frontenac County)
- Draper Lake (Parry Sound District)
- Draper Lake (Sudbury District)
- Draper Lake (Rainy River District)
- Drawdi Lake
- Draycot Lake
- Dreamhaven Lake
- Dreamy Lake
- Dreany Lake (Algoma District)
- Dreany Lake (Nipissing District)
- Drefal Lake
- Drefkes Lake
- Drew Lake
- Drewery Lake
- Drewry Lake
- Drexler Lakes
- Drict Lake
- Drie Lake
- Drift Lake
- Driftstone Lake
- Driftwood Lake
- Drill Lake
- Driscoll Lake
- Drive Lake
- Driver Lake (Parry Sound District)
- Driver Lake (Kenora District)
- Driving Lake
- Drizzle Lake
- Drohan Lake
- Drohans Ponds
- Drop Lake (Timiskaming District)
- Drop Lake (Kenora District)
- Dropledge Lake
- Drowsy Lake
- Druces Lake
- Drum Lake (Osprey Lake, Kenora District)
- Drum Lake (Drum Creek, Kenora District)
- Drumlin Lake
- Drumm Lake
- Drummer Lake
- Drurys Pond
- Dry Lake (Stone Mills)
- Dry Lake (Renfrew County)
- Dry Lake (Cascaden Township, Sudbury District)
- Dry Lake (Sladen Township, Sudbury District)
- Dry Lake (Nipissing District)
- Dry Lake (Thunder Bay District)
- Dry Lake (Addington Highlands)
- Dry Lake (Haldimand County)
- Dry Lake (Kenora District)
- Dry Lake (Hastings County)
- Dry Lakes
- Dryberry Lake
- Drynan Lake
- Drysdales Pond

== Dua–Dum ==
- Dua Lake
- Dub Lake
- Dubbelewe Lake
- Dube Lake
- Dubé Lake
- Dublin Lake
- Lake Duborne
- Dubrois Lake
- Dubroy Lake (Algoma District)
- Dubroy Lake (Thunder Bay District)
- Dubroy Lake (Cochrane District)
- Ducell Lake
- Duchabani Lake
- Ducharme Lake (Nipissing District)
- Ducharme Lake (Kenora District)
- Duchesnay Lake
- Duck Lake (Rioux Township, Algoma District)
- Duck Lake (Blind River)
- Duck Lake (Nipissing)
- Duck Lake (Craig Township, Sudbury District)
- Duck Lake (Brown Township, Parry Sound District)
- Duck Lake (Timmins)
- Duck Lake (Kawartha Lakes)
- Duck Lake (Kenora District)
- Duck Lake (Hastings County)
- Duck Lake (Renfrew County)
- Duck Lake (Frontenac County)
- Duck Lake (Haliburton County)
- Duck Lake (Rainy River District)
- Duck Lake (O'Brien Township, Cochrane District)
- Duck Lake (Seguin)
- Duck Lake (Nipissing District)
- Duck Lake (Duck Creek, Thunder Bay District)
- Duck Lake (Kearney)
- Duck Lake (Wilson Township, Parry Sound District)
- Duck Lake (Roberts Township, Sudbury District)
- Duck Lake (Terrace Bay)
- Duck Pond (Peterborough County)
- Duck Pond (Kenora District)
- Duckbill Lake (Sudbury District)
- Duckbill Lake (Thunder Bay District)
- Duckbreast Lake
- Duckling Lake (Thunder Bay District)
- Duckling Lake (Kenora District)
- Ducknest Lake
- Duckpond Lake
- Ducks Egg Lake
- Duckshead Lake
- Duckwing Lake
- Dud Lake (Kenora District)
- Dud Lake (Sudbury District)
- Dud Lake (Thunder Bay District)
- Dude Lake
- Dufault Lake
- Duff Lake (Sudbury District)
- Duff Lake (West Nipissing)
- Duff Lake (Bronson Township, Nipissing District0
- Duff Lake (Rainy River District)
- Duffell Lake
- Dufferin Lake
- Duffy Lake
- Duffy Lakes
- Duffys Lake
- Dufton Lake
- Dugal Lake
- Dugan Lake
- Duggan Lake
- Dugout Lake
- Duguay Lake
- Dugwal Pit
- Duhaime Lake
- Duke Lake (Renfrew County)
- Duke Lake (Sudbury District)
- Duke Lake (Algoma District)
- Dumas Lake (Thunder Bay District)
- Dumas Lake (Rainy River District)
- Dumbbell Lake (Rainy River District)
- Dumbbell Lake (Murky Creek, Thunder Bay District)
- Dumbbell Lake (Kenora District)
- Dumbbell Lake (Long Lake, Thunder Bay District)
- Dumbell Lake (Mons Township, Algoma District)
- Dumbell Lake (Sudbury District)
- Dumbell Lake (Simcoe County)
- Dumbell Lake (Assef Township, Algoma District)
- Dumbell Lake (Elliot Lake)
- Dumbell Lakes
- Dummy Lake
- Dumond Lake (Timiskaming District)
- Dumond Lake (Nipissing District)
- Dumont Lake
- Dump Lake (Thunder Bay District)
- Dump Lake (Renfrew County)
- Dump Lake (Parry Sound District)
- Dumpy Lake

== Dun–Dux ==
- Dun Lake
- Dunbar Lake (Sudbury District)
- Dunbar Lake (Timiskaming District)
- Dunbar Lake (Parry Sound District)
- Dunbar Lake (Kenora District)
- Dunbar Lake (Leeds and Grenville United Counties)
- Dunbrack Lake
- Dunc Lake
- Duncan Lake (Nipissing District)
- Duncan Lake (Frontenac County)
- Duncan Lake (Grey County)
- Duncan Lake (Parry Sound District)
- Duncan Lake (Rainy River District)
- Duncan Lake (Timiskaming District)
- Duncan Lake (Sudbury District)
- Duncan's Pond
- Duncannon Lake
- Duncanson Lake
- Dunchurch Lake
- Duncs Lake
- Dundonald Lake
- Dunham Lake
- Dunkel Lake
- Dunkerley Lake
- Dunkirk Lake
- Dunlop Lake (Renfrew County)
- Dunlop Lake (Algoma District)
- Dunmark Lake
- Dunn Lake (Muskoka District)
- Dunn Lake (Kenora District)
- Dunn Lake (Cochrane District)
- Dunne Lake (Shikag River, Thunder Bay District)
- Dunne Lake (Cochrane District)
- Dunne Lake (Sudbury District)
- Dunne Lake (Upper Roslyn Lake, Thunder Bay District)
- Dunnet Lake
- Dunns Lake (North Algona Wilberforce)
- Dunns Lake (Head, Clara and Maria)
- Dunns Lakes
- Dunphy Lake
- Dunrankin Lake
- Duns Lake
- Dunstan Lake (Kenora District)
- Dunstan Lake (Parry Sound District)
- Duplex Lake
- Duplicate Lakes
- Dupre Lake
- Dupuis Lake
- Dural Lake
- Duralia Lake
- Durban Lake
- Durer Lake
- Durie Lake
- Durkee Lake
- Durkin Lake
- Durn Lake
- Durnell Lake
- Durocher Lake
- Durrel Lake
- Durrell Lake (Kenora District)
- Durrell Lake (Parry Sound District)
- Dusey Lake
- Dusk Lake (Cochrane District)
- Dusk Lake (Nipissing District)
- Dusk Lake (Parry Sound District)
- Dusky Lake
- Dusten Lake
- Dusty Lake (Thunder Bay District)
- Dusty Lake (Algoma District)
- Dutch Lake
- Dutcher Lake
- Dutchman Lake
- Dutchmans Lake
- Duthorne Lake
- Dutton Lake
- Duval Lake
- Duxfield Lake

== Dw–Dy ==
- Dwight Lake
- Dwy Lake
- Dwyer Lake
- Dycie Lake
- Dyelle Lake
- Dyer Lake (Thunder Bay District)
- Dyer Lake (Cochrane District)
- Dyer Lake (Algoma District)
- Dyment Lake (Sudbury District)
- Dyment Lake (Algoma District)
- Dymond Lake (Devine Township, Nipissing District)
- Dymond Lake (McAuslan Township, Nipissing District)
- Dyson Lake (Algoma District)
- Dyson Lake (Parry Sound District)
