= Daisy chain =

Daisy chain may refer to:

- Daisy chain, a garland created from daisy flowers
- Daisy chain (climbing), a type of strap
- Daisy chain (electrical engineering), a wiring scheme
- Daisy chain (fishing), a type of fishing lure
- Daisy chain (knot), or chain sinnet
- Daisy chain (network topology), for connecting computers
- Daisy chain (sex), a type of group sex
- Daisy chaining DNA, when DNA undergoing PCR amplification becomes tangled
- Daisy Chain (Record Label), a subsidiary of Almighty Records
- Daisy Chain (Sapphire & Steel), a 2005 audio drama
- The Daisy Chain (California band), an American band
- Daisy Chain Fields, a music festival in Irvine, California

== See also ==
- Daisy (disambiguation)
