= Bluejay Creek (Pic River tributary) =

- Location of the mouth of Bluejay Creek in Ontario

Location
- Country: Canada
- Province: Ontario
- Region: Northwestern Ontario
- District: Thunder Bay

Physical characteristics
- Source: Unnamed lake
  - coordinates: 49°32′32″N 86°08′18″W
  - elevation: 346 m (1,135 ft)
- Mouth: Pic River
  - coordinates: 49°31′38″N 86°12′30″W
  - elevation: 313 m (1,027 ft)
- Length: 12 km (7.5 mi)

Bluejay Creek is a river in the east part of Thunder Bay District in northwestern Ontario, Canada. It is in the Lake Superior drainage basin and is a tributary of the Pic River.

== Course ==
The creek begins at an unnamed lake at an elevation of 346 metres (1,135 ft). It flows north from the north end of the lake, then turns southwest and reaches Bluejay Lake. The creek then exits at the southwest of the lake and flows west to reach its mouth at the Pic River at an elevation of 313 metres (1,027 ft), just upstream of the Bigrock Rapids and about 12 kilometres (7 mi) southwest of the community of Caramat.

== See also ==
- List of rivers of Ontario
