= DWY =

DWY or dwy can refer to:

- DWY, a London, UK-based rhythm and blues artist signed to Loud Robot, a record label owned by Bad Robot
- Dhuwal language, a dialect continuum indigenous to the Northern Territory of Australia, by ISO 639 code
- Dwy Lake, a lake in Ontario, Canada; see List of lakes of Ontario: D
- Pantodontidae, a family of ray-finned fishes, by Catalogue of Life identifier
