= McKay Lake (Pic River) =

- Location of McKay Lake in Ontario.
- Location: Thunder Bay, Ontario, Canada
- Coordinates: 49°36′48″N 86°26′17″W
- Type: Lake
- Primary inflows: Pout River, Sandlink Creek
- Primary outflows: Pic River
- Max. length: 19 km (12 mi)
- Max. width: 6 km (3.7 mi)
- Surface elevation: 321 m (1,053 ft)

McKay Lake is a lake in Lake Superior drainage basin in the east part of Thunder Bay District in northwestern Ontario, Canada and the source of the Pic River. The northeast tip of the lake is 2 kilometres (1.2 mi) southwest of the Canadian National Railway mainline, 15 kilometres (9 mi) south of Ontario Highway 11 and 17 kilometres (11 mi) west of the community of Caramat.

The lake is 19 kilometres (12 mi) long and 6 kilometres (4 mi) wide and lies at an elevation of 321 metres (1,053 ft). The primary inflows are (counterclockwise from the Pic River outflow): the Pout River at the southeast; an unnamed creek from Little McKay Lake at Yankee Bay at the north; and Sandlink Creek at Northeast Bay at the northeast. The primary outflow is the Pic River at Outlet Bay at the southeast tip of the lake, controlled by the McKay Lake Dam.

Big Island in the centre of the lake is surrounded by the North, Morrin, South and West Channels. Other named bays include Boot Bay and Portage Bay at the southwest and Reedy Bay at the east.
