= Kagiano River =

- Location of the mouth of the Kagiano River in Ontario

Location
- Country: Canada
- Province: Ontario
- Region: Northwestern Ontario
- District: Thunder Bay

Physical characteristics
- Source: Devork Lake
  - coordinates: 49°24′09″N 86°27′38″W
  - elevation: 337 m (1,106 ft)
- Mouth: Pic River
  - coordinates: 49°11′26″N 86°05′41″W
  - elevation: 211 m (692 ft)

Basin features
- River system: Great Lakes Basin
- Tributaries
  - left: Deerskull Creek; Palmquist Creek; Wort Creek; Marmota Creek; Pistol Creek; Fakeloo Creek
  - right: Gentian Creek; Buhl Creek

The Kagiano River is a river in the east part of Thunder Bay District in northwestern Ontario, Canada. It is in the Great Lakes Basin and flows from Devork Lake, 42 kilometres (26 mi) south of the community of Longlac on Ontario Highway 11, to the Pic River 55 kilometres (34 mi) north northeast of the town of Marathon on Ontario Highway 17.

== Course ==
The river begins at Devork Lake. It flows south, takes in the left tributary Deerskull Creek at Neotoma Lake and enters at the south end of Kagiano Lake. There, it takes in the right tributary Gentian Creek and left tributaries Palmquist Creek and Wort Creek. The river heads east out of the lake at the northeast end and controlled by a dam, takes in the right tributary Buhl Creek, then turns south. It takes in the left tributary Marmota Creek, reaches Solann Lake, turns east, and takes in the left tributary Pistol Creek. The river heads over Cedar Falls and Twin Falls, takes in the left tributary Fakeloo Creek and reaches its mouth at the Pic River. The Pic River flows to Lake Superior.

== Hydroelectricity development ==
Kagiano Power, owned by the Ojibways of the Pic River First Nation, operates a run-of-the-river hydroelectricity generating station on the river at Twin Falls just upstream of the river's mouth.

== Tributaries ==
- Fakeloo Creek (left)
- Pistol Creek (left)
- Marmota Creek (left)
- Buhl Creek (right)
- Kagiano Lake
  - Gentian Creek (right)
  - Palmquist Creek (left)
  - Wort Creek (left)
- Deerskull Creek (left)

== See also ==
- List of rivers of Ontario

== Sources ==
- "Topographic Map sheets 42E1, 42E2, 42E7, 42E8". Atlas of Canada. Natural Resources Canada. 2010-02-04. Archived from the original on 2010-08-03.
- Map 14 (PDF) (Map). 1 : 1,600,000. Official road map of Ontario. Ministry of Transportation of Ontario. 2014.
