= Daisy Hill =

Daisy Hill may refer to:

== Places ==
- Daisy Hill, Indiana, U.S.
- Daisy Hill, Queensland, Australia
- Daisy Hill, Victoria, Australia
- Daisy Hill, Greater Manchester, England
  - Daisy Hill railway station

== Other uses ==
- Daisy Hill F.C., an English football club
- Daisy Hill Hospital, in Newry, Northern Ireland
- Daisy Hill Puppy Farm, fictional character Snoopy's birthplace

== See also ==
- Daisy (disambiguation)
