= Rod Michano =

Canadian First Nations HIV/AIDS activist and educator

- Born: Toussaint Roderick Michano; April 19, 1964 (age 62); Thunder Bay, Ontario
- Occupations: educator, public speaker, social activist
- Years active: 1990–present (activist)
- Website: Official website

Rod Michano (born Toussaint Roderick Michano, April 19, 1964 in Thunder Bay, Ontario) is a noted Canadian First Nations HIV/AIDS activist and educator. He is a member of the Ojibways of the Pic River First Nation in Northern Ontario.

Michano left Pic River at age 18, travelling extensively throughout the United States and Canada before coming to Toronto, Ontario where he became active in many Aboriginal and LGBT community organizations. He began HIV/AIDS work and activism in 1990 and has since become a public speaker and educator. He has been involved in many grassroots initiatives that helped raise the profile of HIV/AIDS among Aboriginal, First Nations, Metis, and Inuit, and was featured in the 1997 documentary film Changing Faces of AIDS.

He resides in Toronto, Ontario, Canada, and was co-host of Toronto's 2007 AIDS Vigil.
