= Mary Quant =

British fashion designer and fashion icon (1930–2023)

Dame Mary Quant CH DBE FCSD RDI
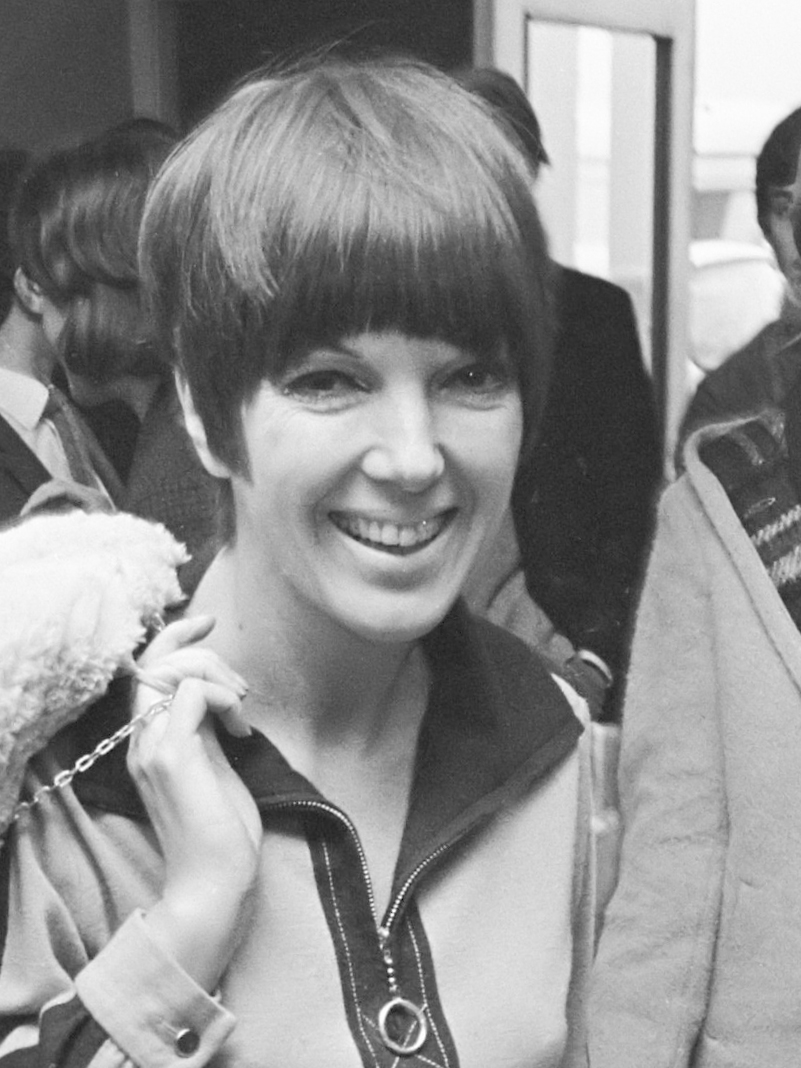
- Quant in 1966
- Born: Barbara Mary Quant; 11 February 1930; London, England
- Died: 13 April 2023 (aged 93); Surrey, England
- Other name: Barbara Mary Plunket Greene
- Education: Goldsmiths, University of London
- Label: Mary Quant
- Spouse: Alexander Plunket Greene (m. 1957; died 1990)
- Children: 1

Dame Barbara Mary Quant (11 February 1930 – 13 April 2023) (Note: The Mary Quant exhibition at the Victoria and Albert Museum in 2019–20 stated her year of birth as 1930, and that she became a student at Goldsmiths, University of London around 1950. However, the sleeve to her own autobiography (2012) gives the year as 1934, a date that has been widely cited over the years. Obituaries in April 2023 seemed universally to have accepted that she was 93 when she died: in other words, that she was born on 11 February 1930.) was a British fashion designer and icon. She became an instrumental figure in the 1960s London-based Mod and youth fashion movements, and played a prominent role in London's Swinging Sixties culture. She was one of the designers who took credit for the miniskirt and hotpants. Ernestine Carter wrote: "It is given to a fortunate few to be born at the right time, in the right place, with the right talents. In recent fashion there are three: Chanel, Dior, and Mary Quant."

== Early life ==
Quant was born in Woolwich, London, the daughter of Jack Quant and Mildred Jones. Her parents, who both came from Welsh mining families, had received scholarships to a grammar school and had been awarded first-class honours degrees at Cardiff University before moving to London to work as schoolteachers. She had a younger brother who became a dental officer in the Royal Air Force and with whom she was evacuated to Kent during the Second World War.

Quant attended Blackheath High School. For college, her desire had been to study fashion; although her parents dissuaded her from that course of study, and she instead studied illustration and art education at Goldsmiths, University of London for which she received a degree in 1953. In pursuit of her love for fashion, after finishing her degree, she was apprenticed to Erik Braagaard, a high-class Mayfair milliner on Brook Street next door to Claridge's Hotel.

== Fashion career ==
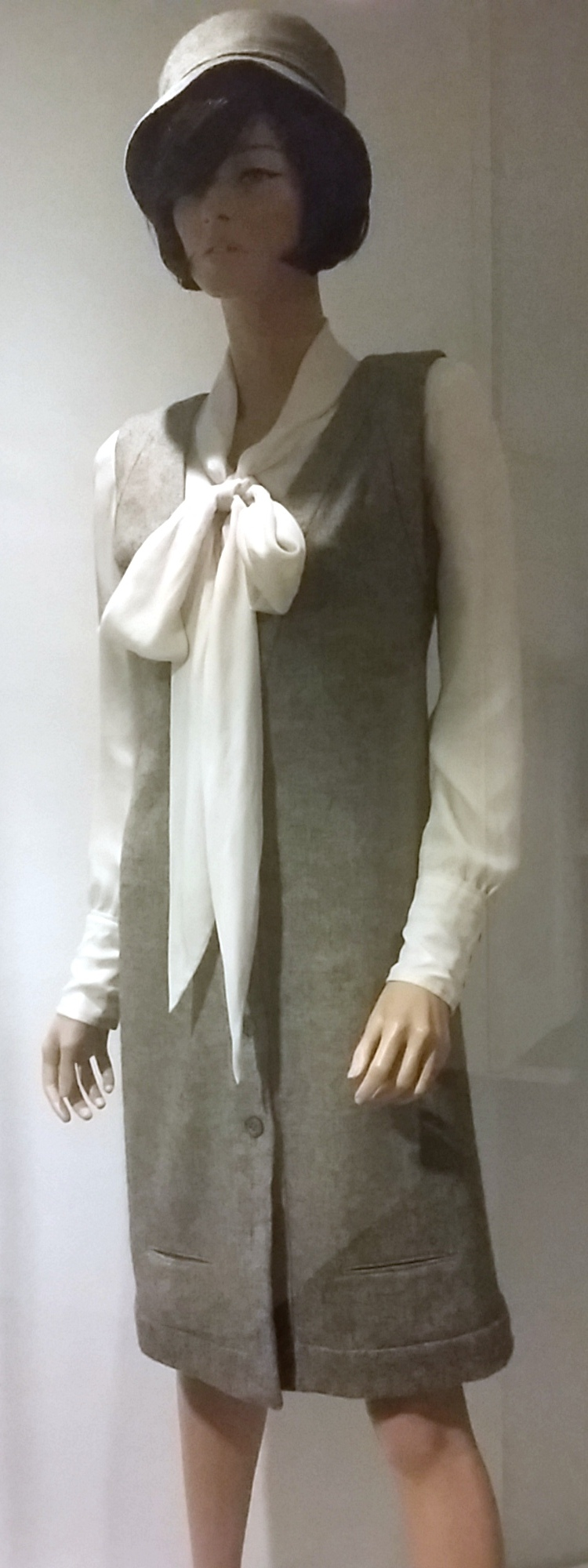
Mary Quant dress chosen as the Dress of the Year in 1963

Quant was introduced to Archie McNair, who owned a photography business on the King's Road, through a mutual friend. He and Alexander Plunket worked with Quant to purchase Markham House, the shopfront that would be the location of her clothing boutique, Bazaar. The two men both contributed financially to the project, and Markham House was purchased for £8,000. During the renovation, Quant worked to locate wholesale suppliers, with a salary of £5 per week. Once the shop opened, Quant initially sold clothing sourced from wholesalers in her new boutique in the King's Road. The bolder pieces in her collection started garnering more attention from media like Harper's Bazaar, and an American manufacturer purchased some of her dress designs. Because of this attention and her personal love for these bolder styles, she decided to take designs into her own hands. Initially working solo, she was soon employing a handful of machinists; by 1966 she was working with a total of 18 manufacturers. A self-taught designer inspired by the culture-forward "Chelsea Set" of artists and socialites, Quant's designs were riskier than standard styles of the time. Quant's designs revolutionised fashion from the utilitarian wartime standard of the late 1940s to the energy of the 1950s and 1960s' cultural shifts. She stocked her own original items in an array of colours and patterns, such as colourful tights.

Quant's impact did not just come from her unique designs; in her boutique she created a special environment, including music, drinks, and long hours that appealed to young adults. This environment was unique for the industry, as it differentiated from the stale department stores and inaccessible high-class designer store environments that had a hold of the fashion market. Her window displays with models in quirky poses brought a lot of attention to her boutique, where people would often stop to stare at the eccentric displays. She stated that "Within 10 days, we hardly had a piece of the original merchandise left."

For a while in the late 1950s and early 1960s, Quant was one of only two London-based high-class designers consistently offering youthful clothes for young people. The other was Kiki Byrne, who opened her boutique on the King's Road in direct competition with Quant.

In 1966, Quant was named one of the "fashion revolutionaries" in New York by Women's Wear Daily, alongside Edie Sedgwick, Tiger Morse, Pierre Cardin, Paco Rabanne, Rudi Gernreich, André Courrèges, Emanuel Ungaro, Yves Saint Laurent and Baby Jane Holzer.

=== Quant and the miniskirt ===
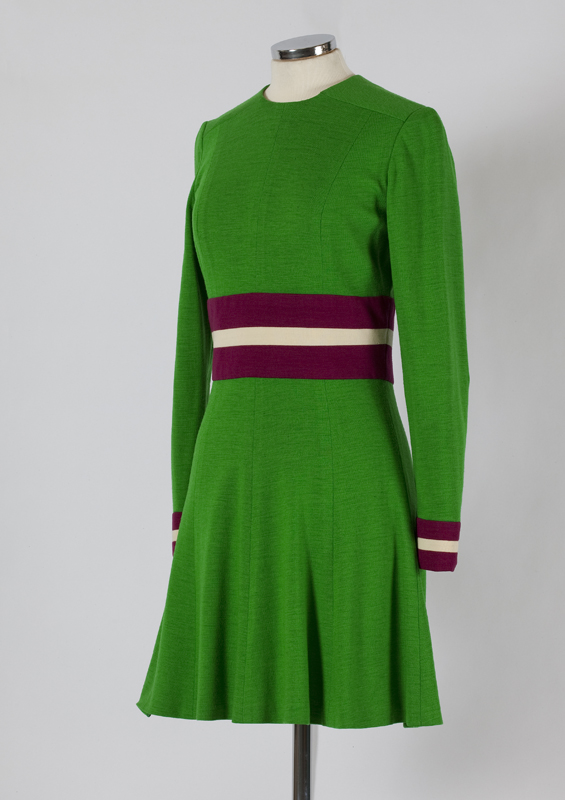
Jersey minidress by Mary Quant, late 1960s

The miniskirt, described as one of the defining fashions of the 1960s, is one of the garments most widely associated with Quant. While she is often cited as the inventor of the style, this claim has been challenged by others. Marit Allen, a contemporary fashion journalist and editor of the influential "Young Ideas" pages for UK Vogue, firmly stated that another British fashion designer, John Bates, rather than Quant or André Courrèges, was the original creator of the miniskirt. Others credit Courrèges with the invention of the style.

However, skirts had been getting shorter since the 1950s, and had reached the knee by the early sixties, but "Quant wanted them higher so they would be less restricting—they allowed women to run for a bus ... and were much, much sexier".

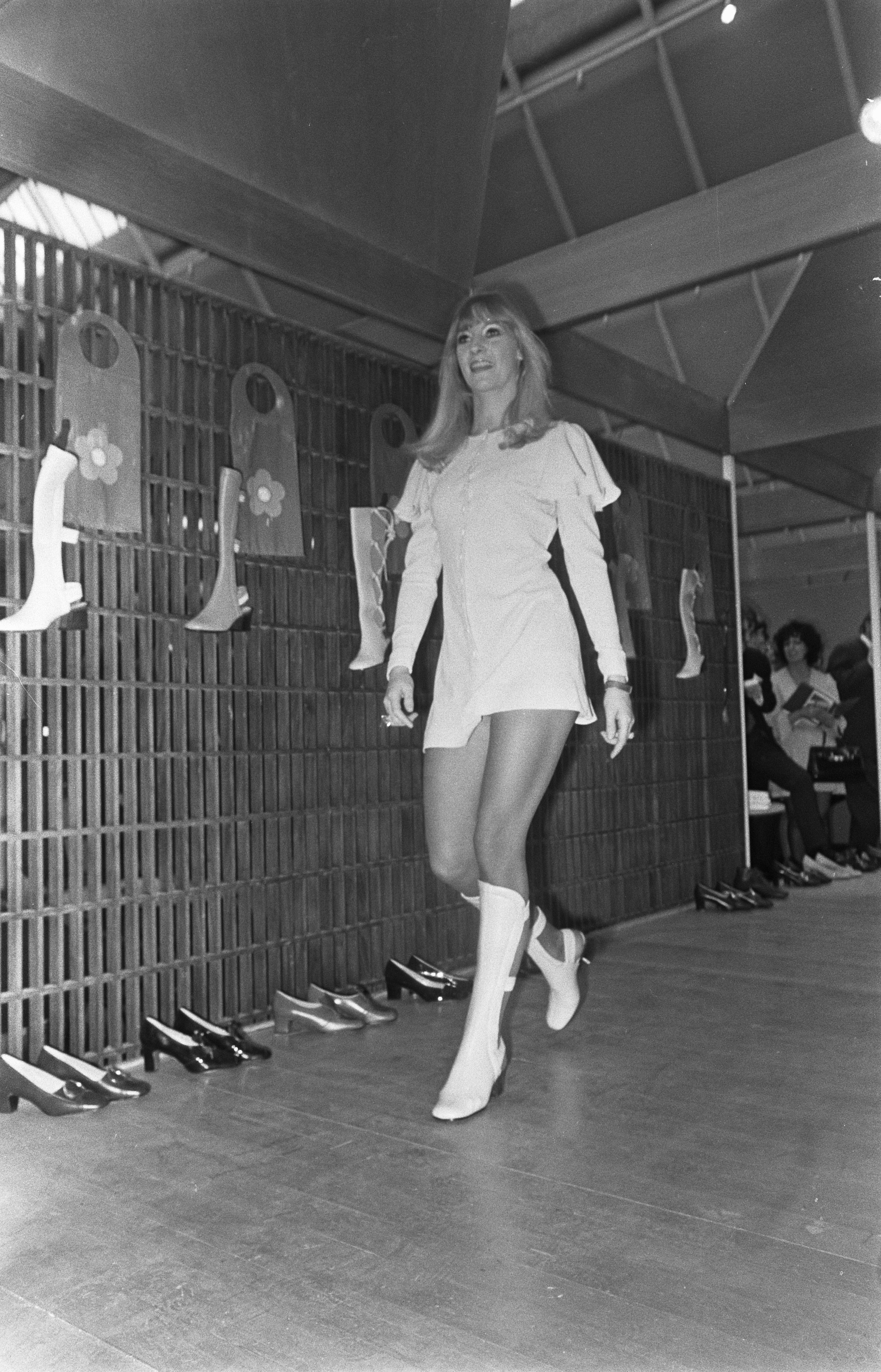
Mary Quant minidress at a 1969 fashion show in the Netherlands

Quant later said: "It was the girls on the King's Road [during the "Swinging London" scene] who invented the miniskirt. I was making easy, youthful, simple clothes, in which you could move, in which you could run and jump and we would make them the length the customer wanted. I wore them very short and the customers would say, 'Shorter, shorter.'" She gave the miniskirt its name, after her favourite make of car, the Mini, and said of its wearers: "They are curiously feminine, but their femininity lies in their attitude rather than in their appearance ... She enjoys being noticed, but wittily. She is lively—positive—opinionated." The fashion model Twiggy popularised the miniskirt abroad.

In addition to the miniskirt, Quant is often credited with inventing the coloured and patterned tights that tended to accompany the garment, although their creation is also attributed to the Spanish couturier Cristóbal Balenciaga, who offered harlequin-patterned tights in 1962, or to John Bates or Jenny Elphinstone (nee Price) an art student at Guildford College of Art who also fashioned matching knickers for very short mini dresses.

== Later career ==
In the late 1960s, Quant offered miniskirts that were the forerunner of hotpants and became a British fashion icon. In 1967, she designed berets in twelve colours for British headwear company Kangol. Quant's berets, featuring her daisy logo, are in her collection at the Victoria and Albert Museum. Through the 1970s and 1980s she concentrated on household goods and make-up rather than just her clothing lines, including the duvet, which she claimed to have invented.

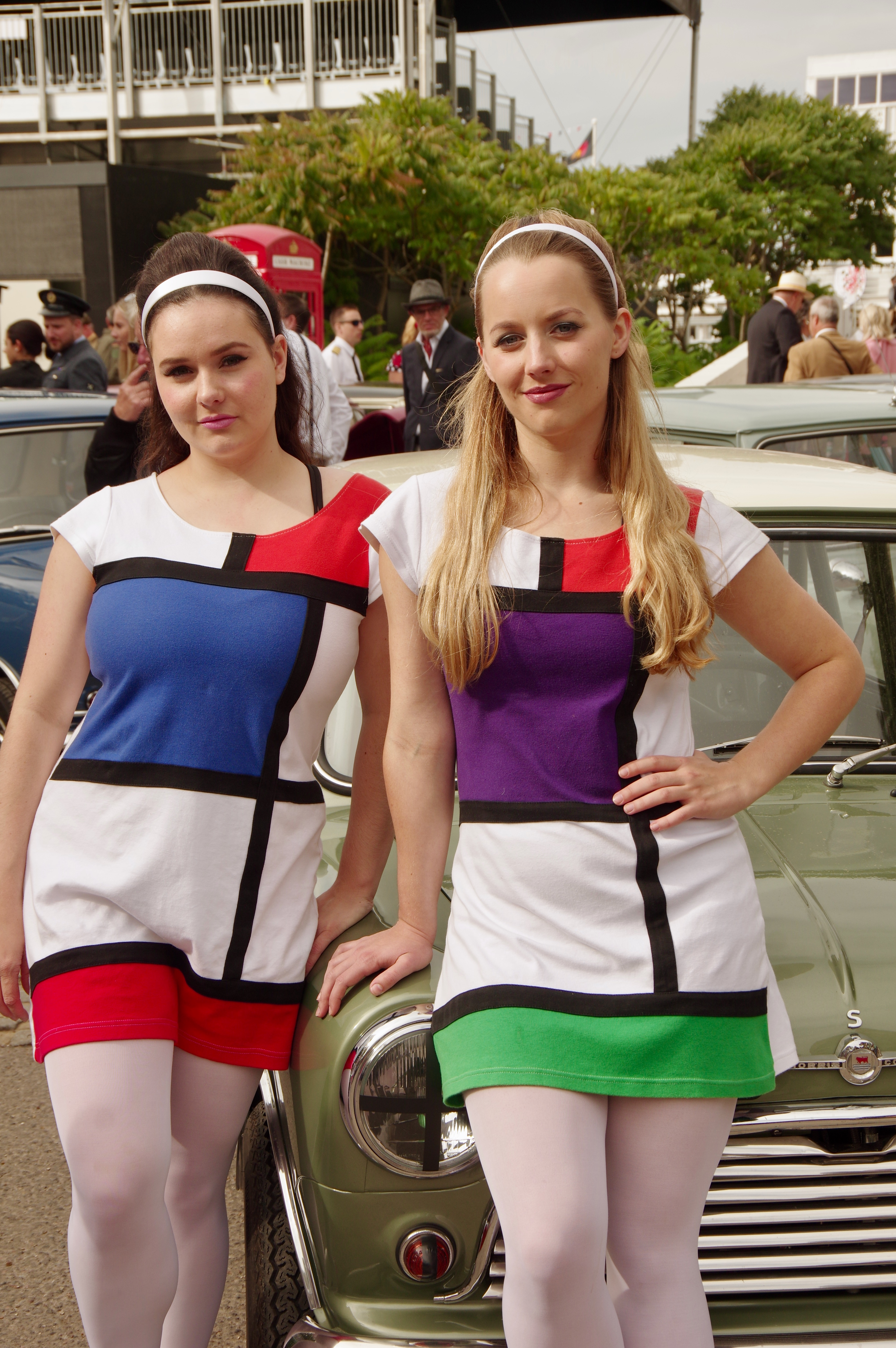
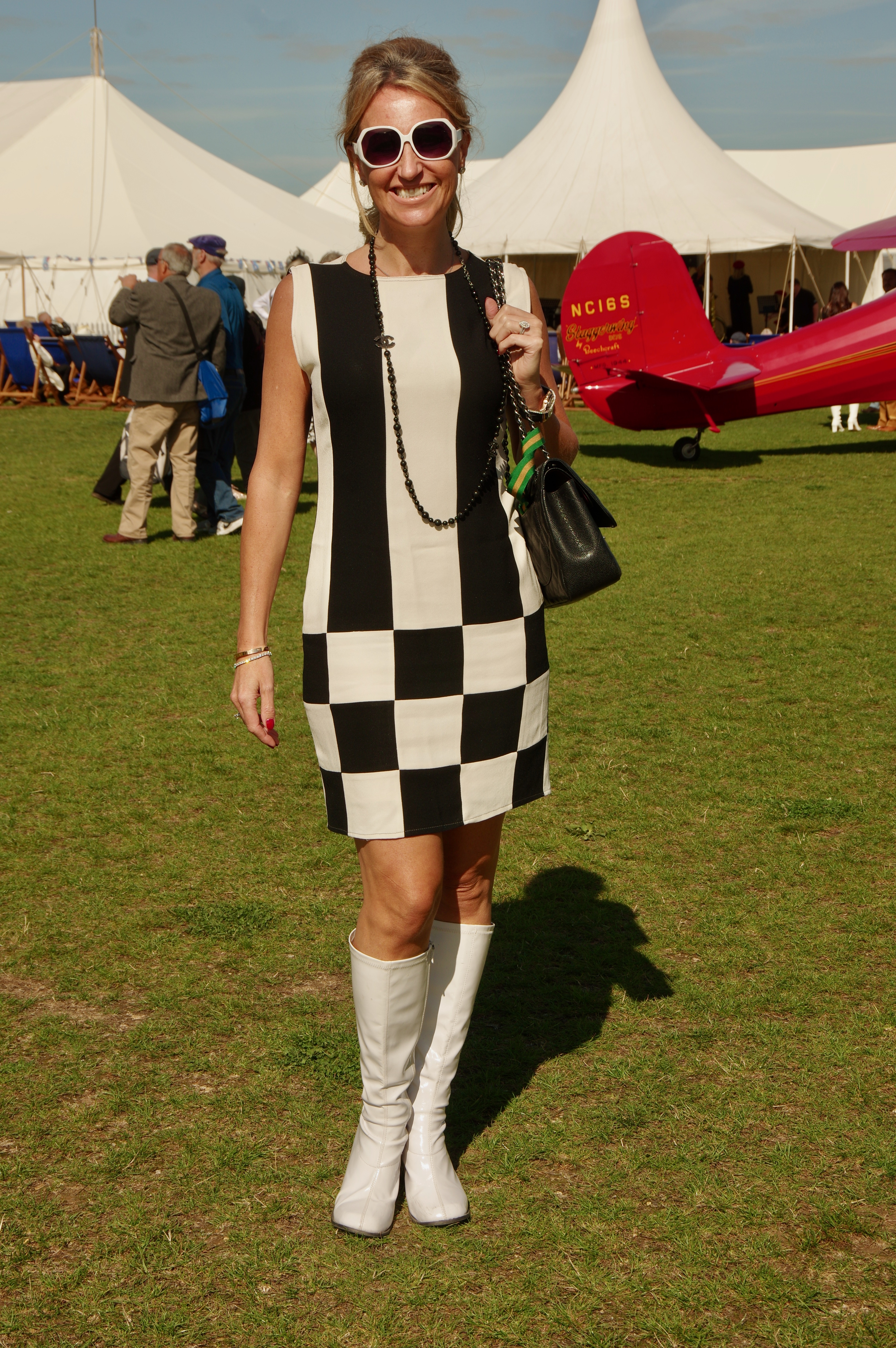
Classic Mary Quant dresses exhibited at the 2019 Goodwood Revival motor racing festival in England

In 1988, Quant designed the interior of the Mini (1000) Designer (originally dubbed the Mini Quant, the name was changed when popularity charts were set against having Quant's name on the car). It featured black-and-white striped seats with red trimming. The seatbelts were red, and the driving and passenger seats had Quant's signature on the upper left quadrant. The steering-wheel had Quant's signature daisy and the bonnet badge had "Mary Quant" written over the signature name. The headlight housings, wheel arches, door handles and bumpers were all "nimbus grey", rather than the more common chrome or black finishes. Two thousand were released in the UK on 15 June 1988, and a number were also released on to foreign markets; however, the numbers for these are hard to come by. The special edition Mini came in two body colours, jet black and diamond white.

In 2000, she resigned as director of Mary Quant Ltd, her cosmetics company, after a Japanese buy-out. There are more than 200 Mary Quant Colour shops in Japan.

== Personal life ==
Quant met her future husband and business partner, Alexander Plunket Greene, grandson of the Irish singer Harry Plunket Greene, in 1953. They were married from 1957 until his death in 1990, and had a son.

Quant died at home in Surrey on 13 April 2023, aged 93.

== Honours and recognition ==
"She was the godmother of the youth movement in fashion, the first to realise that how women dressed needed to change."

— Jenny Lister, curator of textiles and fashion at the V&A

In 1963, Quant was the first winner of the Dress of the Year award. In the 1966 Birthday Honours she was appointed Officer of the Order of the British Empire (OBE). She arrived at Buckingham Palace to accept the award in a cream wool jersey minidress with blue facings. In 1990, she won the Hall of Fame Award of the British Fashion Council. She was appointed Dame Commander of the Order of the British Empire (DBE) in the 2015 New Year Honours for services to British fashion. She was appointed Member of the Order of the Companions of Honour (CH) in the 2023 New Year Honours for services to fashion.

Quant received an honorary doctorate from Heriot-Watt University in 2006. In 2009, the miniskirt designed by Quant was selected by the Royal Mail for their "British Design Classics" commemorative postage stamp issue. In 2012, she was among the British cultural icons selected by artist Sir Peter Blake to appear in a new version of his most famous artwork – the Beatles' Sgt. Pepper's Lonely Hearts Club Band album cover – to celebrate the British cultural figures of his lifetime.

Quant was a fellow of the Chartered Society of Designers, and winner of the Minerva Medal, the society's highest award.

In the 1966 Donovan song "Sunny South Kensington", Quant and Jean-Paul Belmondo's drug use/abuse is immortalised in the lyric "Jean-Paul Belmondo and-a Mary Quant got stoned, to say the least".

Quant is referenced in the song “Blow Away” by Jobriath from his 1973 self titled album on Elektra Records. As well as the musical number "This Is What We Want" in the 2014 stage musical Made in Dagenham, based on the 2010 film of the same name.

== Bibliography ==
- Quant, Mary; Green, Felicity (1984). Colour by Quant. Treasure. ISBN 978-1-85051-265-3.
- Quant, Mary; Barrymore, Maureen; King, Dave (1996). Classic Make-up & Beauty. DK Living Series. DK Pub. ISBN 978-0-7894-3294-0.
- Quant, Mary (1996). Quant by Quant: The Autobiography of Mary Quant. Harry N. Abrams. ISBN 978-1-85177-958-1.
- Quant, Mary (1996). Ultimate Make-up & Beauty. Firefly Books, Limited. ISBN 978-1-55209-080-0.
- Quant, Mary (2011). Mary Quant Autobiography. Headline. ISBN 978-0-7553-6338-4.

== See also ==
- Daisy, doll designed by Quant
