= Devork Lake =

Lake in Ontario, Canada

- Location in Ontario
- Location: Thunder Bay District, Ontario
- Coordinates: 49°24′46″N 86°26′41″W
- Part of: Great Lakes Basin
- Primary outflows: Kagiano River
- Basin countries: Canada
- Max. length: 2.75 km (1.71 mi)
- Max. width: .5 km (0.31 mi)
- Surface elevation: 337 m (1,106 ft)

Devork Lake is a lake in the east part of Thunder Bay District in northwestern Ontario, Canada. It is in the Great Lakes Basin, lies 38 kilometres (24 mi) south of the community of Longlac on Ontario Highway 11, and is the source of the Kagiano River. The lake drains via the Kagiano and the Pic River to Lake Superior.
