= Biigtigong Nishnaabeg =

Pic River 50
- Indian reserve
- Pic River Indian Reserve No. 50
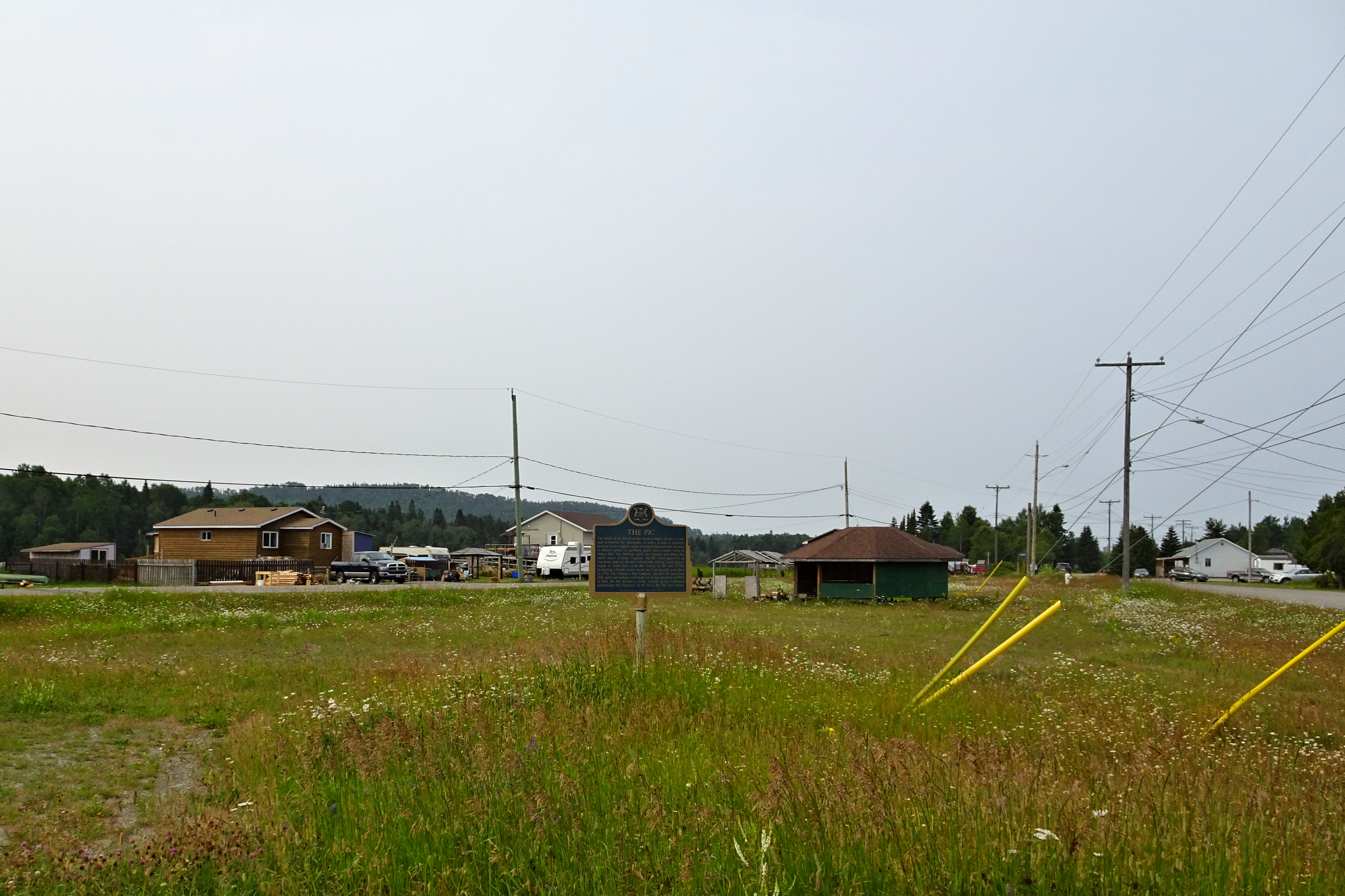

- Location within Ontario
- Coordinates: 48°38′N 86°16′W
- Country: Canada
- Province: Ontario
- District: Thunder Bay
- First Nation: Biigtigong Nishnaabeg

Area
  - Land: 3.65 km^{2} (1.41 sq mi)

Population (2011)
  - Total: 395
  - Density: 108.3/km^{2} (280/sq mi)
- Website: www.picriver.com

Biigtigong Nishnaabeg is an Ojibway (Anishinaabe) First Nation on the northern shore of Lake Superior. It is sometimes referred to as Ojibways of the Pic River First Nation (or "Pic River" for short). Pic River is not a signatory to the Robinson Superior treaty; however, they did petition, starting in 1879, for a reserve and the request was subsequently granted. The community is located on the northern shore of Lake Superior at the mouth of the Pic River 316.6-hectare (782-acre) and is called Pic River 50. In November 2007, their total registered population was 964 people, of which their on-reserve population was 480.

== History ==
The mouth of the Pic River has been a centre of native trade and settlement for thousands of years. It was a strategic location in the region's water transportation network because it offered access to northern lands and a canoe route to James Bay. The halfway point for canoers travelling the north shore of Lake Superior, "the Pic" first appeared on European maps in the mid-seventeenth century.

Local First Nations peoples traded furs with the French as early as the 1770s. A French fur trader set up a permanent post around 1792. The Hudson's Bay Company set up a permanent post in 1821 until encroaching settlement let to its relocation in 1888. In 1914, their Pic River 50 became a treaty-established reserve.

== Reserve ==
Pic River 50 is an Indian reserve on the north shore of Lake Superior at the mouth of the Pic River, near Marathon, Ontario, Canada. The reserve is 316.6 ha within its exterior boundaries, and serves as the land-base for the Ojibways of the Pic River First Nation. In November, 2007, the First Nation reported their total registered population was 964 people, of which their on-reserve population was 480.

Pic River 50 is known for the role it has played in developing "run of the river" hydroelectric projects in Northern Ontario. It is partner to three projects: the 13.5 MW Wawatay generating station (GS) on the Black River, the 5.0 MW Twin Falls GS and the 23.0 MW Umbata Falls GS. In all, these projects produce enough electricity to meet the needs of some 30,000 homes in Ontario.

Ojibways of the Pic River First Nation are working to develop employment, education and local resources within the reserve. Pic River 50 has a forestry company, a cable television company and a high-speed internet company.

The Pic River 50 reserve is home to many wild Northern Ontario species such as the beaver, moose, woodland caribou, wolf, black bear, white tailed and red tailed hawk, bald eagle, northern flicker, and many arctic alpine plants. The shores of Pic River 50 are dominated by the mass sandy dunes on the Little Pic river, which translates to "little muddy."

== Culture ==
Pic River hosts an annual pow wow in mid July. The First Nation is active in economic and workforce development, with interests in run-of-the-river hydroelectric generating plants on the Kagiano River and Black River (Wawatay Generating Station).

== Governance ==
The current electoral leadership of the council consists of Chief Duncan Michano and 11 councillors. Their four-year term began on October 30, 2021.

== Notable people ==
- Rod Michano, a prominent HIV/AIDS awareness activist among First Nations in Canada.

== In literature ==
The Voyageur, by Paul Carlucci, features some Nishnaabe characters.
