= Kiki Byrne =

Norwegian-born British fashion designer

- Kiki Byrne in the 1960s
- Born: Olaug Juliane Grinaker; 18 April 1937; Trondheim, Norway
- Died: 3 April 2013 (aged 75)
- Education: Harrow College of Art
- Label: Kiki Byrne
- Spouses: Nicky Byrne (div. 1963) Stephen Milne (m. 1971)

Kiki Byrne (18 April 1937 – 3 April 2013) was a Norwegian-born, London-based fashion designer who is mainly remembered as Mary Quant's rival on the King's Road in the late 1950s and 1960s.

== Early life ==
Born Olaug Juliane Grinaker, but known as Kiki throughout her life, she was the eldest of three sisters growing up on a farm in Norway during the German occupation. In her mid-teens she moved to London, where she studied at Harrow College of Art. After this, she met her first husband Nicky Byrne, who also acted as her business manager. After selling some of her early designs through Mary Quant's boutique Bazaar, Kiki set up her own boutique in Sloane Street, in collaboration with her husband. Some sources suggest that this boutique was called Glass & Black, although extant Kiki Byrne garments are labelled Kiki Byrne.

== Fashion ==
Following its initial success, the Byrnes moved Kiki Byrne to new premises on the King's Road. Byrne and Mary Quant were remembered as the "first people to make clothes for young people". Their designs offered a young alternative to the mature styles then being produced by high fashion designers. Byrne told The Sydney Morning Herald in 1958 that "only Midlands businessmen's wives can afford Michael and Hartnell". Also in 1958, Byrne collaborated with the photographer Tony Armstrong on a ski-wear collection that was featured in Vogue.

Byrne was known for very simple, youthful little black dresses and unfussy suits made with good quality fabrics in neutral tones such as beige, which appealed to the likes of Susannah York, Grace Coddington, and Christine Keeler, and also to glamorous actresses and models such as Kay Kendall and Barbara Goalen. She also made a white trapeze-line dress for Lady Antonia Fraser to wear to Royal Ascot in 1958, enabling her to be photographed while concealing her pregnancy. Although Byrne described her clothes as "exclusive clothes – at reasonable prices", Barbara Hulanicki, who went on to launch the original Biba boutique, remembered that one of Byrne's black dresses cost 20 guineas, which she thought quite expensive. Hulanicki would later recall how excited she and her friends were to discover Byrne designing the kind of nice, simple, youthful garments that they wanted to wear, but had difficulty finding.

Byrne's designs, along with those of Foale & Tuffin, Sonia Rykiel, Quant, and Biba, were worn by the famously trendy Cathy McGowan on her influential music show Ready Steady Go!

Following the closure of Kiki Byrne in the mid-1960s, when it was bought out by Jaeger, Kiki designed for other labels including Frank Usher.

== Costume design ==
Alongside the fashion work, Byrne had success as a film costume designer. She created the golden bikini worn by Margaret Nolan in the title sequence of the 1964 James Bond film Goldfinger, which was art-directed by her then-boyfriend, Robert Brownjohn. Other films which she costumed included Fathom (1967), Perfect Friday (1970), and, with Gina Fratini, Stop the World – I Want to Get Off (1966).

== Later life ==
Following the breakdown of her first marriage, Byrne was in a long-term relationship with Brownjohn which ended shortly before his sudden death in 1970. In 1971, she married the journalist Stephen Milne.

Byrne died on 3 April 2013. She was survived by her second husband and two daughters.
