= Black River (Thunder Bay District) =

- Location of the mouth of the Black River in Ontario

Location
- Country: Canada
- Province: Ontario
- Region: Northwestern Ontario
- District: Thunder Bay

Physical characteristics
- Source: Unnamed lake
  - coordinates: 49°15′30″N 85°34′28″W
  - elevation: 366 m (1,201 ft)
- Mouth: Pic River
  - coordinates: 48°37′41″N 86°15′49″W
  - elevation: 186 m (610 ft)

Basin features
- River system: Great Lakes Basin

The Black River is a river in Thunder Bay District in Northwestern Ontario, Canada. It is part of the Great Lakes Basin, and is a left tributary of the Pic River.

== Course ==
The river begins at an unnamed lake and heads southwest through geographic Nickle Township into the municipality of Manitouwadge to Agonzon Lake. It exits the lake over a dam east, then resumes a southwest course, passes under Ontario Highway 614, through geographic Lecours Township, then under Ontario Highway 17 and the Canadian Pacific Railway main line. The river enters geographic Pic Township, passes over the Wawatay Generating Station and dam, takes in the left tributary Little Black River, and reaches its mouth at the Pic River, across from the Ojibways of the Pic River First Nation Pic River 50 reserve and just above that river's mouth at Lake Superior.

Ontario Highway 614 follows the river valley from Ontario Highway 17 to Manitouwadge.

== Tributaries ==
- Little Black River (left)
- Melgund Creek (left)
- Swede Creek (right)
- Gowan Creek (right)
- Valley Creek (right)
- Cedar Creek (left)
- Amwri Creek (left)
- Namebin Creek (right)
- Barehead Creek (right)
- Jenny Creek (left)
- Ziziginiga Creek (left)
- Morley Creek (left)
- Fox Creek (right)
- Lorne Creek (left)

== See also ==
- List of rivers of Ontario

== Sources ==
- Map 14 (PDF) (Map). 1 : 1,600,000. Official road map of Ontario. Ministry of Transportation of Ontario. 2014.
- Restructured municipalities - Ontario map #2 (Map). Restructuring Maps of Ontario. Ontario Ministry of Municipal Affairs and Housing. 2006. Archived from the original on 2014-04-10.
