= Pic River =

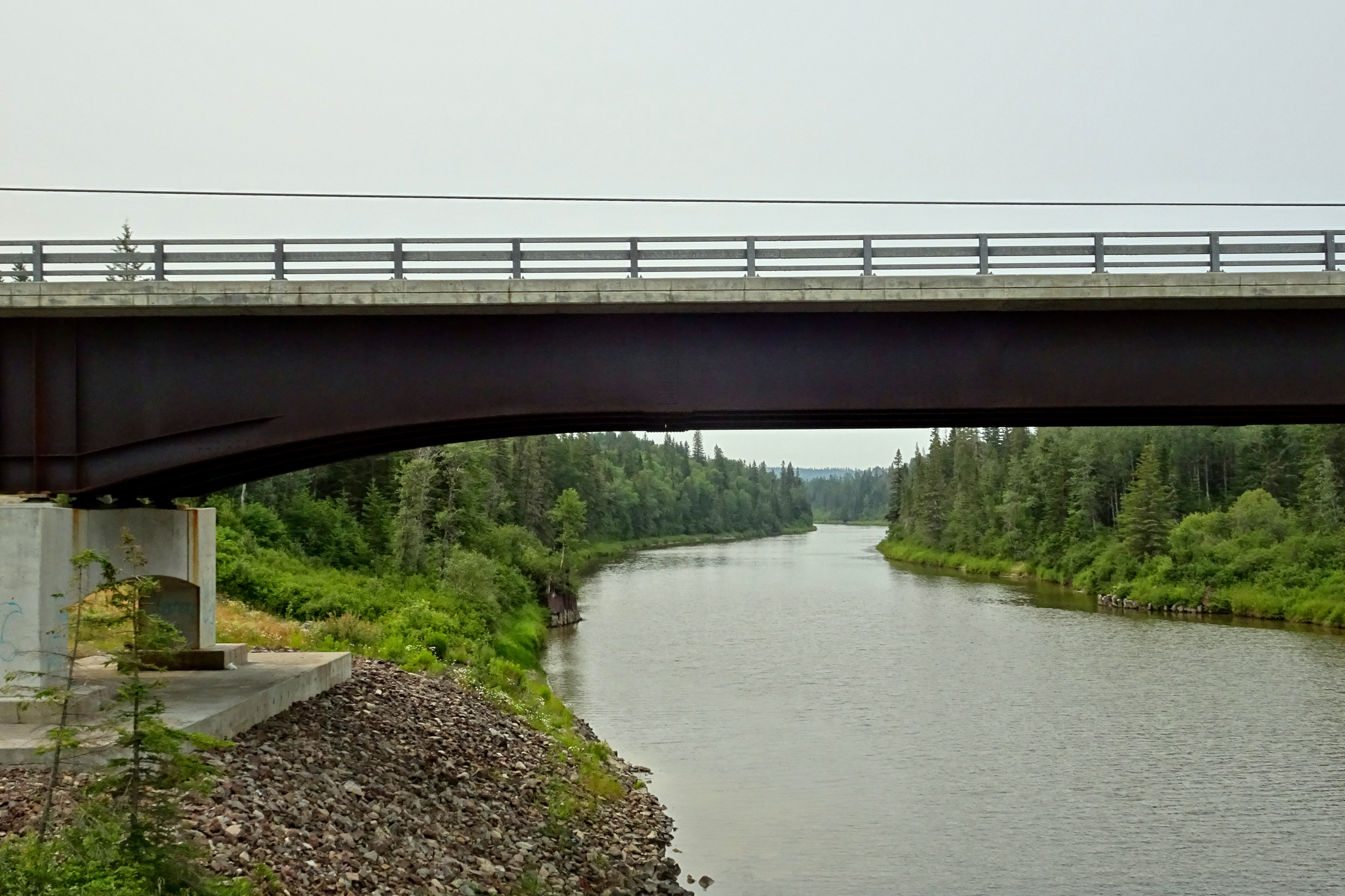
- Bridge of Highway 17 over the Pic River

- Location of the mouth of the Pic River in Ontario

Location
- Country: Canada
- Province: Ontario
- Region: Northwestern Ontario
- District: Thunder Bay

Physical characteristics
- Source: McKay Lake
  - coordinates: 49°37′42″N 86°17′00″W
  - elevation: 321 m (1,053 ft)
- Mouth: Lake Superior
  - coordinates: 48°36′01″N 86°18′09″W
  - elevation: 180 m (590 ft)
- Length: 150 km (93 mi)

Basin features
- Tributaries
  - left: Black River, White Otter River
  - right: Kagiano River

The Pic River is a river in the east part of Thunder Bay District in northwestern Ontario, Canada. It flows from McKay Lake southeast of the community of Longlac and empties into Lake Superior southeast of the town of Marathon.

== Course ==
The river begins at an elevation of 321 metres (1,053 ft) at Outlet Bay at the southeast of McKay Lake, about 10 kilometres (6 mi) west of the community of Caramat and 3 kilometres (1.9 mi) southwest of the Canadian National Railway mainline, flowing south out of the lake over McKay Lake Dam. It heads over the Bigrock Rapids to Sagiwatan Lake, then further south over the Deadman Rapids to Waboosekon Lake. The river passes out of the lake over Waboosekon Lake Dam, turns southeast, passes over the High Falls and Middle Falls, and takes in the left tributary White Otter River.

The Pic heads south over the Manitou Falls and takes in the right tributary Kagiano River. It continues south, passes under Ontario Highway 17 and enters the Pic River 50 Indian reserve of the Ojibways of the Pic River First Nation. The Pic River passes their community of Heron Bay, where it is crossed by the Canadian Pacific Railway mainline, takes in the left tributary Black River, passes the Ojibways of the Pic River First Nation community of Pic River, and reaches its mouth at Lake Superior. A beach and system of sand dunes are found at the mouth.

== History ==
Fort Pic was a trading post founded in 1789 by Gabriel Cotté in partnership with John Grant and Maurice-Régis Blondeau. Its greatest prosperity was in 1799-1815 under Baptiste Perreault, In 1805 there were 16 men, 2 women and 3 children in the fort and 148 Indigenous people in the vicinity. Louis Agassiz visited in 1847. After 1865 only a minimal operation was maintained. It was abandoned in 1914. The site was on the west bank about 150 yards above the river mouth on a flat 16 feet above the normal water level. A lumber camp was built here in 1930. Archaeologists found traces of the fort in 1964. The well, which is still in use, appears to be the original one. There is a government marker.

In later years the Pic was used to transport 8 foot pulp logs to Heron Bay, where they were assembled in booms and towed to Marathon. Marathon Paper operated a pulp mill at Marathon using timber that was driven down the Pic each spring. The Marathon Corporation was purchased by American Can, and in 1982 by the James River Paper Company. The Pic river drive was phased out and trucks were employed in lieu of the water based system that was in place for many years. The woodlands that furnished wood for the mill at Marathon were delineated by the Pic watershed. In the early years woodsmen walked from Marathon after their hire, following trails blazed along the Pic river to camps built to provide wood for the mill. Walkers went from the mill to the camps taking mail and gathering statistics on wood cut and hauled by horses to the river. During the early years all wood was 'driven' in the spring, down the Pic and White Otter rivers. In later years roads supplanted the trails, but until 1982 there was a Camp near the White Otter River operated by American Can. Dynamite caches were located at strategic places along the river so that log jams could be cleared.

== Etymology ==
Two possibilities exist for the origin of the name of the river. It may be from either Ojibwe bikodinaa or French meaning "be a high ground" for the promontory found at the mouth of the river, or from the corruption of the Ojibwe "pekatek" or "mud", which describes its silty water.

== Hydroelectricity development ==
Small scale hydroelectricity developments have been proposed for sites at High Falls and Manitou Falls by the Ojibways of the Pic River First Nation. These would tie in to the transmission line from an existing development on the Kagiano River at Twin Falls, a development just upstream of that river's mouth with the Pic River.

== Tributaries ==
- Black River
- Camp 14 Creek (right)
- Spruce Creek (left)
- Goodchild Creek (left)
- Lacobeer Creek (right)
- Jim Creek (right)
- Little Joe Creek (right)
- Huck Creek (right)
- Cirrus Creek (left)
- Dewey Creek (right)
- Nama Creek (left)
- Slingshot Creek (left)
- Kagiano River (right)
- White Otter River (left)
- Hagarty Creek (left)
- Deadman Creek (right)
- Dianthus Creek (right)
- Kaboosa Creek (left)
- Bluejay Creek (left)
- Mustela Creek (right)
- Bambino Creek (right)

== See also ==
- List of rivers of Ontario

== Sources ==
- "Pic River". Geographical Names Data Base. Natural Resources Canada.
- "Topographic Map sheets 42D9, 42D16, 42E1, 42E8, 42E9". Atlas of Canada. Natural Resources Canada. 2010-02-04.
