= Archie McNair =

Archibald Alister Jourdan McNair (16 December 1919 – 2 July 2015) was a British lawyer and entrepreneur, who created four businesses central to the growth of King's Road in Chelsea, London as a style centre in the 1950s and 1960s.

McNair was born in Tiverton, Devon, the second of six children of Janie-Grace Jourdan and Donald McNair, who worked for a McNair family business making tyre-repair kits. He was educated at Blundell's School, Tiverton.

McNair trained as a solicitor in Exeter, and after Second World War military service as a pilot on an Auxiliary Fire Service boat, joined a legal firm in the City of London.

McNair established the Alister Jourdan photographic studio at 128 King's Road, where the team included Antony Armstrong-Jones (later Lord Snowdon, and husband of Princess Margaret), and on the ground floor, London's first espresso bar outside Soho, the Fantasie. At 138 King's Road he helped Mary Quant set up her first fashion boutique, Bazaar, with Alexander's Restaurant, run by her husband Alexander Plunket Greene in the basement.

In 1954, he married Catherine Fleming (died 2014), and they had a son, Hamish, and a daughter.
