= Daisy Systems (disambiguation) =

Daisy Systems is a computer-aided engineering company.

Daisy Systems is also the name of:

- Daisy Systems GmbH, a German subsidiary of Daisy Systems
- Daisy Systems Holland, a Dutch printer company
