= Daisy Swamp =

Swamp in South Carolina, United States

Coordinates: 33°02′24″N 80°04′09″W

Daisy Swamp is a swamp in Berkeley County, South Carolina, in the United States.

Daisy Swamp was named for the Deas family of landowners.
