= Daisy (steamboat) =

1880 steamboat in United States

History
- Name: Daisy
- Route: Puget Sound, Skagit River
- In service: 1880
- Out of service: 1897
- Identification: U.S. Registry #157006
- Fate: Sank near Edmonds, WA

General characteristics
- Type: Inland steamboat
- Tonnage: 97.87 regist.
- Length: 80.5 ft (24.54 m)
- Beam: 20.3 ft (6.19 m)
- Depth: 4.9 ft (1.49 m) depth of hold
- Installed power: twin steam engines, horizontally mounted; 40 indicated horsepower
- Propulsion: sternwheel

Daisy was a sternwheel steamboat that ran on Puget Sound and the Skagit River from 1880 to 1897.

== Career ==
Daisy was built at Seattle for the Washington Steamboat Company in 1880. The vessel was placed in service for the Skagit River trade. In 1897 Daisy sank near Edmonds, Washington, or on 12 October burned near Clinton, Washington.
