= Daisy Lake (Northwest Territories) =

- Location within Northwest Territories
- Location: South Slave, Canada
- Coordinates: 62°30′44″N 109°26′15″W
- Type: Lake
- Max. length: 13.3 km (8.3 mi)
- Max. width: 2.3 km (1.4 mi)
- Surface elevation: 356 m (1,168 ft)

Daisy Lake is a lake in the Arctic Ocean and Great Slave Lake drainage basins in South Slave Region, Northwest Territories, Canada.

The lake is about 13.3 kilometres (8 mi) long and 2.3 kilometres (1 mi) wide, lies at an elevation of 356 metres (1,168 ft), and is located about 30 kilometres (19 mi) southeast of the settlement of Fort Reliance on McLeod Bay, the large easternmost bay of Great Slave Lake. It is also just southeast of the McDonald Fault.

The primary inflow is an unnamed creek at the northeast, and the primary outflow is an unnamed creek at the southeast that empties into Dion Lake, whose waters in turn flow via Robert Lake and the Snowdrift River to Great Slave Lake at the community of Lutselk'e.
