= Princess Daisy (disambiguation) =

Princess Daisy is a fictional character in Nintendo's Mario franchise.

Princess Daisy may also refer to:

- Princess Daisy (novel), 1980 novel by Judith Krantz
- Princess Daisy (miniseries), 1983 TV miniseries based on Krantz's novel
- Daisy, Princess of Pless (1873–1943), British-born socialite and German princess
- Princess Margaret of Connaught (1882–1920), nicknamed Daisy
