= DayZ =

DayZ or Dayz may refer to:

- DayZ (mod), a mod for the 2009 video game Arma 2
- DayZ (video game), a standalone game derived from the aforementioned mod
- Dayz (Nissan), a rebadged version of the Mitsubishi eK car
