= Daisy (doll) =

Toy doll designed by Mary Quant

Daisy was a 1970s doll designed by British fashion designer Mary Quant.

== Design ==
Dashing Daisy Ice Queen (65703) in original box

Daisy was released in the UK in 1973, with the tag line "Mary Quant makes Daisy the best dressed doll in the world". Her name was a reference to Mary Quant's logo, a daisy flower. The doll was manufactured in the 1970s in Hong Kong by Model Toys Ltd, in connection with Flair Toys Ltd. Flair Toys Ltd went out of business in 1980, but Daisy continued to be manufactured until 1983.

The doll is 23 centimetres (9 inches) tall and there are three different versions of her: "Dizzy Daisy", who has a stiff body and unbendable legs, with just her arms and legs swinging up and down from the hips and shoulders; a basic bodied version with bendable legs, as well as the swivelling arms and leg joints; and an active version called "Dashing Daisy", whose body is the most bendable. Her hair colour has ranged from different shades of blond to brunette and red.

Other dolls were manufactured from the same moulds: "Havoc, Super Agent" was released in 1976; and Daisy's best friend, "Amy", who was only available by redeeming daisy tokens from Daisy packages.

== Clothes ==
Daisy's clothes were designed by Mary Quant and there are hundreds of different models. The doll and its accessories were sold in ordinary local shops. The clothes were cutting-edge 1970s design, as would be expected of Mary Quant, one of Britains leading fashion designers and inventor of the mini skirt and hot pants. Materials included satin, for long evening gowns and flared pants, stretch jersey nylon/polyester for T-shirts, fake "fun fur" for jackets and matching hats, and denim for jeans, waistcoats, hats, skirts and even a boiler suit (very fashionable at the time). Cotton was used extensively for all manner of outfits, long gypsy style dresses, again highly fashionable, blouses, tabards, mini dresses, etc. Patterns were also cutting-edge fashion, including flowers, stripes and polka dots. Footwear included platform clogs and sandals in every colour, and go-go boots with the Quant daisy on the side.

== House ==
Daisy had her own house, a fold-up country cottage with one room divided by a split level floor for the bedroom area, and a sloped roof, printed inside with windows and wallpaper and outside with stone walls, windows and greenery. Furniture included round 1970s-style kitchen table and chairs, white with pedestal bases which were based on the Eero Saarinen "Tulip" chairs and table, it had a complete set of crockery and cutlery, plus a bowl of flowers, napkins and two paper table cloths. Daisy also had a kitchen sink with orange doors a 'tiled' white back splash and hot water boiler, a stove, again white with orange bottom drawer and set of pans. In the bedroom there is a 'Victorian' range of furniture: a bed made of brass look plastic with two sheets, a pillow and eiderdown in white nylon with pink roses all over, a dressing table with swivel mirror and working (battery) oil lamp, and a wardrobe. These items were originally in brown plastic to represent wood, and then went on to be manufactured in a rich green, the doors of the wardrobe papered in a tiny flower print. The range also included a light pink chaise longue, a cheval dressing mirror and bentwood-style coat and hat stand, a Chesterfield-style arm chair with pedestal side table and an oil lamp.

Daisy also had her own bike with a saddle bag, and a "Daisy mobile", rather like the "Mystery Machine" in Scooby-Doo. Later on she had a scooter which ran on battery power.

== Pets ==
Daisy's pets were a dog called Spot, a Dalmatian, a black Labrador retriever and a horse called Archie, which can be found in three colours: white with black spots, brown and a palomino.

== Booklets ==
Every year a new fashion booklet was issued, showing any new Daisy dolls, and all her latest fashions for that year. Each booklet had a theme; the first, in 1973, being called My Fashion Diary, telling all about Daisy's year and the various outfits she wears each month for various occasions. The 1974 booklet is called My Round the World Holiday, in which Daisy travels the world, showing off more wonderful outfits designed by Mary Quant. Later issues included: My Exciting Life as a Reporter (1975); I'm Having Fun as a Travel Courier (1976); All about my Gift shop (1976); and My Glamorous Life as a Ballerina (1977).

Each fashion book took the reader on a journey in Daisy's busy life. Children could emulate her activities with their own Daisy doll and outfits.

Later fashions (after these booklets) were named "The Optimum" and "Flair" ranges.

== Imitations ==
Daisy was imitated by other manufacturers, using similar head moulds to make clone fashion dolls. These dolls may be unmarked, or be marked simply "Hong Kong".

== Associated items ==
Sets of Daisy paper dolls were produced in the 1970s including:

- Daisy's Fashion Wardrobe 1: Daisy becomes a model
- Daisy's Fashion Wardrobe 3: Daisy at the Fair
- Daisy's Fashion Wardrobe 4: Daisy's Dress Show

A book, Mary Quant's Daisy Chain of Things to Make and Do (ISBN 0001033514) was published by Collins in 1975.
