= Back-chaining =

Language-teaching technique

Back-chaining is a technique used in teaching oral language skills, especially with polysyllabic or difficult words and phrases. The teacher pronounces the last syllable, the student repeats, and then the teacher continues, working backwards from the end of the word to the beginning.

For example, to teach the name ‘Mussorgsky' a teacher will pronounce the last syllable: -sky, and have the student repeat it. Then the teacher will repeat it with -sorg- attached before: -sorg-sky, after which all that remains is the first syllable: Mus-sorg-sky.

Back-chaining makes natural stress easier for the student. It is easier than the front-chaining, which starts from the first syllable, because back-chaining requires that the student put the new element first where it is more difficult to forget.

Back-chaining can also be applied to whole sentences, for instance when teachers model dialogue sentences for learners to imitate. The teacher first models the whole sentence. When they get faulty and hesitant imitation responses from the learners, back-chaining (backward build up) should be used. Here is an example taken from Butzkamm & Caldwell:

Teacher: I‘m studying the present progressive. (Students find it difficult to reproduce the sentence.)
Teacher: Progressive.
Student: Progressive.
Teacher: The present progressive. (Students imitate.)
Teacher: I’m studying the present progressive. (Students imitate the whole sentence correctly.)

== English ==
In English, back-chaining retains phonological structure better than front-chaining. Normally there is no difference in stress between a word spoken in isolation and one spoken at the end of a sentence and it is arguably better to start with the final syllable (main stress in bold):

Chaining sequences for the English word 'aroma':

1. Front-chaining: [ə] - [ə.ˈɹoʊ] - [ə.ˈɹoʊ.mə]
2. Back-chaining: [mə] - [ˈɹoʊ.mə] - [ə.ˈɹoʊ.mə]

Syllables tend to follow a stressed-unstressed pattern in English, example: happy (though there are many exceptions). The order -ma, -roma and aroma respects this. Starting with a- and aro- entails reversing this pattern, which complicates learning. Teachers could choose to present a chain as pairs of syllables too, beginning with -roma, then aroma which introduces the strong-weak stress pattern from the outset.
