= List of Digital Accessible Information System software =

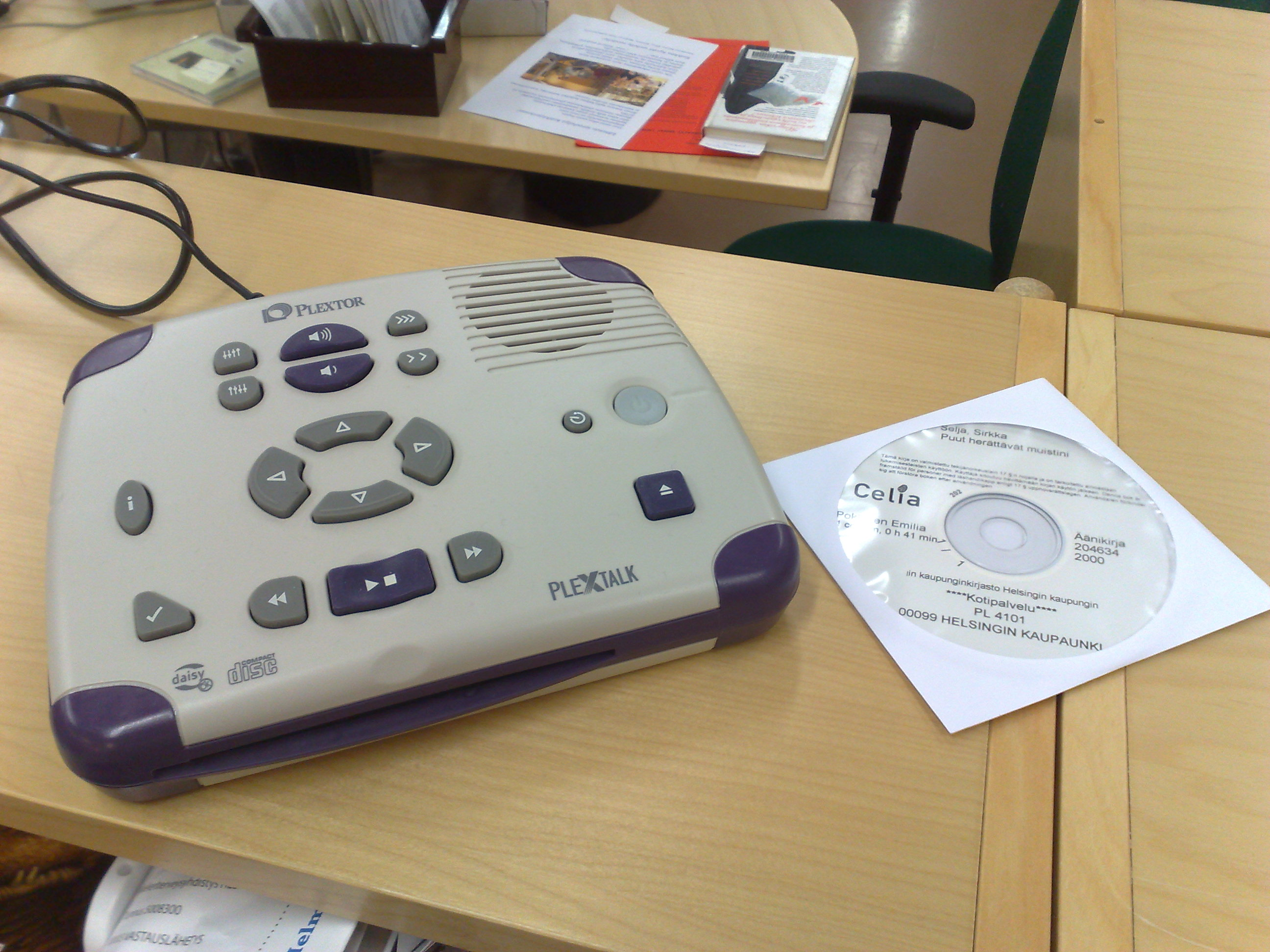
A DAISY player and audio book.

Digital Accessible Information System (DAISY) books can be heard on standalone DAISY players, computers using DAISY playback software, mobile phones, and MP3 players (with limited navigation). DAISY books can be distributed on a CD/DVD, memory card or through the Internet.

A computerized text DAISY book can be read using refreshable Braille display or screen-reading software, printed as Braille book on paper, converted to a talking book using synthesised voice or a human narration, and also printed on paper as large print book. In addition, it can be read as large print text on computer screen.

== Software players ==
Currently available software-based players include, in alphabetical order:

Software players	Description	Author	Operating system / Platform						
Software players	Description	Author	Windows	Mac	Linux	iOS	Android	J2ME	Other
CUCAT Olearia	an open-source DAISY reader for Mac OS X (2008)		No	No	No	No	No	No	No
DAISY Book Reader	open-source player for the GNOME desktop (GTK)		No	No	No	No	No	No	No
Daisy Delight	open-source player for DAISY 2.02, for Mac OS X and Unix-based systems (2008-2013)		No	No	No	No	No	No	No
daisy-player	an open source, multilingual, ncurses-based program for Linux to play DAISY books from the command line	Jos Lemmens	No	No	No	No	No	No	No
DaisyDuck	a free player for Daisy 2.02 audio books	Unknown	No	No	No	No	No	No	No
Dolphin EasyReader and EasyReader Express	commercial e-book reader with support for DAISY, unprotected ePub and other formats, for Microsoft Windows, Android and iOS		Windows 10, Windows 11	Yes	No	Yes	Yes	No	No
Dorina DAISY Reader (DDReader+)	an open source, free software for Windows, reads only DAISY 3.0, available in English, Spanish and Portuguese		No	No	No	No	No	No	No
emerson-reader	an open-source and cross-platform (Linux, Mac OS X, Windows) Epub and DAISY player (2010). Requires Java		No	No	No	No	No	No	No
FSReader	DAISY Player Software for PAC Mate and Desktop; supports DAISY 2 and DAISY 3		No	No	No	No	No	No	No
Pratsam Reader Web	a commercial online DAISY 2.02-player app for web browsers, supporting Chrome, Firefox, Safari, Microsoft Internet Explorer and Edge		No	No	No	No	No	No	No
Pratsam Reader Win	, a Microsoft Windows desktop DAISY 2.02-player a graphical user interface, integrated guiding voice, DAISY Online Delivery Protocol support and keyboard shortcuts for navigation		No	No	No	No	No	No	No
Simple Daisy Web Player	an open-source software program that enables users to play DAISY books in a web browser		No	No	No	No	No	No	No
Texthelp Read&Write	(commercial; for Mac OS and Microsoft Windows)		No	No	No	No	No	No	No
Thorium Reader	Open source. A cross platform desktop reading app, based on the Readium Desktop toolkit. Site, Source code		Windows 10, Windows 11	Yes	Yes	No	No	No	No

=== Discontinued software players ===
- AMIS - Adaptive Multimedia Information System: a discontinued open-source self-voicing player for Windows XP, Vista and 7 that works with several screen readers and is available in many languages. It was developed by the DAISY Consortium.
- Android Daisy ePub Reader: a discontinued open-source project for the Android platform, last updated in 2013
- AnyDaisy discontinued extension for Firefox 3.x by Benetech (does not work in Firefox 4 or above)
- ButtercupReader: a discontinued web-based silverlight application for DAISY 3 books
- DAISYPlayer: discontinued free player for Microsoft Windows; only available in Spanish
- DaisyWorm: player for DAISY 2.02 (2002) and DAISY 3 (2005), for iPhone, iPod touch and iPad; iOS 4 or higher, released commercially in 2010, since discontinued
- Darwin Reader: a discontinued reader for Android, reads DAISY 2.02 and 3.0 text and audio books
- Go Read: an open source DAISY reader for older Android devices (will not install on Android 10)
- GoDaisy: discontinued online DAISY player, in Swedish
- InDaisy Reader, a discontinued player for iPhone and iPod, accessible with VoiceOver; supports Daisy 2.02 and Daisy 3
- Kolibre Vadelma, a discontinued open source DAISY 2.02-player supporting DAISY Online. Downloads and build instructions available for the Raspberry Pi-platform, compile instructions available for Debian Linux.
- MAX DaisyPlayer, a discontinued free player for Microsoft Windows.
- Mobile DAISY Player, a discontinued commercial player for Symbian phones
- Read2Go: a discontinued accessible, commercial e-book reader for Apple iOS devices (iPad, iPhone, iPod Touch), specifically for books from Bookshare, an online library for people with print disabilities; developed by Benetech
- Read:OutLoud 6 (discontinued commercial program for Mac OS and Microsoft Windows)
- Read:OutLoud Bookshare Edition {discontinued}
- ReadHear (commercial, discontinued; for Mac OS and Microsoft Windows)

== Server tools ==
- Daisy Uppsala Archive Project, server-side system for managing DAISY files
- Online Daisy Delivery Technology, open-source software to deliver DAISY books online

== Hardware players ==
There are a wide range of hardware products available that can play DAISY content, usually in a portable form factor. Some of these devices are dedicated to playback of books, while others focus on other functionality, such as PDA or mobile Internet access, and offer DAISY playback as either a feature of the unit or as a software add-on.

A short (incomplete) list of products that have built-in support for DAISY playback includes:

- American Printing House for the Blind, Inc., Book Port Plus and Book Port DT
- Pratsam Mobile, a portable handheld DAISY player that supports cellular networks, the DAISY Online Delivery Protocol, customized for use by the blind and visually impaired
- Victor Reader Stream, a hand-held portable DAISY player for the blind, visually handicapped and print impaired, produced by HumanWare
- Victor Reader Wave, also by HumanWare, is a portable CD player that can play DAISY content from CD media
- BookSense, a similar, smaller unit produced by GW Micro; the advanced XT model features built-in flash memory and Bluetooth headset support for playback, as well as an FM radio
- The National Library Service for the Blind and Physically Handicapped (NLS) in the United States has developed a proprietary DAISY player designed for use by its print-disabled patrons. The player will replace the aging cassette-based distribution system.
- SensePlayer by HIMS, is an advanced, accessible multi-media player, including field recorder, handheld tactile keyboard for the smart phone and tablet, and also including customized portable OCR device. The SensePlayer from HIMS based on Android operating system and paired with a classical, tactile keyboard.

== Production systems ==
Add-ins or extensions to create DAISY files from office software are also available:

- Microsoft and Sonata Software created a Save as DAISY add-in for Microsoft Word to convert Office Open XML text documents to DAISY.
- odt2daisy (OpenOffice.org Export As DAISY): an extension for Apache OpenOffice and LibreOffice that exports OpenDocument Text to DAISY XML or to Full DAISY (both XML and audio).

Other tools for DAISY production include:

- List of products by the DAISY Consortium
- Anemone Daisy Maker, an open-source program to make Daisy books from recordings with optional text and timings data
- Book Wizard Producer
- DAISY Demon, an open-source shell around the DAISY Pipeline to help automate the production of DAISY talking books, MP3, ePub, Word and HTML from XML file; developed by the Open University
- DAISY Pipeline
- daisy-validator
- Dolphin Publisher
- Obi: DAISY/Accessible EPUB 3 production tool
- Pipeline GUI
- PipeOnline, a web interface for the DAISY Pipeline
- PLEXTALK Recording Software
- Pratsam Producer, a production system for producing DAISY (with or without audio), import and management of PDF and XML, content quality measuring tools, automatic export of XHTML, DTBook, EPUB or Microsoft Word documents
- Tobi: an authoring tool for DAISY and EPUB 3 talking books
