= Skill chaining =

Skill chaining is a skill discovery method in continuous reinforcement learning. It has been extended to high-dimensional continuous domains by the related Deep skill chaining algorithm.
