= Daisy Lake (Nipissing District) =

- Location of Daisy Lake in Ontario.
- Location: Nipissing, Ontario, Canada
- Coordinates: 45°39′37″N 78°56′38″W
- Type: Lake
- Primary inflows: Petawawa River, Hambone Creek, Casey Creek
- Max. length: 4.2 km (2.6 mi)
- Max. width: 1.5 km (0.93 mi)
- Surface elevation: 442 m (1,450 ft)

Daisy Lake is a lake in the geographic townships of Butt and McCraney in the Unorganized South Part of Nipissing District, Ontario, Canada. The lake is in the Ottawa River drainage basin and is entirely within Algonquin Provincial Park.

The lake is about 4.2 kilometres (2.6 mi) long and 1.5 kilometres (0.9 mi) wide, lies at an elevation of 442 metres (1,450 ft), and is located about 14 kilometres (9 mi) northeast of the community of Kearney. There are three named inflows, the Petawawa River at the north (just downstream of that river's source at Ralph Bice Lake), Hambone Creek at the northwest and Casey Creek at the southwest, and one unnamed creek inflow at the west. The primary outflow is also the Petawawa River, which flows out of the east of the lake to the Ottawa River.

== See also ==
- List of lakes in Ontario
