= Lake Daisy =

- Location within Florida
- Location: Winter Haven, Florida
- Coordinates: 27.9970°N 81.6592°W
- Type: natural freshwater lake
- Basin countries: United States
- Max. length: 3,395 feet (1,035 m)
- Max. width: 2,265 feet (690 m)
- Surface area: 131 acres (53 ha)
- Surface elevation: 131 feet (40 m)

Lake Daisy is a natural freshwater lake on the east side of Winter Haven, Florida. It has a somewhat oval shape and has a 131-acre (530,000 m^{2}) surface area. On all but its northeast shore it is bordered by residential areas. On the northeast is a residential area that has been only about one-tenth completed. On the northwest of Lake Daisy is a short canal that connects it to the tiny Lake Doll.

Lake Daisy has no public swimming areas. The lake contains largemouth bass, bluegill and crappie.
