= Daisy chaining DNA =

Self-limiting gene editing

Daisy chaining DNA is a form of gene editing, or "gene drive", which, unlike CRISPR, is self-limiting. This means that any alteration made in the laboratory to a gene sequence is limited to a local population only, and cannot be passed on to global populations. It occurs when DNA undergoing PCR amplification forms tangles that resemble a 'daisy chain.' In essence it teaches DNA to count, so that the new strain will only reproduce for a fixed number of generations. It may be useful for instance to alter a particular strain of wheat to suit a local area with no danger of the new strain escaping into wild populations. As a new technique, it must be studied under carefully controlled conditions until it is better understood. Research is typically performed in closed systems on organisms such as yeast, fruit flies, mosquitos, and rapidly evolving nematode worms.

== Process ==
Daisy chaining is when DNA undergoing PCR amplification forms tangles that resemble a 'daisy chain.' During PCR, primers or dNTP's will eventually be used up and limit further reactions. The depletion of primers causes daisy chaining; since the denaturing and annealing processes will still continue without primers, the single-stranded DNA molecules will reanneal to themselves. However, this reannealing does not always occur with another complementary strand. It is this imperfect match up that causes 'tangles'. This gene drive is a self-exhausting form of CRISPR, meaning that it is a local gene drive system. The Daisy chain has a fixed number of generations so although guide molecules were used to replace DNA sequences with edited versions the daisy chain will halt evolution after a certain number of generations.

== Drive Sequences ==
This limited generation evolution is achieved by the drive mechanically using elements that affect each other. An example is a three element daisy chain; element C would be used to activate element B, element B would be used to activate element A. Element C would be the original guide molecule put into the DNA sequence by using molecular scissors with the molecule attached. These scissors cut the DNA sequence and inputs the new guide molecule. This action would halt element C from having any further development, therefore the amount of element C will never increase. As time goes on, DNA uses all of element C, and element C is progressively lost. Element C disappears which is what makes the daisy chain temporary and confined to a population. Since element C is the base, when it is in the presence of element B, element B will steadily increase. When B is in the presence of element A, element A will steadily increase. Element A increases at the fastest rate. Although each of these elements affect each other all of them are genetic boosters which drive the evolution within the population. If all elements were not working there would be no evolution in the species.

- This model can be altered based on population size and desired evolution in the population. The more elements released into the organism, the larger the population size the daisy chain would affect.

== Research ==
Because daisy drives are a relatively new topic, it is not approved for use in society. It is emphasized that until the full effects of daisy chain genome editing are understood, research needs to take place in closed systems in research facilities so the change doesn't affect wild organisms.

Research is performed on closed systems on organisms such as yeast, fruit flies, mosquitos, and rapidly evolving nematode worms.

- What has been observed is that these changes in the genome only benefit the parties conducting the editing, which causes natural selection to negate the effects of the daisy chain. This is the original hypothesis of what the daisy chain intended to do.
