= Daisy Lake (Thunder Bay District) =

Lake in Thunder Bay District, Ontario, Canada

- Location of Daisy Lake in Ontario.
- Location: Greenstone, Ontario, Canada
- Coordinates: 49°45′15″N 87°29′09″W
- Type: Lake
- Max. length: 500 m (1,600 ft)
- Max. width: 200 m (660 ft)
- Surface elevation: 325 m (1,066 ft)

Daisy Lake is a small lake in the Lake Superior and Lake Nipigon drainage basins in the amalgamated town of Greenstone, Thunder Bay District in northeastern Ontario, Canada.

The lake is about 500 metres (1,640 ft) long and 200 metres (656 ft) wide, lies at an elevation of 325 metres (1,066 ft), and is located about 8 kilometres (5 mi) north of the community of Jellicoe on Ontario Highway 11. The primary inflow is an unnamed creek at the east, and the primary outflow is an unnamed creek at the west, which flows through Morham Lake to the Namewaminikan River, a tributary of Lake Nipigon.
