= Daisy Lake (Algoma District) =

- Location of Daisy Lake in Ontario.
- Location: Algoma, Ontario, Canada
- Coordinates: 47°43′36″N 84°09′50″W
- Type: Lake
- Primary inflows: Daisy Creek
- Max. length: 3 km (1.9 mi)
- Max. width: 1.7 km (1.1 mi)
- Surface elevation: 445 m (1,460 ft)

Daisy Lake is a lake in the Lake Superior drainage basin in the Unorganized North Part of Algoma District in northeastern Ontario, Canada.

The lake is about 3 kilometres (2 mi) long and 1.7 kilometres (1.1 mi) wide, lies at an elevation of 445 metres (1,460 ft), and is located about 54 kilometres (34 mi) southeast of the community of Wawa. There is one named inflow, Daisy Creek, at the southwest, and one unnamed creek inflow at the north. The primary outflow is also Daisy Creek, which flows via Shasta Creek, the Jackpine River and the Michipicoten River to Lake Superior.

== See also ==
- List of lakes in Ontario
