= Caramat, Ontario =

Unincorporated community in Ontario, Canada

Coordinates: 49.619645°N 86.132748°W

Caramat is an unincorporated community in Ontario, Canada. It is recognized as a designated place by Statistics Canada. It has a flag stop on VIA Rail's The Canadian service.

== Demographics ==
In the 2021 Census of Population conducted by Statistics Canada, Caramat had a population of 45 living in 26 of its 50 total private dwellings, a change of −10% from its 2016 population of 50. With a land area of 35.28 km^{2} (13.62 sq mi), it had a population density of 1.3/km^{2} (3.3/sq mi) in 2021.

== See also ==
- List of communities in Ontario
- List of designated places in Ontario
