= Tom Mooney (Canadian football) =

Profile
- Position: Offensive lineman

Personal information
- Born: July 18, 1934; Portage, Ohio, U.S.
- Died: June 20, 2014 (aged 79); Guelph, Ontario, Canada

Career information
- College: Miami RedHawks
- NFL draft: 1956: 17th round, 201st overall pick

Career history

Playing
- 1956–1959: Kitchener-Waterloo Dutchmen
- 1961: Montreal Alouettes*
- 1963: Montreal Alouettes
- * Offseason or practice squad member only

Coaching
- 1956–1959: Kitchener-Waterloo Dutchmen (Assistant)
- 1956–1960: Ontario Agricultural College
- 1961–1963: Monklands High School
- 1964: Garden City High School
- 1965–1970: McGill
- 1971–1975: Hamilton Tiger-Cats (Defensive assistant)

Head coaching record
- Career: 31–36–1 (.463)

Thomas Lee Mooney (July 18, 1934 – June 20, 2014) was an American-born Canadian football player and coach who was the head football coach at the Ontario Agricultural College/Ontario Veterinary College (now the University of Guelph) from 1956 to 1960 and McGill University from 1965 to 1970.

== Playing ==
Mooney was born on July 18, 1934 in Portage, Ohio. He was a lineman for the Miami-Ohio football team under coaches Ara Parseghian and John Pont. He was selected in the 17th round (201st overall) 1956 NFL draft by the New York Giants. His brother, Norm Mooney, played college football at Cincinnati and Miami.

From 1956 to 1960, Mooney was a player and coach for the Kitchener-Waterloo Dutchmen. In 1961, he moved to Montreal to try out for the Montreal Alouettes. He played in a number of exhibition games that year and appeared in one regular season game during 1963 season.

== Coaching ==
In 1956, Mooney was named head football coach at Ontario Agricultural College. After starting out 1–7 in his first season, the Redmen went 5–2, 6–1 and 7–0. He also coached OAC/OVC's wrestling and men's basketball teams and won two Ontario Intercollegiate Conference championships in football and one in wrestling. After moving to Montreal, he coached at Monklands High School, leading the football team to a junior GMIAA championship and a senior title in 1962. He then worked as a teacher and coach at Garden City High School in Garden City, Michigan.

In 1965, Monney was named head football and men's basketball coach at McGill. He was the school's first full-time head football coach since 1957. His 1969 team won the a Yates Cup and Atlantic Bowl before losing to Manitoba 24-19 in the Canadian College Bowl. He guided the Redmen team to a 12-26-1 record over six seasons. His basketball teams compiled a 91-58 record.

In 1971, McGill elected to disband its athletic program (with the exception of hockey) and Mooney became an assistant with the Hamilton Tiger-Cats. He was a defensive assistant for the Ti-Cats 1972 Grey Cup championship team.

== Later life ==
Mooney remained with Hamilton through the 1975 season. He then taught physical education at Brock High School, Milton District High School, and E. C. Drury High School. He retired to Temagami. He was a dual citizen of the United States and Canada and resided in Guelph, Ontario at the time of his death on June 20, 2014.
