= Robert Bateman High School =

Location
- 5151 New Street; Burlington, Ontario, L7L 1V3; Canada; 43.3718°N 79.7498°W

Information
- School type: High School
- Founded: 1970
- Status: Closed
- Closed: 30 June 2020
- School board: Halton District School Board
- Principal: Mark Duley
- Grades: 9 to 12
- Enrolment: 790 (October, 2016)
- Language: English, French
- Colours: Purple and Gold
- Renamed: 2004 (Robert Bateman High School)
- Website: rbh.hdsb.ca

Robert Bateman High School (also known as Robert Bateman, or Bateman) operated in Burlington, Ontario, Canada from 1970 to 2020. The school was part of the Halton District School Board, and was established as Lord Elgin High School. After a merger with General Brock High School in 2004 it was renamed Robert Bateman High School.

== Basic information ==
Formerly known as Lord Elgin High School, this school merged with General Brock High School in 2004, and was named after Robert Bateman, a noted Canadian artist and naturalist. Bateman had previously held a placement as a geography and art teacher at Lord Elgin in the 1970s.

Robert Bateman High School enrolled about 800 students within the Applied, Academic, and IB level.

Bateman was a host of the IB Programme; Students from neighbouring cities enrol at Robert Bateman High School for the year programme, which entailed 2 years of free, pre-IB classes, and the 2 year IB programme itself. As well as the IB programme, the school's curriculum featured a variety of service-related courses, in both Mechanics and the Culinary Arts.

The school was closed on June 30, 2020.

== Athletics ==
Sports Offered At Robert Bateman High School
Fall Sports	Winter Sports	Spring Sports
Cross Country	Wrestling Team	Jr. / Sr. Boys’ Soccer
Jr. / Sr. Boys' Volleyball	Jr. / Sr. Girls’ Volleyball	Jr. / Sr. Girls’ Soccer
Jr. Girls' Basketball	Midget Girls’ Volleyball	Baseball / Softball
Golf Team	Jr./ Sr. Boys’ Basketball	Lacrosse
Varsity Football	Midget Boys’ Basketball	Girls’ Rugby
Field Hockey	Curling	Slo-Pitch
Terry Fox Run	Girls’ Hockey	Badminton
Archery Team	Sr. Hockey	Tennis
	Swimming (year round)	Track & Field
	Workout / Fitness Group	CO-ED Volleyball
		Triathlon
		Workout / Fitness Group
		Special Olympics Torch Run

== Clubs, teams, and extra-curricular programs ==
Robert Bateman High School offers a wide variety of clubs, teams, and extra-curricular activities open to all students:

== Academic performance ==
Academically, Robert Bateman High School is rated overall 6.8 out of 10 on the Fraser Institute Report Card and ranked 233 out of 676 in all of Ontario Secondary Schools.

Academic Performance of Robert Bateman in the Past Five Years
Academic Performance	2007	2008	2009	2010	2011	2015	Trend
Avg. level Gr 9 Math (Acad)	3.0	2.9	3.0	3.0	3.0	--	--
Avg. level Gr 9 Math (Apld)	2.5	2.4	2.6	2.8	2.3	--	--
OSSLT passed (%)-FTE	78.1	79.9	83.2	81.3	78.9	--	--
OSSLT passed (%)-PE	44.8	50.7	62.7	37.7	62.2	--	--
Tests below standard (%)	24.8	25.8	22.2	24.2	22.3	--	--
Gender gap (level)-Math	F 0.1	M 0.2	E	E	M 0.2	--	--
Gender gap OSSLT	F 7.3	F 8.6	F 2.2	F 13.3	F 12.5	--	--
Gr 9 tests not written (%)	4.4	1.1	1.0	2.9	2.2	--	--
Overall rating out of 10	6.9	6.3	7.2	6.3	6.3	6.8	--

Compared to other surrounding Secondary Schools (Nelson High School, Assumption Catholic Secondary School, and Lester B. Pearson High School), Robert Bateman ranked an average 10% below the other schools' 2011 Fraser Report Cards. However, the school ranked near par in both OSSLT scores and Average Level Grade 9 Academic Math, and lays within average scores (7.4-5.0) when compared to the whole of Ontario Secondary Schools.

== Notable alumni ==
- Mark Appleyard, professional skateboarder

== Notable faculty ==
- Robert Bateman, Canadian naturalist and artist

== See also ==
- List of high schools in Ontario
