= Burlington Central School =

Location
- 1433 Baldwin St; Burlington, Ontario, L7S 1K4; Canada; 43°19′45″N 79°48′21″W

Information
- School type: Public, middle school and high school
- Motto: Hodie Non Cras (Today, Not Tomorrow)
- Established: 1922
- School board: Halton District School Board
- Superintendent: Tina Salmini
- Area trustee: Leah Reynolds
- School number: 897353
- Principal: Patricia Clark
- Grades: 7–12
- Enrolment: 609 (September 2013)
- Language: English, French Immersion
- Campus: Urban
- Colours: Blue and Gold
- Sports: Tackle Football, Flag Football, Basketball, Volleyball, Field Hockey, Golf, Hockey, Cross Country, Track and Field, Soccer, Swimming, Tennis, Ski & Snowboard, Wrestling, Badminton, Baseball, Cricket, Lacrosse, Ultimate
- Team name: Central Trojans
- Website: bch.hdsb.ca

Burlington Central School - formerly Burlington Central High School (abbreviated BCHS) - is a public middle school and high school in Burlington, Ontario, Canada, in the Halton District School Board. Enrolment was 686 students in September 2008. The current school building was constructed in 1922 and has been added to extensively over the years. The last major addition was made in the 1965, which added a new technical wing and gymnasiums. In 2012 the auditorium was upgraded with new seats and equipment. The school raised funds through community donations and fundraisers. Originally called "Burlington High School", it is the oldest operating high school in Burlington. In 2005, grades 7 and 8 were added to the school to address declining enrolment in the area, at the time. The grade 9-12 portion of the school is still referred to as BCHS, while grades 7-8 are referred to as Burlington Central Elementary.

The longest serving principal, J. M. Bates, started at the school in 1929 and served until 1964.

Many B.C.H.S. students fought in the Second World War and are commemorated in the school's War Memorial.

Academically, Burlington Central High School was ranked as the #1 high school in Burlington, according to the 2011 Fraser Institute Report.

The parents and students of Burlington Central High School mounted a substantial campaign in October 2016 when the Preliminary Report of the Director of Education of the Halton District School Board made the recommendation to close Burlington Central High School along with Lester B. Pearson High School. The #CentralStrong campaign rallied the support of families and businesses, local media, and gathered reams of information to substantiate the financial and community costs of closing Burlington's downtown high school In the Director's final report, the recommendation to close BCHS was dropped, and in May 2017 following a "Program Accessibility Review Committee" process, the Board's trustees voted instead to close Lester B. Pearson and Robert Bateman High Schools

Their gymnasium is named the Trojan Dome, basketball and volleyball games as well as regular physical education classes take place there.

== Athletic Hall of Fame ==
This list is not complete. There have been many other championships over the 97-year history of the school.

- Tony Gabriel
- Ian Sunter
- Jake Ireland
- Don McFarlane
- Cathy Phillips
- Sam Beaulieu

== Sports ==
- Tackle football
- Flag football
- Basketball
- Volleyball
- Field hockey
- Golf
- Ice hockey
- Cross country running
- Track and field
- Soccer
- Swimming
- Tennis
- Skiing & Snowboarding
- Wrestling
- Badminton
- Baseball
- Cricket
- Lacrosse
- Ultimate frisbee

== Clubs and activities ==
- Student Council
- Athletic Council
- World Club
- Anime Club
- Inclusiveness Team
- Glee Club
- FIRST Robotics
- Gay–straight alliance
- Eco Team
- Link Crew
- Student Senate

== Notable alumni ==
- Adam J. Harrington, Canadian actor, voice actor and producer.
- Mark Oldershaw, Olympic bronze medallist.
- Sinéad Russell, Canadian Olympic swimmer.

== See also ==
- Education in Ontario
- List of secondary schools in Ontario
