= General Brock High School =

Former high school in Burlington, Ontario, Canada

Coordinates: 43.3433°N 79.7772°W

General Brock High School is a former high school in Burlington, Ontario, Canada operated by the Halton District School Board. The school was merged with Lord Elgin High School to form Robert Bateman High School in 2004. The site of the high school was then used for Gary Allan High School, an adult and continuing education school.

The field area consisting of several sports fields was under consideration for sale in 2010. This was opposed by residents who wished for it to remain greenspace.

The school was the scene of a shooting in February 1990 when a 17 year old student shot his former girlfriend, her new boyfriend, her best friend and grazed a teacher.
