= Nelson High School (Ontario) =

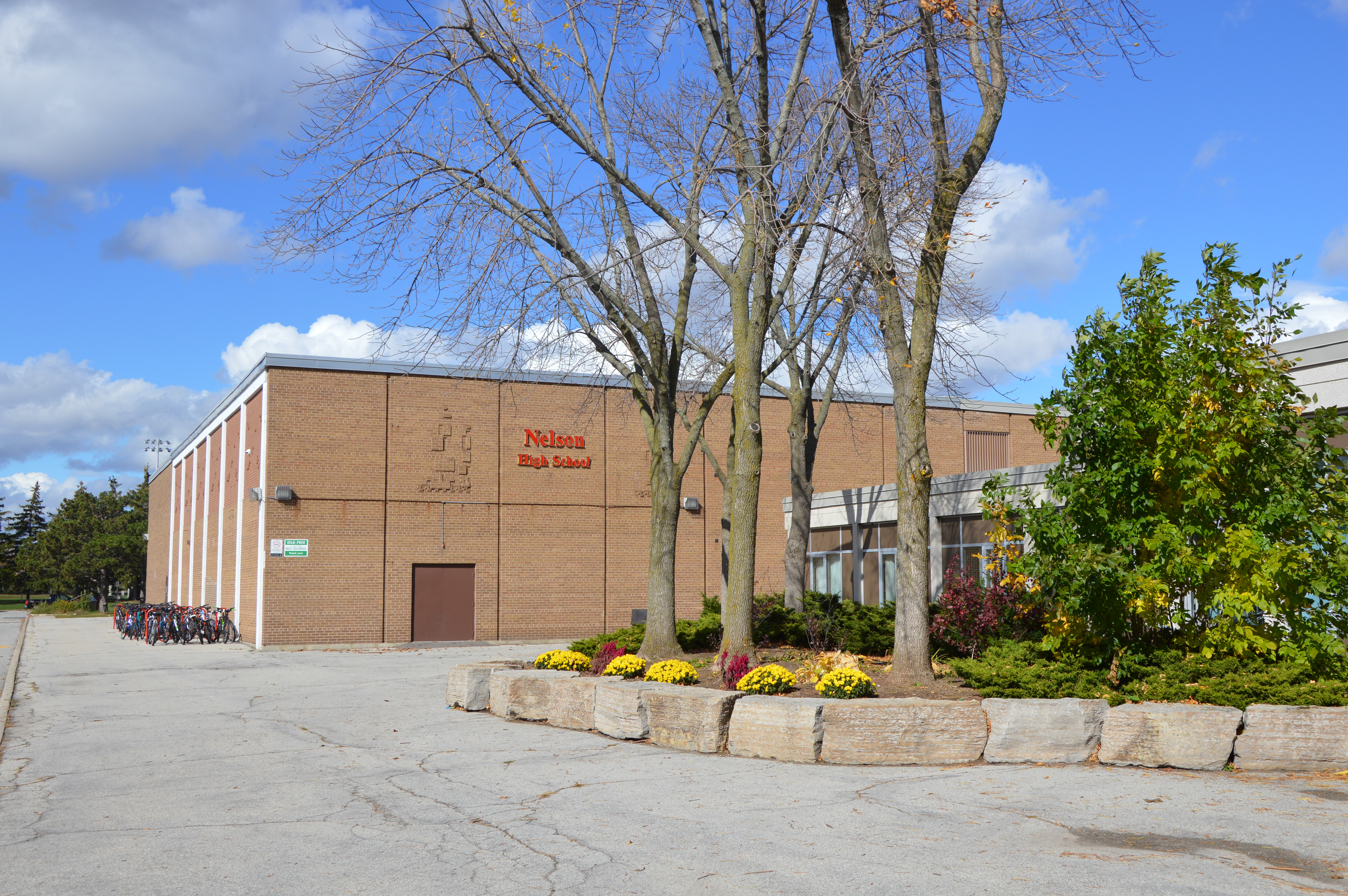
- Front of Nelson High School

Location
- 4181 New St; Burlington, Ontario, L7L 1T3; Canada; 43.35832°N 79.76572°W

Information
- School type: High School
- Motto: "Diligens Providens"
- Founded: 1957
- School board: Halton District School Board
- Principal: Kate Diell
- Grades: 9 to 12
- Enrolment: 1396 (Sept 2022)
- Language: English, French immersion
- Colours: Red, Gold and White
- Mascot: N-Man
- Team name: Lords
- Website: nel.hdsb.ca

Nelson High School of Burlington, Ontario, Canada, is located in Burlington's South Central area and serves approximately 1392 (2022) students between grades 9 and 12 in the Halton District School Board.

== Basic information ==
It was established in 1957 at the intersection of New Street and Belvenia Road. It was named after Horatio Nelson, 1st Viscount Nelson, a British admiral who defeated Napoleon's navy at the Battle of Trafalgar on October 21, 1805. The school celebrated the 200th year since Nelson's victory in 2005 with colourful events and staff dressed as characters from the day. A cubist mural of Nelson's ship, HMS Victory, painted by artist and former teacher Robert Bateman, hangs above a staircase in the school's Canada Foyer. A scale model of the ship can also be found in the library.

The impetus for naming the school may have come from its close proximity to the former village of Port Nelson, which was incorporated into the City of Burlington in 1874. The center of Port Nelson was near Guelph Line and Lakeshore Road, only a few kilometers from the school.

Although the school had been the last non-semestered school in the Halton region, it transitioned to the semestered system in September 2006.

In 2020, the nearby Robert Bateman High School was closed; students and staff were transferred to Nelson. The merger was accompanied by expansion of facilities to accommodate more students as well as additional programs such as the Community Pathways program. The 11 million dollar update includes a state of the art manufacturing and robotics/engineering lab, autobody shop, stem lab, health care specialist high skills major, hospitality lab and cosmetology classroom.

There are seven Specialist High Skills Major (SHSM) programs available at Nelson High School.

Arts & Culture	Creative Performing Arts and Technology (SHSM)
Auto Body, Collision and Refinishing	Auto Body Collision & Refinishing (OYAP)
Engineering, Manufacturing & Robotics	Manufacturing & Welding (SHSM)
Hairstylist	Hairstylist (SHSM) (OYAP)
Health and Wellness	Health Care and Medical Technologies (SHSM)
Transportation (SHSM)	Auto Body, Collision and Refinishing (SHSM)
Transportation (SHSM)	Automotive and Engineering Design (SHSM)

== Campus ==
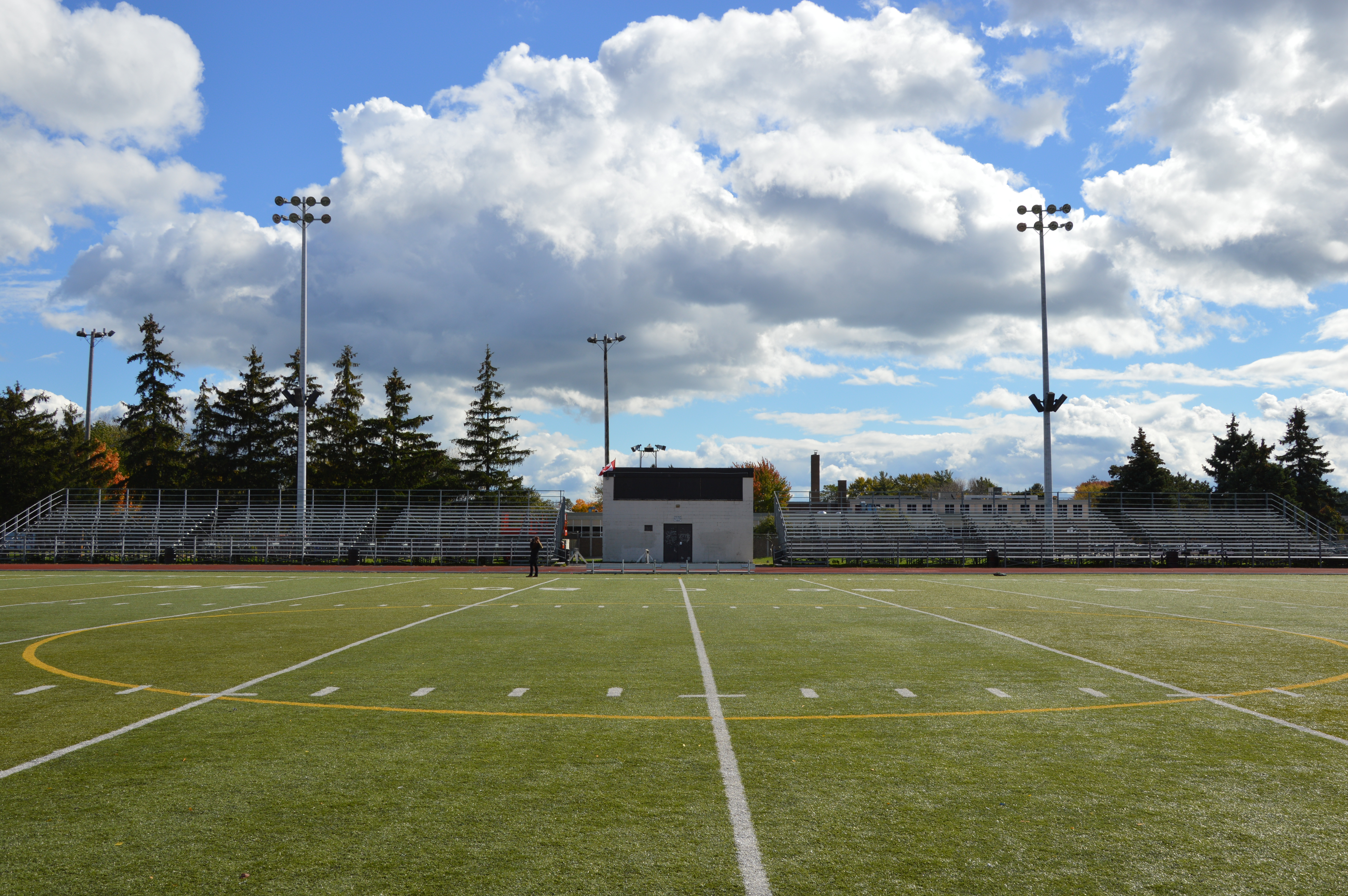
Nelson Stadium

Nelson High School is located in south-central Burlington at the corner of New Street and Belvenia Road. The school is a two-story building with a courtyard at the center. Classrooms, offices, and multiple computer labs (rooms) are typical of the school's 1950s design. In 2019, construction was started on a new cafeteria and library. The new facilities entered use in 2021.

School sports and training facilities consist of two gyms; one large and one small, a weight room and a six lane synthetic athletics track complete with steeple chase equipment. In 2011, a turfed football sports field was completed inside the Nelson Stadium, complementing the Nelson athletics program. In September 2022 the turf field was replaced with the Nelson logo customized on the field.

== Notable alumni ==
- Brady Heslip - G-League/European League basketball Player
- Cory Conacher - NHL forward - Tampa Bay Lightning, Ottawa Senators
- Mychael Danna - Film composer and 2013 Oscar winner for Best Original Score for Life of Pi (film)
- Katie Douglas - Actress
- Bruce Dowbiggin - journalist and sportscaster
- Jordan Hastings - Drummer for Alexisonfire
- Graham Hood - 1500 meter Olympian
- Jesse Lumsden - CFL/NFL running back, Olympic bobsledder
- Emma Maltais - Canadian Hockey Player
- Trevor Meier - Hockey player
- Konrad Ng - Brother-in-law to former U.S. President, Barack Obama
- Adrianne Pieczonka - World renowned opera soprano
- John Priestner - Professional football player LB - NFL Baltimore Colts, CFL Hamilton Tiger-Cats
- Josh Ross - Canadian country music singer
- Patty Sullivan - TV personality

== See also ==
- Education in Ontario
- List of secondary schools in Ontario
