= Aldershot School =

Location
- 50 Fairwood Place West; Burlington, Ontario, L7T 1E5; Canada; 43°18′12.9″N 79°51′09.5″W

Information
- School type: Public, high school
- Motto: Veritas Nos Ducat (Truth Shall Lead Us)
- Established: 1870
- School board: Halton District School Board
- Principal: Scott Williamson
- Grades: 7 to 12
- Enrolment: 1010 (2023-2024)
- Language: English, Core French
- Hours in school day: 6.5
- Colours: Green and gold
- Slogan: Green going for gold
- Mascot: Lion
- Team name: Aldershot Lions
- Website: ald.hdsb.ca

Aldershot School is a grade 7–12 school located in Burlington, Ontario. Although the current school building was constructed in 1959-1960 and opened in 1961, the original Aldershot School was built in 1870, making the name the oldest in continual use for an educational institution in Halton.

Originally a high school (grades 9-13, later cut back to grade 12), grades 7 and 8 were added in 2001 to make use of spare capacity. The school's enrolment is 1010 students as of the beginning of the 2023–2024 school year, with 209 students in elementary and 801 students in secondary.

== Rankings ==
Scores based on EQAO scores and literacy tests place Aldershot far and above other schools in Halton, having been ranked first for performance by the Halton District School Board's (HDSB) annual reviews. It was the top rated school in Halton according to the Toronto Sun (2007), and the 13th best school in the Greater Toronto Area. From 2003 onward, the school's rankings have fluctuated within the top 50 schools in the province, arriving at the 2007 rank of No. 16, and 2008 rank of No. 12 school in Ontario, according to the Fraser Institute.

== Robotics ==
Team 9263, known as the ALD Lions, is a robotics team based at Aldershot School that competes in the FIRST Robotics Competition (FRC) as part of the Ontario District. The team was founded in 2023 and is made up of students who design, build, and program a robot for annual competition.

In its first season, Charged Up (2023), the team received the Rookie All-Star Award and Highest Rookie Seed at the Western University District Event. It later earned the Rookie Inspiration Award at the Ontario Provincial Championship.

During the 2025 season, Reefscape, the ALD Lions won the University of Waterloo District Event, the team's first event victory.

== Miscellaneous ==
In 2019, Aldershot began an I-STEM program, designed to take students through grades 9 to 12.

In 1933, the school underwent a significant redesign influenced by German architects who had been visiting North America, reflecting the growing impact of modernist architectural principles associated with schools such as the Academy of Fine Arts Vienna. This period coincided with continued development in the Burlington and Aldershot area, which had expanded from earlier settlement patterns tied to Lake Ontario trade and nearby historic communities like Port Nelson.

Construction on the redesigned main building continued throughout the 1930s but was halted in 1939 following the outbreak of World War II. As with many infrastructure and institutional projects across Canada at the time, labour and materials were redirected toward the war effort, particularly under federal wartime production controls.

== Notable alumni ==
=== Arts and entertainment ===
- Josh Bradford, guitarist for the band Silverstein
- Kyle Burns, director and writer
- Jim Carrey, actor and comedian
- Jessica Clement, actress
- Gordon Deppe, Sandy Horne, Derrick Ross, and Brett Wickens, members of the New Wave band Spoons, formed by the students while attending the school.
- Chandler Levack, writer and filmmaker

=== Athletics ===
- Melanie Booth, soccer player
- Emma Greco, professional ice hockey player
- Kate Psota, baseball player and coach
- Chris Schultz, football player and sports broadcaster
- Isaiah Smith, Canadian football running back
- John Wallace, Olympic gold medallist in rowing

== See also ==
- Education in Ontario
- List of secondary schools in Ontario
- Halton District School Board
