= Neil Vasdev =

Canadian radiochemist

- PhD, FCAHS, ACSF, FRSC (UK), FSNMMI
- Education: McMaster University (BSc, BA, PhD)
- Known for: PET radiopharmaceutical development, Tauvid co-inventor
- Awards: FCAHS (2026); FSNMMI (2021); ACS Fellow (2020); FRSC (2020)
- Scientific career
- Fields: Radiochemistry, nuclear medicine, molecular imaging
- Workplaces: The Centre for Addiction and Mental Health (CAMH) University of Toronto

Neil Vasdev is a Canadian and American radiochemist and expert in nuclear medicine and molecular imaging, particularly in the application of PET. Radiotracers developed by the Vasdev Lab are in preclinical use worldwide, and many have been translated for first-in-human neuroimaging studies. Vasdev is the Director of the CAMH Neuroscience Institute, the Chief Radiochemist and Director of the Azrieli Centre for Neuro-Radiochemistry at the Centre for Addiction and Mental Health (CAMH). He is the Tier 1 Canada Research Chair in Radiochemistry and Medical Imaging, the endowed Azrieli Chair in Brain and Behaviour and Professor of psychiatry at the University of Toronto.

Vasdev has been featured on Global News, CTV, CNN, New York Times, Toronto Star, New York Post, National Geographic, CBC News, and the Globe and Mail for his innovative research program.

== Life and education ==
Vasdev grew up in Oakville, Ontario, Canada. He attended Oakville Trafalgar High School and graduated from McMaster University in 1998 with double bachelor degrees, summa cum laude, Hon. BSc in chemistry and B.A. in psychology. He concurrently worked as chemist at Astra Pharma and Glaxo-Wellcome. He then earned his Doctorate of Chemistry, supported by NSERC, at McMaster University in 2003, under the supervision of Professors Raman Chirakal and Gary J. Schrobilgen. He continued training with a NSERC postdoctoral fellowship in the Department of Nuclear Medicine and Functional Imaging at the Lawrence Berkeley National Laboratory, mentored by Henry F. VanBrocklin.

== Career ==
Vasdev began his independent faculty career at CAMH/University of Toronto in 2004. From 2011–2017 he served as the Director of Radiochemistry and an Associate Centre Director at the Massachusetts General Hospital and served as an Associate Professor in the Department of Radiology at Harvard Medical School from 2012–2022. He was recruited back to CAMH and the University of Toronto in November 2017.

== Research highlights ==
Iodonium ylide precursors for ^{18}F-labeling

Current methods to radiofluorinate non-activated aromatic rings are generally limited to esoteric electrophilic [^{18}F]F_{2} reactions, transition-metal mediated, or iodonium salt based methods. The Vasdev Lab has a long-established history of labeling non-activated aromatics and recently discovered a simple synthetic strategy for incorporating [^{18}F]fluoride into non-activated aromatic molecules using spirocyclic iodoium ylide based precursors. Based on their paper in Nature Communications, a patent has been licensed by the pharmaceutical industry to employ this method for the synthesis of radiopharmaceuticals in humans. Hence, the iodonium ylide technology for fluorination represents a major advance for PET imaging.

=== ^{11}C-fixation strategies ===
There is a need for new methods of ^{11}C radiosynthesis because current methods are largely limited to methylation. The Vasdev lab has co-developed new techniques of ^{11}CO_{2} fixation that are suitable for human use with diverse precursors synthesized by labeling at the carbonyl group (rather than the common methyl group). This methodology can label ^{11}C-carbamates for imaging the enzyme FAAH ([^{11}C]CURB) or ^{11}C-oxazolidinones for imaging MAO-B (^{11}C-SL25.1188), both of which they have translated for human use. They have also synthesized ^{11}C-ureas and a ^{11}C-carboxylic acid (^{11}C-Bexarotene).

=== New PET radiopharmaceuticals for Alzheimer's disease and brain injuries ===
Vasdev has introduced new radiochemical methods and radiopharmaceuticals for imaging the living human brain. The Vasdev Lab is exploring new ways to image neuroinflammation and tau protein. He is the co-inventor of the method patent for the first FDA-approved tau-PET radiopharmaceutical Tauvid that has been employed worldwide to image patients with Alzheimer's disease (AD) and related dementias, as well as patients with symptomatic traumatic brain injuries, including professional athletes and military veterans. He also led a collaboration with Merck for the first cGMP production of Tauklarify™, and was the first investigator funded by the ADDF and NIH to translate this tau-PET radiopharmaceutical for human use. The Vasdev Lab is partnering with Concussion Legacy Foundation Canada and the Canadian Military to work on the Project Enlist to study whether some military training exercises could be negatively impacting long-term brain health. "We are getting very close to advancing new radio tracers in humans to image the tau that is more prevalent in C.T.E.".
