= Iroquois Ridge High School =

Location
- 1123 Glenashton Drive; Oakville, Ontario, L6H 5M1; Canada; 43.48904°N 79.69926°W

Information
- School type: High school
- Founded: 1994
- School board: Halton District School Board
- Superintendent: Colette Ruddock
- School number: 3-2019 (internal)
- Principal: Jeffery Carey
- Grades: 9-12
- Enrolment: 1571 (2023 - 2024)
- Language: English, French Immersion
- Colours: Blue and Green
- Mascot: Barry the Blazer
- Website: irs.hdsb.ca

Iroquois Ridge High School is a secondary school located in the Iroquois Ridge North neighborhood of Oakville, Ontario. It is often colloquially referred to as "IR", "IRHS", "Iroquois", or "The Ridge."

== Layout ==
Iroquois Ridge High School has three stories, each of which is dedicated to a particular academic field. The first floor is dedicated to courses relating to business studies, the arts, technologies, and physical education. The second floor is devoted to modern languages, social studies, and computer sciences. The second floor is also home to the library and three computer labs. The third floor holds mathematics classrooms and science labs.

== Facilities ==
For recreation, Iroquois Ridge High School has a large gymnasium, a soccer/football field surrounded by a 400-meter track with a long jump pit, and a fitness centre. Across from the school is the Iroquois Ridge Community Centre, which houses a 25-metre swimming pool and the public library. The Town of Oakville maintains two baseball parks behind the school, a hockey and soccer field, a basketball court and a tennis court next to the school. The school itself also houses a library, two art rooms, two music rooms, an auto workshop, a construction workshop, a theater, a cafeteria, and numerous computer and science labs.

== History ==
Iroquois Ridge High School was founded in 1994. Barry Finlay was the founding principal of the school.

=== Accomplishments ===
Time	Event
1998-1999 school year	Teachers were in a legal strike position and students rallied together to organize a sit-in support of the hardworking teachers. This peaceful protest was held in the front hall of the school with encouraging speeches; local media covered the event.
2004-2005 school year	Was in the CTV late night news for collecting over $800 in under 20 minutes for tsunami relief help. The school's Global Issues Council runs the Halloween 4 Hunger Food Drive, which collects over 3,000 non-perishable food items for the Oakville Fairshare Food bank each year. The Council also runs World Vision's 30 Hour Famine and raises more than $10,000 each year.
October 2006	Set a world record for the most people "standing against something" (part of the school's "Stand for Sudan" project). This record was published in the 2007 edition of the Guinness World Records and was the class of 2010's graduating gift.
May 2007	Hosted Stephen Lewis, who honoured the students for raising $21,000 towards the Stephen Lewis foundation.
2009-2010 school year	With a $6.2 million infusion from the Province, became one of the first secondary schools in Ontario with the installation of 25 large solar panels on the roof of the school.
May 2011	Raised $48,000 during its Relay For Life event for cancer.

==== Iroquois Ridge renaming controversy ====
On March 6, 2024, members of the Halton District School Board approved the start of a renaming process after a community member complained that the term Iroquois is a “colonial settler term for the Haudenosaunee and is seen as a derogatory term and is not respectful of Indigenous peoples,” according to the school board’s report Barry Finlay, the founding principal of Iroquois Ridge told National Post in an interview that the school was named after Lake Iroquois, the prehistoric lake that is now Lake Ontario.

== School Rankings (Fraser Institute) ==
Year	Ranking
2009-2010	#16 out of the 727 public secondary schools in Ontario, and #1 in the Halton District.
2016-2017	#25 out of 747 public secondary schools in Ontario.
2019-2020	#10 out of 739 public secondary schools in Ontario.
2022-2023	#10 out of 739 public secondary schools in Ontario.

== Notable alumni ==
- Kyle Bekker, Centre Midfielder for the Canadian Premier League, Forge FC
- Daniel Clark, star of Degrassi: The Next Generation and Juno (film)
- Joshua Close, actor, filmography includes The Pacific (miniseries), The Exorcism of Emily Rose and Twist The Craigslist Killer
- Christian Martyn, actor, filmography includes Home Alone: The Holiday Heist, Citizen Gangster and Workin' Moms.
- Victor Oreskovich, Winger for NHL Vancouver Canucks
- Jasmine Richards, star of Camp Rock and Naturally, Sadie
- Brian Robinson, bassist in Massachusetts-based punk band A Wilhelm Scream, former bassist of The Fullblast
- Jessica Shepley, LPGA member
- Austin Smeenk, Paralympian wheelchair racer, winning a gold and bronze medal in men's T-34 at the 2024 Summer Olympics
- Ethan Stuart, Winnipeg Blue Bombers Defensive Back

== See also ==
- Education in Ontario
- List of secondary schools in Ontario
