= White Oaks Secondary School =

Location
- 1330 Montclair Drive; Oakville, Ontario, L6H 1Z5; Canada; 43°27′48″N 79°42′05″W

Information
- School type: Public, High school
- Founded: 1965
- School board: Halton District School Board
- Superintendent: Colette Ruddock
- Area trustee: Kelly Amos
- School number: 953121
- Principal: Mark Duley
- Grades: 9–12
- Enrolment: 2257 (2025–2026)
- Language: English, French immersion
- Colours: Blue and Gold
- Mascot: Wildcats
- Website: wos.hdsb.ca

White Oaks Secondary School (WOSS) is a secondary school located in Oakville, Ontario, Canada.

The school has north and south campuses, across the road from each other. The north campus used to be attended by students who had different levels and types of capabilities than those of the south campus. The school now acts as a whole, and students can take classes at North or South campus. The north campus offers hands-on technical programs such as hairdressing, child care, autobody and carpentry, as well as classes for students with a wide range of disabilities, and English Language Learner programs (ELL), and is the location for recognized Ontario Youth Apprenticeship Programs (OYAP) and the Ford Academy of Manufacturing Sciences (FAMS). White Oaks also offers French at the immersion level, as well as the International Baccalaureate Diploma programme. In the Fraser Institute's report on Ontario schools for the 2019–2020 year, the school was ranked 21 out of 739 secondary schools with an overall rating of 8.6/10.

== History ==
White Oaks Secondary School was formerly a World War II bomb shelter constructed in the early 1940s as part of local civil defense efforts. The structure was designed for durability rather than long-term civilian use, featuring reinforced concrete, narrow corridors, and limited natural light.

Following the end of the war, the bomb shelter was converted into a secondary school with minimal structural renovation. As a result, much of the building's original infrastructure remained in use, contributing to its distinctive layout and aging facilities. The site's origins as a bomb shelter are frequently cited in discussions of the school's condition and design.

== Notable alumni ==
- Chris Hadfield, the first Canadian to walk in space, spent four years at White Oaks Secondary School before attending Milton District High School for his OAC.
- Mike Vanderjagt, ex-NFL kicker.
- Shane Told, the lead singer of the Post-Hardcore band Silverstein.
- Glenn Milchem, drummer for popular Canadian band Blue Rodeo.
- Tony Mandarich, NFL Green Bay Packers #1 Draft Pick graduated from White Oaks Secondary School
- Geri Hall, actress on Canadian comedy show "This Hour has 22 Minutes", popular TV commercial actor.
- Arda Ocal, Host of "Right After Wrestling" on The Score Television Network.
- Diana Matheson, midfielder for Canada's women's soccer team.
- Mark McEwan Chef, Entrepreneur, host of Top Chef Canada
- Kinley McNicoll, former soccer player
- Rob Zamuner, former NHL hockey player
- Dan Lett, actor
- Scott Wilson (ice hockey), former NHL hockey
- Madeline Schizas, Canadian Olympic figure skater
- Shawn Stasiak, chiropractor, motivational speaker and retired professional wrestler

== See also ==
- Education in Ontario
- List of secondary schools in Ontario
