= Dr. Frank J. Hayden Secondary School =

Location
- 3040 Tim Dobbie Drive; Burlington, Ontario, L7M 0N6; Canada; 43°23′53″N 79°49′09″W

Information
- School type: Public, High school
- Founded: 2013
- School board: Halton District School Board
- School number: 893675
- Principal: Tanya MacLean
- Grades: 9 to 12
- Enrolment: 2,009 (September 2017)
- Language: English, French
- Colours: Scarlet, Grey, Black
- Mascot: Frankie
- Team name: Huskies
- Website: dfh.hdsb.ca

Dr. Frank J. Hayden Secondary School, is located in the northern area of Burlington, Ontario, Canada, at 3040 Tim Dobbie Drive. It is an English school in the Halton District School Board that as of 2023, serves approximately 1400 grade 9-12 students. In its first year, Dr. Frank J. Hayden Secondary School served approximately 600 students in grades 9–10. The school is named for Special Olympics pioneer Dr Frank J. Hayden.

== Co-curricular programs ==
Dr. Frank J. Hayden has a wide variety of co-curricular programs, not called extracurriculars as that supports the notion that participating in clubs and teams is extra work, which is an idea that Hayden would like to discourage. Some of the clubs and teams that the school offers are:

=== Athletics ===
Sports Offered At Dr. Frank J. Hayden Secondary School
| Fall Sports | Winter Sports | Spring Sports |
|---|---|---|
| Volleyball Team | Basketball Team | Baseball Team |
| Field Hockey | Hockey Team | Badminton Team |
| Cheerleading Team | Swimming Team | Soccer Team |
| Golf Team | Curling Team | Cross Country |
| Football | Snowboarding/Skiing Team | Track & Field |
| | | Rugby |
| | | Lacrosse Team |

=== Arts ===
- Choir
- Jazz Band
- Wind Ensemble
- Sears Drama Festival
- Hayden Theatre
- Production Crew

=== Clubs ===
- Student Council
- Environment Club (Eco)
- Social Justice Club
- Mental Health and Wellbeing Team
- Athletics Council

== Events at Hayden ==
The school's Social Justice Council organizes a Pink Day in October where students were encouraged to wear pink and donate to charities focused on and promoting awareness of breast cancer. Hayden also hosts an annual Winter Semi Formal, organized by the Student Council. Student Council also orchestrates Inside Ride, a fundraiser to raise money for children with cancer by gathering sponsors and riding stationary bikes. Staff at Hayden coordinate an annual lip dub, where the student body lines the walls of Hayden and mouth the lyrics to a song to create a promotional video for future students. The school recently celebrated its 10th Year Anniversary, where both former and current student and staff enjoyed the festivities.

== Notable alumni ==
- Myles Erlick (2016), actor and singer
- Razvan Preotu (2017), chess grandmaster
- Amanda West (2019), soccer player for the Houston Dash
- Victoria Mboko, Tennis Player

== See also ==
- Education in Ontario
- List of secondary schools in Ontario
