= Milton District High School =

High school in Milton, Ontario, Canada

Coordinates: 43.5060°N 79.8709°W

Milton District High School (MDHS) is a public secondary school located in Milton, Ontario, Canada. MDHS is part of the Halton District School Board and had a preliminary enrollment of 1,535 students in the 2024-2025 school year.

Prior to Milton District High School's second opening in 1967, students had attended the original Milton District High School on Martin Street. When the new high school opened, students in grades 10 to 12 were transferred there, and Martin Street School became a high school serving only grade 9 students. MDHS remained the only secondary school in Milton until E.C. Drury High School (now serving deaf students only) opened in 1980, followed by Bishop Reding Catholic Secondary School in 1986.

== Canadian Improv Games National Gold Champions in 2012 ==
In 2010, the MDHS Improv Team were national finalists in the Canadian Improv Games held at the National Arts Centre in Ottawa. They placed 4th, among approximately 400 teams from across the country. In 2011, it placed first, winning gold in the Toronto Regionals of the Canadian Improv Games, moving on to the National Arts Centre in Ottawa for the national competition. In 2012, it again placed first and won gold in the Toronto Regionals. At the National competition of the Canadian Improv Games at the National Arts Centre in Ottawa, Milton placed first in the semi-finals then continued to win gold in finals night. They are currently the national champions in CIG.

== Hurricane Ivan ==
Hurricane Ivan struck Grenada in September 2004 and staff and students from the School spent their March break visiting Grenada to help with the rebuilding process. Radio Canada interviewed them from the scene.

== Censorship controversy ==
A Milton student's parent opposed the use of a novel, Foxfire: Confessions of a Girl Gang, written by Joyce Carol Oates, in the grade 12 advanced English course, due to its themes of sexuality and violence, and the profane language used. This raised significant questions about the extent to which books used in high schools should be censored and Ontario's former education minister John Snobelen said that he sympathised with the group Parents Against Corrupt Teachers who lobbied the Halton board of education to remove Foxfire from the school.

== Transport petition ==
On October 2, 2000 Halton Hills Council agreed to forward to Transport Canada a petition from students of Milton District High School, E.C. Drury School, and Georgetown District High School that requested the installation of a set of barriers at the CN Rail railway crossing at Fourth Line.

== Athletics ==
A student was the silver medallist at the Eastern Canada Cup and a semifinalist at the Canadian Summer Nationals, both in the 100-yard backstroke. The school has a football and soccer field.

== Robotics ==
Milton District is home to FIRST Robotics Competition team 3571. An annual international high school robotics competition, high school students, mentors and coaches team up to build game-playing robots over a six week period.

== Notable alumni ==
- Kayla Alexander, WNBA centre
- Kyle Alexander (born 1996), basketball player for Hapoel Tel Aviv of the Israeli Basketball Premier League; forward-center
- Zakaria Amara, attempted terrorist
- David James Elliott (born 1960), star of the television series JAG.
- Chris Hadfield (born 1959), first Canadian to walk in space.
- Nick Hector, award-winning filmmaker and academic
- Bruce Hood, NHL referee
- Peter McDuffe , NHL & WHA goaltender
- Mark Saunders, Chief of the Toronto Police Service
- John Tonelli, NHL centre forward and four-time Stanley Cup Champion

== See also ==
- Education in Ontario
- List of secondary schools in Ontario
