= Victor Oreskovich =

Canadian ice hockey player (born 1986)

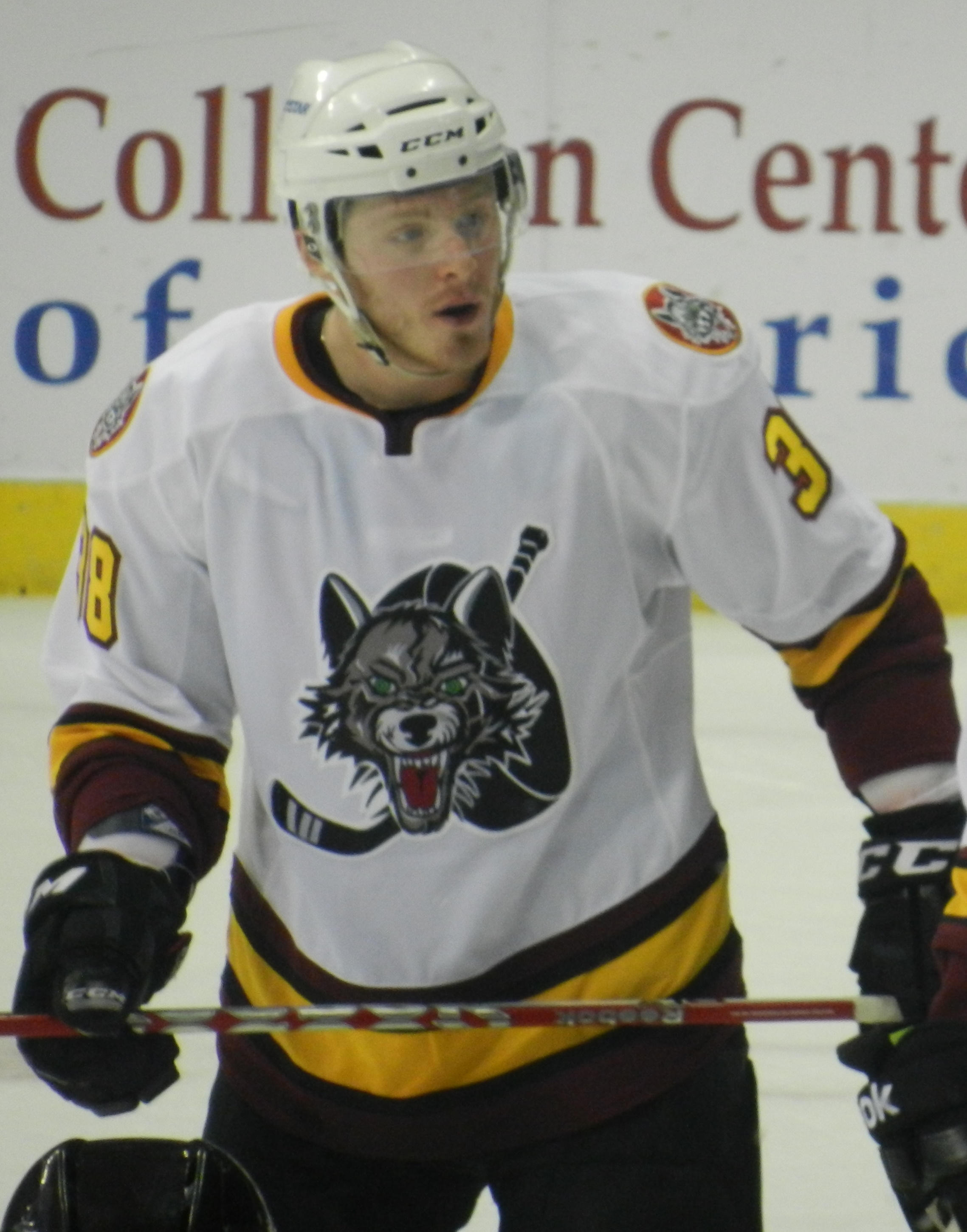
- Oreskovich with the Chicago Wolves in 2011
- Born: August 15, 1986 (age 40) Oakville, Ontario, Canada
- Height: 6 ft 3 in (191 cm)
- Weight: 225 lb (102 kg; 16 st 1 lb)
- Position: Right wing
- Shot: Right
- Played for: Florida Panthers; Vancouver Canucks
- NHL draft: 55th overall, 2004; Colorado Avalanche
- Playing career: 2009–2012

Victor J. Oreskovich (born August 15, 1986) is a Canadian former professional ice hockey player. A winger, he was selected 55th overall in the 2004 NHL entry draft by the Colorado Avalanche.

He played for the Notre Dame Fighting Irish of the Central Collegiate Hockey Association (CCHA) and Kitchener Rangers of the major junior Ontario Hockey League (OHL) before deciding to turn professional. After signing a contract with the Avalanche in 2007, he was assigned to the team's American Hockey League (AHL) affiliate, but chose not to report and spent two years away from hockey. In 2009, he signed with the Florida Panthers and spent the subsequent season between the NHL and the team's AHL affiliate, the Rochester Americans. The following off-season, he was traded to the Canucks, joining the team in 2011 on their run to the Stanley Cup Final, where they lost to the Boston Bruins. In October 2011, he was waived by the Canucks and assigned to the Chicago Wolves, the Canucks' AHL affiliate. Oreskovich retired from hockey in 2012, and returned to university in 2015. He completed a Master of Business Administration degree, and joined the Royal Bank of Canada.

== Personal life ==
Oreskovich was born in Whitby, Ontario, the son of Victor and Diane, and grew up in Oakville, Ontario. He is of Italian-Croatian descent. He attended high school at Notre Dame College School in Welland, Ontario, as well as at Iroquois Ridge High School in Oakville. While playing college hockey with the Notre Dame Fighting Irish, he studied finance before dropping out to join the Kitchener Rangers. He later re-enrolled at University of Notre Dame during his two-year hiatus from his hockey career, to complete his finance degree.

After his playing career ended Oreskovich spent two years working at Sun Life Financial, moving into a management position. In 2015, Oreskovich enrolled at the Richard Ivey School of Business at the University of Western Ontario to complete his master's degree in Business Administration, which he received in 2016. He subsequently took up a position with the Royal Bank of Canada.

== Playing career ==
=== Amateur career ===
Oreskovich played minor hockey with the Oakville Rangers of the Ontario Minor Hockey Association South-Central Triple A Hockey League, winning two provincial rep championships with the club in the mid-1990s. He played in the 1999 and 2000 Quebec International Pee-Wee Hockey Tournaments with the Markham Islanders, and then the Toronto Marlboros. After one year with the St. Catharines Falcons in the Greater Ontario Junior Hockey League, Oreskovich's playing rights were acquired by the Windsor Spitfires of the Ontario Hockey League (OHL), who selected him in the sixth round of the 2002 OHL Priority Selection. Interested in maintaining his eligibility for college hockey in the United States, Oreskovich instead played the 2002–03 season with the Milton Icehawks of the Ontario Provincial Junior Hockey League (OPJHL), before joining the Green Bay Gamblers of the United States Hockey League (USHL) the following year. He recorded 37 points in 58 games and was named to the 2004 USHL All-Star Game. Following his season with the Gamblers, Oreskovich was selected in the second round, 55th overall, of the 2004 NHL entry draft by the Colorado Avalanche.

Recruited to play college hockey with the Notre Dame Fighting Irish of the Central Collegiate Hockey Association (CCHA), Oreskovich joined the club following his draft on a US$42,000 annual scholarship. He struggled in his freshman year, recording three points in 37 games. With aspirations to turn professional sooner, he left Notre Dame nine games into his sophomore year to join the OHL, where his major junior rights had been traded on November 24, 2005, from Windsor to the Kitchener Rangers. Kitchener was Oreskovich's desired destination to play major junior, as his best friend and former minor hockey teammate Evan McGrath starred with the Rangers. In December 2005, he debuted with the Rangers, scoring goals in his first three games. He went on to record 16 points over 19 games for the remainder of the 2005–06 season. Oreskovich attended the Avalanche's training camp at the start of the 2006–07 season, where he was among the first cuts reassigned back to junior. Returning to the Rangers for a second season, he finished with 28 goals and 60 points in 62 games.

=== Professional career ===
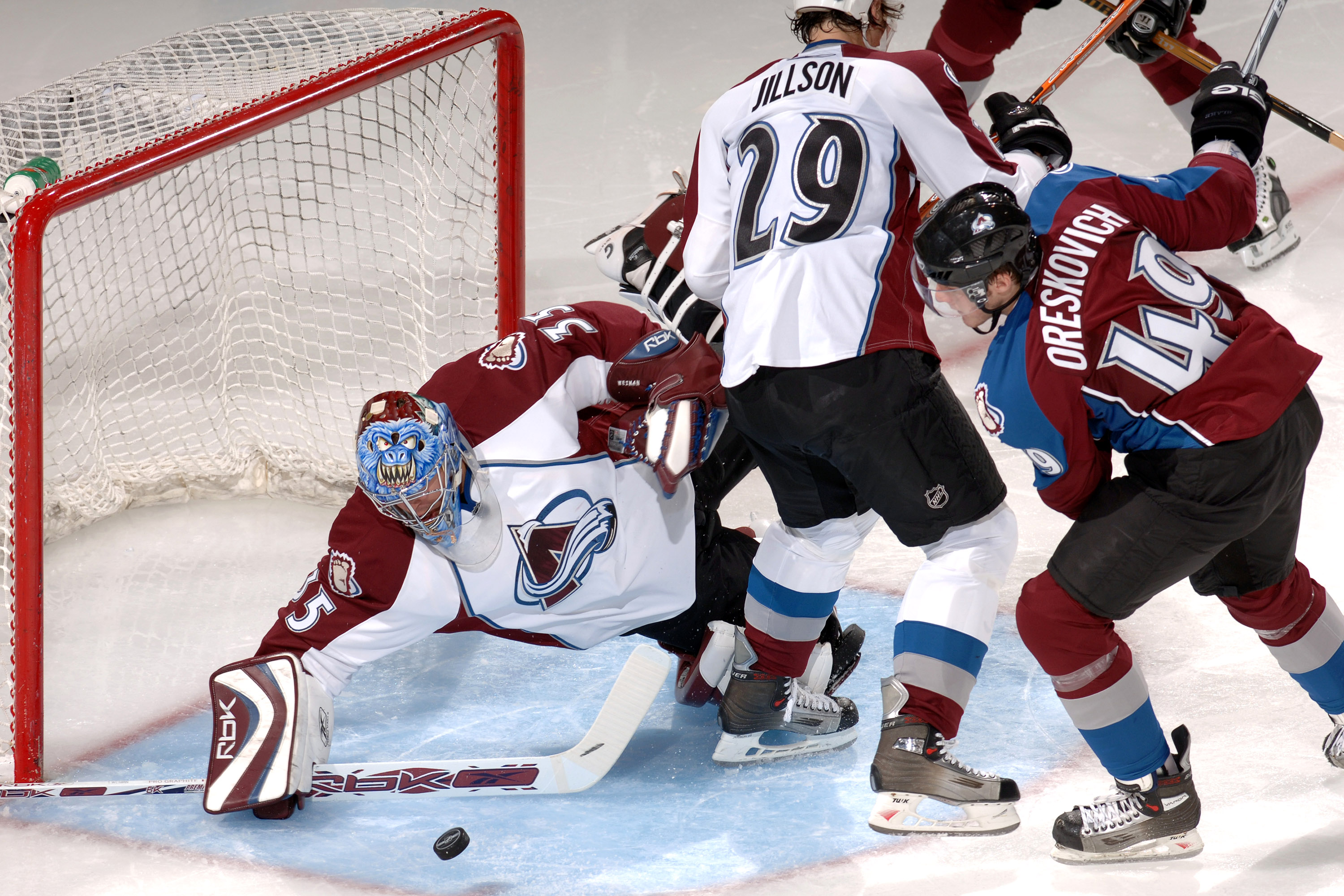
Oreskovich (right) during an intra-squad scrimmage with the Colorado Avalanche in 2007

The following off-season, on July 7, 2007, Oreskovich was signed to a two-year, entry-level contract by the Colorado Avalanche. He returned for his second Avalanche training camp for the 2007–08 season and was assigned to their American Hockey League (AHL) affiliate, the Lake Erie Monsters. Oreskovich, however, did not report to the Monsters; he was suspended by the Avalanche, before announcing his retirement from the game, citing burnout and a lost drive, and re-enrolled at Notre Dame.

After a two-year hiatus, Oreskovich regained ambitions to play professionally and reached out to former Kitchener Rangers coach Peter DeBoer, now head coach of the NHL's Florida Panthers. He earned a try-out with the Panthers at their training camp for the 2009–10 season. He was assigned to Florida's AHL affiliate, the Rochester Americans and was signed to a two-year contract with the Panthers on October 7, 2009. Within less than a month, Oreskovich was called up to the NHL, making his debut with the Panthers against the St. Louis Blues on October 31. Providing an energetic checking presence with the Panthers, he scored his first NHL goal against Jonathan Quick of the Los Angeles Kings in a 4–3 defeat on November 16. He split his professional rookie season between the Panthers and Americans, scoring six points over 50 games in the NHL and 15 points over 34 games in the AHL.

During the 2010 NHL entry draft on June 25, 2010, Oreskovich was traded to the Vancouver Canucks along with defenceman Keith Ballard in exchange for Michael Grabner, Steve Bernier, and Vancouver's first round pick, the 25th overall selection, used to select Quinton Howden. Following the pre-season, the Canucks assigned Oreskovich to their AHL affiliate the Manitoba Moose. Shortly after returning from a shoulder injury that sidelined him for 15 games, he was recalled by the Canucks on February 10, 2011. After making his Canucks debut two nights later against the Calgary Flames, he spent the remainder of the regular season being assigned back-and-forth from the Canucks and Moose, recording 3 assists over 16 NHL games and 12 points (4 goals and 8 assists) over 40 AHL games. Oreskovich remained with the Canucks for the entire 2011 playoffs. He played in 19 games, not recording any points, as the Canucks lost in the Stanley Cup Final to the Boston Bruins.

During the off-season, Oreskovich became a restricted free agent on July 1, 2011. Without arbitration rights (due to his lack of experience in the league), negotiations with Vancouver continued through the summer. As training camp neared, Oreskovich agreed on a one-year, two-way contract worth $605,000 in the NHL and $105,000 in the minors. Prior to the start of the season he was waived by Vancouver after the team traded for Dale Weise from the New York Rangers. After clearing waivers, he was assigned to the Canucks' new AHL affiliate, the Chicago Wolves on October 5, 2011. Returning to the AHL, he suffered a concussion that sidelined him for several games. Following his recovery, he was called up to the Canucks on December 5, 2011, to replace injured winger Chris Higgins. He appeared in one game during the call-up before being sent back down, with Canucks head coach Alain Vigneault suggesting he did not play physical enough. Oreskovich retired at the end of the season, citing injury concerns.

== Career statistics ==
			Regular season					Playoffs
Season	Team	League	GP	G	A	Pts	PIM	GP	G	A	Pts	PIM
2001–02	St. Catharines Falcons	GHL	47	13	27	40	38	4	0	1	1	0
2002–03	Milton Icehawks	OPJHL	49	28	46	74	51	—	—	—	—	—
2003–04	Green Bay Gamblers	USHL	58	11	26	37	33	—	—	—	—	—
2004–05	Notre Dame University	CCHA	37	1	2	3	69	—	—	—	—	—
2005–06	Notre Dame University	CCHA	9	2	1	3	8	—	—	—	—	—
2005–06	Kitchener Rangers	OHL	19	6	10	16	16	5	0	2	2	4
2006–07	Kitchener Rangers	OHL	62	28	32	60	48	5	2	0	2	4
2009–10	Rochester Americans	AHL	34	6	9	15	18	6	0	0	0	10
2009–10	Florida Panthers	NHL	50	2	4	6	26	—	—	—	—	—
2010–11	Manitoba Moose	AHL	40	4	8	12	38	—	—	—	—	—
2010–11	Vancouver Canucks	NHL	16	0	3	3	8	19	0	0	0	12
2011–12	Chicago Wolves	AHL	28	6	6	12	26	—	—	—	—	—
2011–12	Vancouver Canucks	NHL	1	0	0	0	7	—	—	—	—	—
AHL totals			102	16	23	39	82	6	0	0	0	10
NHL totals			67	2	7	9	41	19	0	0	0	12
