= Craig Kielburger Secondary School =

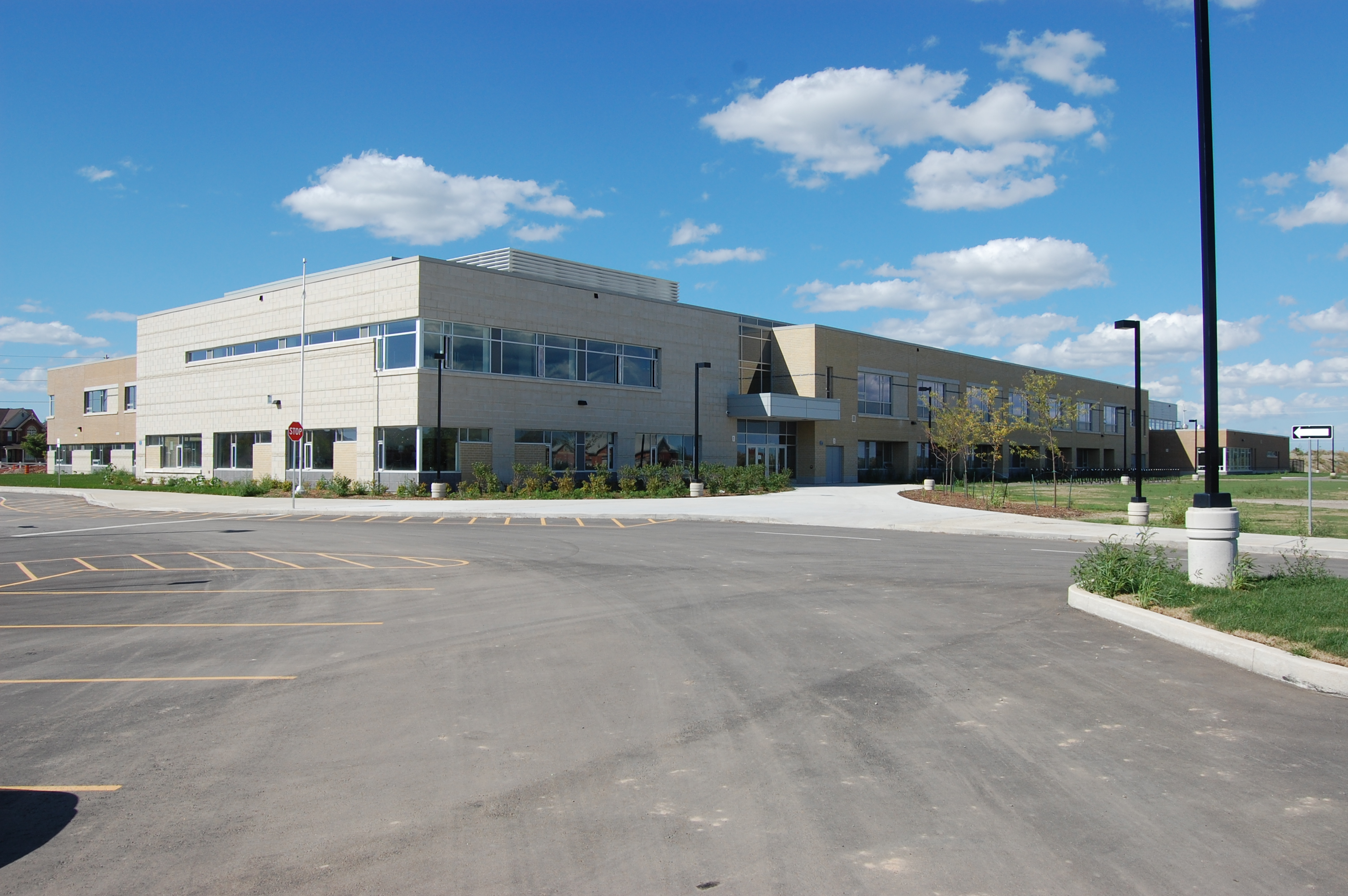

Location
- 1151 Ferguson Dr; Milton, Ontario, L9T 7V8; Canada; 43°30′53″N 79°49′37″W

Information
- School type: Public, high school
- Founded: September 2012
- School board: Halton District School Board
- Superintendent: Jennifer Fowler
- Area trustee: Naveed Ahmed
- School number: 967740
- Principal: Joanne Eliuk
- Grades: 9-12
- Enrolment: 2030 (June 2024)
- Language: English
- Colours: Green and Gold
- Team name: Spartans
- Website: cks.hdsb.ca

Craig Kielburger Secondary School /ˈkiːlbɜːrɡɜːr/, is a high school located in Milton, Ontario, Canada. The two-storey school features barrier-free accessibility, a triple gymnasium, theatre and studio space, culinary arts kitchen, technical education facilities, and the International Baccalaureate (IB) Diploma Programme. This school replaced E.C. Drury High School which closed in June 2012. The school is named after Craig Kielburger, founder of Free the Children. Kielburger attended the school's grand opening on October 9, 2012.

== Academics ==
Craig Kielburger Secondary School offers courses in all four educational pathways: university, college, apprenticeship and workplace. In addition, the school offers the IB Diploma Program.

== Special programs ==
- IB Diploma program
- French Immersion is a program designed to help students become fluent in French.
- The Community Pathways Program provides education and training for developmentally challenged students.
- ESL/ELD High School Program provides English as a second language training for High School students.
- Specialist High Skills Majors (SHSM)
  - Transportation
  - Green Industries
  - Hospitality
  - Information and Communications Technology
  - Arts and Culture
  - Social Justice
  - Business

== Sports teams ==
The CKSS Spartan Wrestling Team has developed a tradition of winning team and individual medals at regional (GHAC) and provincial (OFSAA) tournaments since 1987.

At the 2015 OFSAA Championship, the CKSS Spartan Wrestling Team proved that they are the most dominant team in Ontario by winning the boys' team title.

The CKSS Spartan Football Team was formed in 2013

The CKSS Junior Field Hockey Team made it to the playoffs for the first time in 2013.

In 2014, the CKSS Junior Field Hockey Team won the Tier 2 Halton Junior Field Hockey Championship.

In 2017, the CKSS Senior Field Hockey Team finished 4th at the OFSAA Provincial Field Hockey Championship.

In 2023, the CKSS Senior Field Hockey Team competed in the OFSAA Provincial Field Hockey Championship.

== Non-Sports teams ==
FIRST Robotics Competition Team 4992, Sparbotics. 2014 Waterloo Regional Finalists. 2018 Ontario Regional Semis. 2023 McMaster University District Winner, OPC-Technology District Championship Division Winner, Ontario District Championship Winner

== Arts ==
The arts department at Craig Kielburger Secondary School has extra curricular activities including Neon, Xenon, Choir, Concert Band, Jazz Band, Fall Show (Formerly Junior Show), Senior Show and One-Acts.

In May 2023, Neon, Xenon, and Choir performed at MusicFest Canada The Nationals, earning silver medals for both Xenon and Choir and a gold medal for Neon. All three teams also performed at Ontario Vocal Festival earlier that year.

== Notable alumni ==
- Nik Henning, Professional Football Player (Las Vegas Raiders)
- Megan Carter, Professional Hockey Player (Las Vegas)

== See also ==
- Education in Ontario
- List of secondary schools in Ontario
