= Acton District School =

Location
- 21 Cedar Rd; Acton, Ontario, L7J 2V2; Canada; 43.6432°N 80.0333°W

Information
- Type: Public
- Motto: Lux Sit (Latin: Let there be light)
- Established: 1927
- School board: Halton District School Board
- School number: 890332
- Principal: Kelli Pfeiffer
- Grades: 7-12
- Gender: Coeducational
- Enrolment: 305
- Campus: Suburban
- Colour
- Team name: Bearcats
- Provincial Ranking (2024-25): 220 / 747
- Provincial Ranking (5 years): 292 / 655
- OSSLT 2024 pass rate (first-time eligible): 87 %
- Website: act.hdsb.ca

Acton District School - formerly Acton District High School (abbreviated ADHS) - is a combined middle school and high school located in Acton, Ontario, Canada. The school is under the jurisdiction of the Halton District School Board. The grade 9-12 portion of the school is still referred to as ADHS, while grades 7-8 are referred to as Acton Elementary.

== History ==
The Acton High School (originally known as the Acton Continuation School) had been governed by the Acton School Board, since its establishment of a High School Department in 1903. It would receive its own building (later known as the "old stone school") in 1927.

Administration of the Acton and Milton high schools was taken over by the North Halton High School District Board in 1948, which managed high school affairs for the towns of Acton and Milton, and the townships of Esquesing and Nassagaweya, with an aim to replace the schools with a newly constructed building at Speyside. This plan was effectively scuttled when Georgetown decided to accede to the Board in 1950 on the understanding that the project would not proceed, and the Speyside plan was cancelled in July 1949.

Acton chose to force the issue of establishing a new high school. As the present one was in premises leased from its public school board, which badly needed extra space, notice was given to the district board in 1950 that Acton's secondary students would be diverted to Guelph Collegiate Vocational Institute if a new high school was not ready for occupation by the time the present lease expired. In 1952, Ontario's Department of Education would recommend such a new school, together with additions in Milton and Georgetown. This would lead to its construction, officially opening in November 1954. However, the school year had already begun there in September, with the school already requiring an extra room and teacher to deal with an unanticipated rise in enrolment.

The building would see further expansions over the years:

- three additional rooms in 1955, to cope with under-capacity on its initial opening
- two extra rooms, a home economics room, a laboratory and a gymnasium-auditorium in 1959
- a swimming pool was added in 1975

Following the North Halton board's three-way split in 1959, the Acton High School District Board took over at the beginning of 1960, and would administer the school until the formation of the Halton Board of Education in 1969.

The high school would move to its present location in 1977, with the building being officially opened in November that year.

In September 2021, because of declining high school enrolment (mainly triggered by the increasing preference of Acton's Catholic families to send their children over to Georgetown's Christ the King Catholic Secondary School), Acton students in grades 7 and 8 would have their classes transferred over to that building. This move was quickly ratified by the Board.

The school's motto is Lux Sit, which roughly translates as "Let there be light." Why this particular phrase was chosen in place of the more classical rendition of Fiat Lux is not clear.

== Ranking ==
The 2025 Fraser Institute Report Card on Secondary Schools gives ADHS the following ranking:

Fraser Institute ranking
Report	Current	Five years
2024	220 / 747	292 / 655

Fraser Institute Academic Performance
Report	Rating
2024	7.0/10
2023	6.3/10
2022	6.0/10
2019	6.3/10
2018	6.4/10
2017	6.4/10
2016	6.3/10
2015	5.8/10
2014	6.1/10
2013	7.3/10

== Sports ==
During the 1960s, ADHS athletes accrued a notable record in track and field events, winning three individual OFSSA championships, accepting four related athletic scholarships to US colleges, winning a CWOSSA cross-country title, and competing in British Empire Games or Olympic trials three times. Until 1971, Acton competed in the Central Western Ontario Secondary Schools Association (CWOSSA), at which point it opted to take a hiatus to concentrate on intramural sport. That was after a recent streak of winning titles in hockey, basketball and athletics. From 1973, the school moved to the Halton Secondary School Athletic Association, which is now part of the Golden Horseshoe Athletic Conference.

The school teams are collectively known as the Bearcats. Their former name was the Redmen.

== See also ==
- Education in Ontario
- List of secondary schools in Ontario
