= Gary Allan High School =

Public secondary school in Ontario, Canada

Coordinates: 43.3433°N 79.7772°W

- Halton Region, Ontario; Canada

Information
- School type: High school
- School board: Halton District School Board
- Website: garyallan.ca

Gary Allan High School (GAHS) is a public secondary school located in Halton Region, Ontario, Canada. GAHS, part of the Halton District School Board.

GAHS is oriented towards adult, alternative and Community Education programs.

Gary Allan High School is named after Gary Allan, a Canadian educator.

The school uses the site that was previously General Brock High School.
