= Oakville Trafalgar High School =

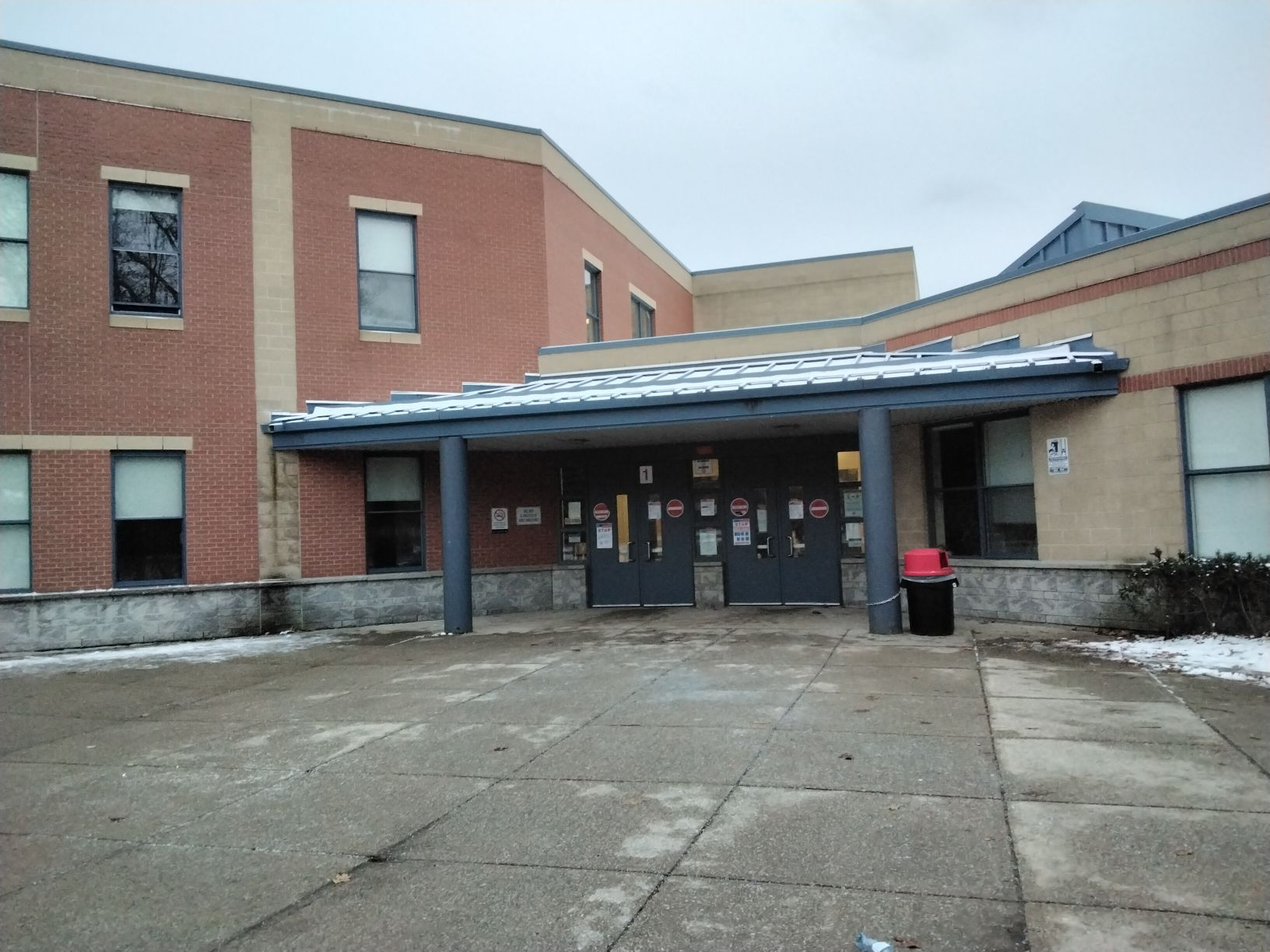
- Main entrance

Location
- 1460 Devon Road; Oakville, Ontario, L6J 3L6; Canada; 43°28′21″N 79°39′16″W

Information
- Motto: Palma non sine pulvere (Latin) (No reward without effort)
- Established: 1908
- Status: Open
- School board: Halton District School Board
- Principal: Darlene White
- Grades: 9–12
- Enrolment: 1275 (2023–2024)
- Hours in school day: 6.35 Hours
- Colours: Black and Red
- Athletics: Football, Volleyball, Basketball, Curling, Baseball, Rugby, Soccer, Swimming, Cross Country, Hockey, Field Hockey, Golf, Tennis, Track, Ski, Snowboarding, Field Lacrosse
- Nickname: OT
- Team name: Red Devils
- Publication: Devil's Advocate
- Website: oth.hdsb.ca

Oakville Trafalgar High School (OTHS, often referred to as OT) is a secondary school located in Oakville, Ontario, Canada. The school receives most of its students from nearby feeder schools, including Maple Grove Public School, École E.J. James Public School, St Luke's Catholic Elementary School, St. Vincent's Catholic Elementary School and James W. Hill Public School, as well as many students coming from private schools.

The school is also host to a YMCA child care centre for children aged 18 months to five years.

== History ==
Oakville Trafalgar High School was the second high school established in Oakville. Before, there was Oakville Grammar School on Navy Street where a branch of the Oakville Public Library now stands. That school was redesigned by architect Alfred Chapman and became the original Oakville Trafalgar High School in 1908 on Reynolds Street. In 1946, the districts of Trafalgar and Oakville merged and the school's name was changed to Oakville Trafalgar High School.

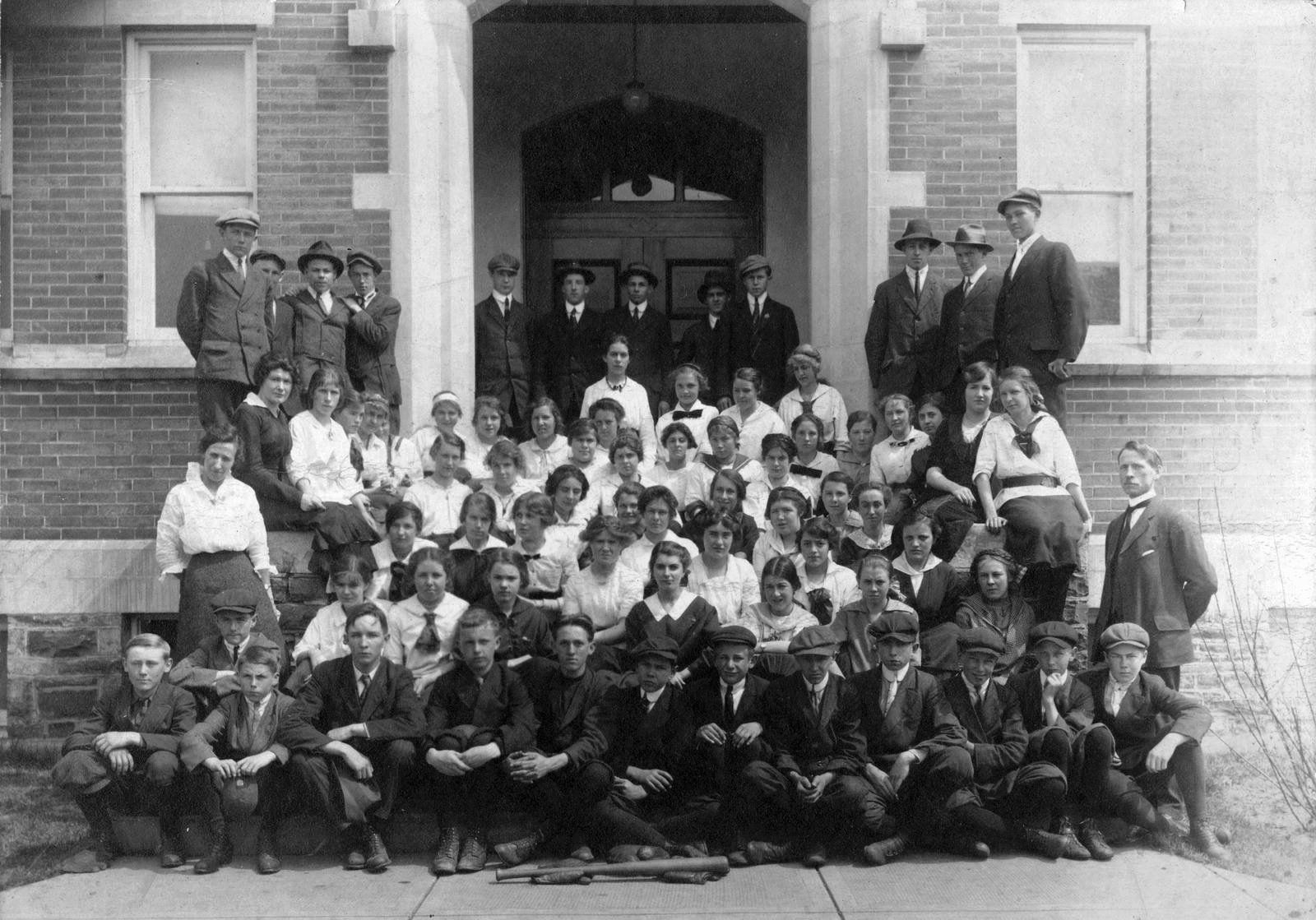
Students of the school in 1915

During World War I and World War II, the school field was converted into a field where students grew crops to send overseas. During this time different sports and clubs formed, with the two most popular being rugby and hockey. Both attracted a large fan turnout. The largest and most popular change was the allowance of dances; dances were banned in the school. 34 students, listed on the school's cenotaph, fought and died during World War II.

By 1988, 80 years after it opened, the Halton District School Board determined the OTHS building on Reynolds Street no longer met the school's needs. The superintendent said the existing building was crumbling, overcrowded, antiquated, and had no room to expand; the chair of the board called it "overcrowded and rundown." Renovation was considered at first, but ultimately the board opted to relocate the school to a "high-tech" $18 million new facility on Devon Road. This decision was controversial in the community because of the cost and the perceived demerits of the site. The debate spread beyond public complaints and into the legal realm: a police investigation was opened to review the board's actions, but no misconduct was found and no charges were laid.

Despite the friction over the years-long process to upgrade the school, the new OTHS location on Devon Road opened in September 1992. At the opening ceremony, former Oakville mayor (and former OTHS student) Bill Perras called it "one of the most controversial schools ever built." The new building, designed by local architect Andrew Bruce, features a stylized brick facade in the main atrium that mimics the roofline of the original school on Reynolds Street.

=== Prosthetic breasts controversy ===
In September 2022, the school was the subject of an international controversy after a transgender teacher was filmed teaching a class wearing large prosthetic breasts with protruding nipples. The Halton District School Board defended the teacher and said the teacher's employment was rightfully protected by the Ontario Human Rights Code, though it stated that it was also reviewing its dress code policy. People's Party of Canada (PPC) leader Maxime Bernier called for the teacher to be fired. Some parents and PPC supporters protested the teacher's clothing.

In November 2022, the board's dress code review recommended not adopting a stricter dress code for all employees because it could open the board up to liability for human rights violations.

In January 2023, Halton District School Board reversed its position, and announced a dress code for teachers beginning in March 2023. As of early March 2023, the teacher was still employed at the school board. The teacher who was the subject of the controversy has since left Oakville Trafalgar.

== Relay for Life ==
In 2019, Oakville Trafalgar High School was Canada's number one youth fundraiser for the Canadian Cancer Society's Relay for Life event, raising over $1 million for charity in the years the fundraiser has taken place.

== Notable alumni ==
- Zenon Andrusyshyn, CFL, NFL and USFL punter and kicker
- Larry Cain, Olympic gold medallist sprint canoer
- Jamie Campbell, sportscaster
- Dillon Casey, actor
- Steve Christie, NFL and CFL placekicker
- Sam Gagner, NHL hockey centre
- Meredith Anne Gardner, freestyle skier
- Cody Goulebef, NHL hockey defenseman and Olympic bronze medallist
- Hagood Hardy, Composer and musician, Member of the Order of Canada
- Doug Henning, magician
- James Hinchcliffe, race car driver
- Kara Hultgreen, one of the first female combat pilots in the United States Navy
- Maria Jelinek, Canadian, North American, and World Champion pair skater with brother Otto Jelinek
- Otto Jelinek, Canadian, North American, and World Champion pair skater with sister Maria Jelinek. Federal politician, Canadian Ambassador to the Czech Republic
- Sandra Post, professional golfer
- John Ralston Saul, author and former viceregal consort of Canada (spouse of Adrienne Clarkson)
- Michael Misa, NHL hockey centre

== See also ==
- Education in Ontario
- List of secondary schools in Ontario
