= Link Crew =

Link Crew is a North American student leadership program created by the Boomerang Project. Its focus is on making select individuals from the Junior and Senior classes, known as "Link Leaders," into mentors for freshmen and new students.

The training process consists of team building, cooperative skill development, discussion skills, situation scenarios, and other activities. After two to four days of training, leaders are assigned six or seven freshmen to mentor. The program aims to expose incoming freshmen to a variety of positive experiences.

The program teaches students that by working together they can be successful to create a positive experience for freshmen. It claims to increase academic success through the peer support. It welcomes freshmen and makes them feel comfortable throughout their first year.

Link Leaders start the school year by helping at freshman orientation. This allows the Link Leaders to get the freshman class excited and develop relationships that will contribute to their success. After orientation Link Crew continues, providing academic and social follow-up activities throughout the year. Through this program, students learn that people at school care about them and their success.
