= Charged Up (FIRST) =

2023 FIRST Robotics Competition game

- Year: 2023

Season Information
- Number of teams: 3,324
- Number of regionals: 61
- Number of district events: 105
- Championship location: Houston; George R. Brown Convention Center

FIRST Championship Awards
- Impact Award winner: 321 - "RoboLancers" (Note: Formerly the Chairman's Award)
- Woodie Flowers Award winner: Mark Buckner - Team 4265
- Founder's Award winner: Donald Bossi - former President of FIRST
- Champions: 1323 - "MadTown Robotics"; 4414 - "HighTide"; 4096 - "Ctrl-Z"; 2609 - "BeaverworX"

Charged Up, stylized as CHARGED UP and officially known as Charged Up presented by Haas for sponsorship reasons, was the FIRST Robotics Competition game for the 2023 season. The game is part of the FIRST-wide FIRST Energize theme for the 2022-2023 season, which focuses on energy and sustainable development. The season's kickoff event occurred on January 7, 2023, and was streamed live on Twitch.

As in the 2022 season, the 2023 season featured only one championship event as opposed to the two events that took place from 2017 to 2019 (and that were planned for 2020). In an effort to increase the number of teams that can attend the championship, there were no Week 7 events during the season to allow late-qualifying teams more time to prepare for the event and travel to Houston. Additionally, on October 20, 2022, FIRST announced that the championship will be expanded to at least 600 teams in 8 divisions, making it the largest event in FRC history.

== Field and Scoring ==
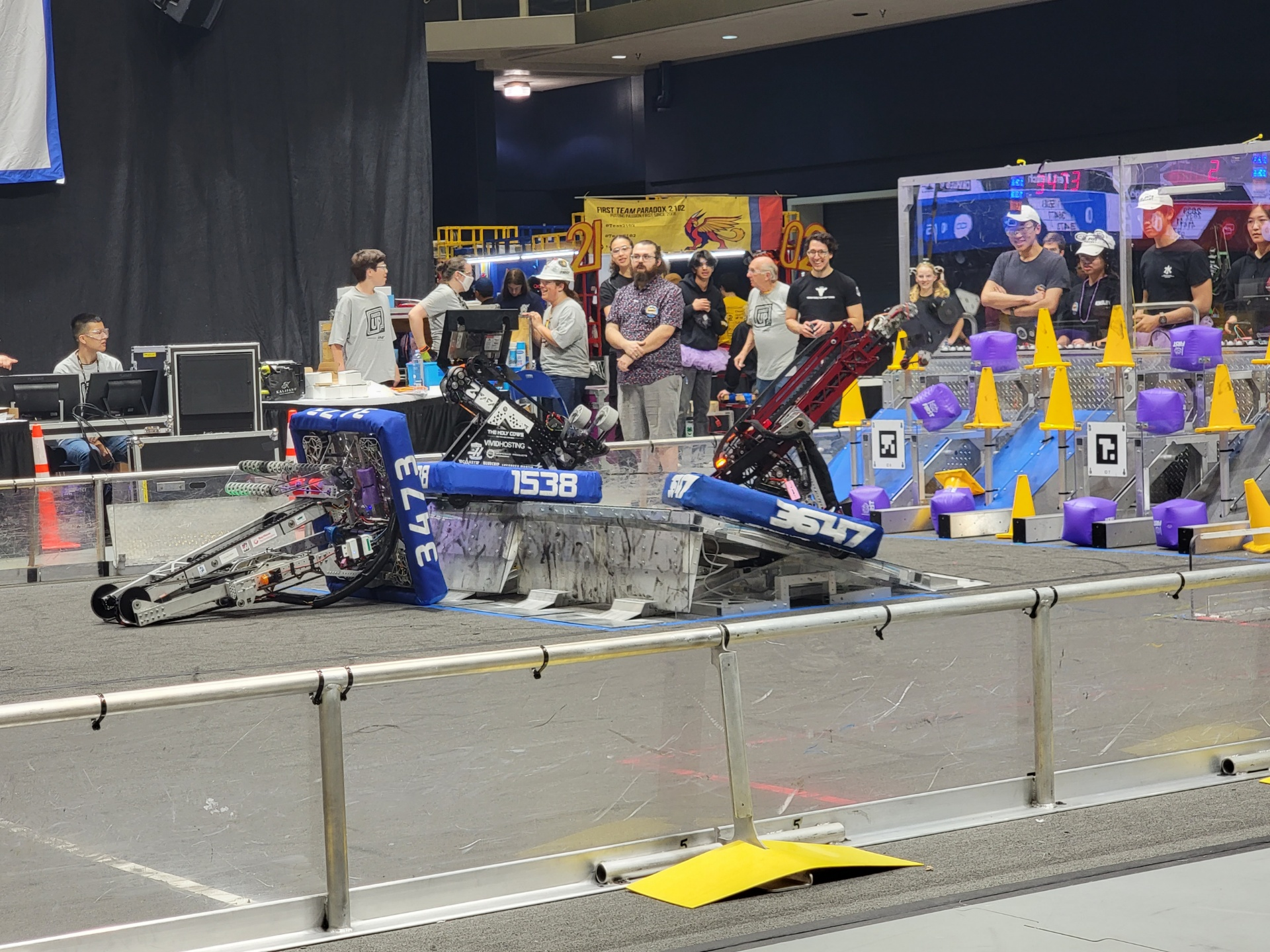
The Blue Alliance side of the field following a match.

Charged Up is played on a 27 feet (8.2 m) by 54 feet (16 m) field covered in grey carpet. The field is surrounded by low polycarbonate walls on the long sides and taller alliance station walls on the short sides. The Single Substations (part of the human player stations) on the long sides also feature a taller wall made of wire mesh panels.

The field is divided in half by a white line, and each half includes one alliance's Community and the other alliance's Loading Zone. The primary scoring areas are the two Communities (one per alliance), which are located near the two alliance station walls. Robots begin the match fully contained within their alliance's Community. Each Community includes a Grid where game pieces can be scored and a Charging Station that robots can drive onto and balance on during the autonomous period and towards the end of the match.

=== Game Pieces ===
There are two game pieces in Charged Up: Cones and Cubes. Cones are yellow rubber cones, approximately 1 foot (30 cm) tall with an approximately 8 inches (20 cm) square base. Cubes are cube-like objects made of purple fabric that are inflated to approximately 9.5 inches (24 cm) when measured from face to face. Cubes have rounded corners and may not have flat surfaces.

=== Player Areas ===
==== Alliance Stations ====
There are two alliance stations on the short sides of the field, one for each alliance. Each station is divided into three smaller stations where the teams that make up the alliance control their robots. The opposing alliance's Loading Zone is located on the far side of each alliance's station when viewed from the scoring table.

==== Loading Zones ====
The Loading Zones, or human player stations, are used to introduce game pieces onto the field and form a right angle around the two far corners of the field. Each Zone consists of a Single Substation and a Double Substation, with the former located on a long side of the field and the latter located on a short side next to the opposing alliance's station. Each substation includes a portal that human players can place game pieces into. The Single Substation's portal is a ramp that drops the game piece onto the field, while the Double Substation's portal can either be used to drop a piece onto the field or place the piece on a sliding shelf for one of the alliance's robots to pick up.

=== Scoring Areas ===
==== Grids ====
The six Grids (three for each alliance) are located in front of their respective alliance station wall. Each set of grids consists of two outer grids and a coopertition (co-op) grid, each of which are divided into three rows (top, middle, and bottom). Within each grid, game pieces can be placed on nine Nodes, with two Nodes reserved for Cubes and four Nodes reserved for Cones. The remaining three Nodes, known as hybrid nodes, can accept either game piece. Alliances earn points for placing game pieces on the Nodes, with more points awarded for pieces scored on Nodes in the top and middle rows of each grid.

Alliances can also earn points by placing game pieces on three adjacent Nodes in the same row, which is known as a Link. Prior to the FIRST Championship, an alliance could earn the Sustainability Bonus ranking point (RP) by creating five links. This threshold could be lowered to four for both alliances if both of the co-op grids had at least three game pieces placed in them. After Week 6, the bonus threshold was increased to six links and can be lowered to five through the co-op grids.

The post-Week 6 modifications also added rules to allow alliances to earn Supercharge points after filling their set of Grids. Once this is accomplished, 3 Supercharge points are earned if an additional game piece is scored on a Node regardless of the Node's row.

==== Charging Stations ====
The two Charging Stations (one for each alliance) are 8 feet (2.4 m) by 6.5 feet (2.0 m) rectangular structures located approximately 8 feet (2.4 m) from the edge of their respective alliance's Grids and centered on the width of their alliance's Community. Similar to the bridges in Rebound Rumble, the Charging Stations can be driven onto and balanced by robots in order to earn points in both the autonomous and teleoperated periods. While the stations are large enough to fit all three of an alliance's robots, only one robot can score points on their alliance's station during the autonomous period.

In both periods, points can be earned if a robot Docks or Engages with their alliance's station. A robot is Docked if they are only contacting their Charging Station and/or other objects (ex. other robots) that are directly or transitively supported by the station. A Docked robot is also Engaged if their Charging Station is level and all other robots from their alliance that are contacting the station are Docked. Additionally, alliances can earn the Activation Bonus RP by scoring at least 26 Charging Station points during the match.

==== Scoring Summary ====
Action	Autonomous	Teleoperated	Ranking Points (in Qualification)
Robot exits Community	3 points		
Game piece on bottom row	3 points	2 points	
Game piece on middle row	4 points	3 points	
Game piece on top row	6 points	5 points	
Supercharge bonus		3 points	
Link		5 points	
Docked	8 points (Max one robot)	6 points	
Docked and Engaged	12 points (Max one robot)	10 points	
Park		2 points	
Sustainability Bonus			1 RP
Coopertition Bonus			Sustainability Bonus threshold reduced to 5 for both alliances
Activation Bonus			1 RP
Win			2 RP
Tie			1 RP
Foul	5 points to opposing alliance	5 points to opposing alliance	
Tech Foul	12 points to opposing alliance	12 points to opposing alliance	

== Events ==
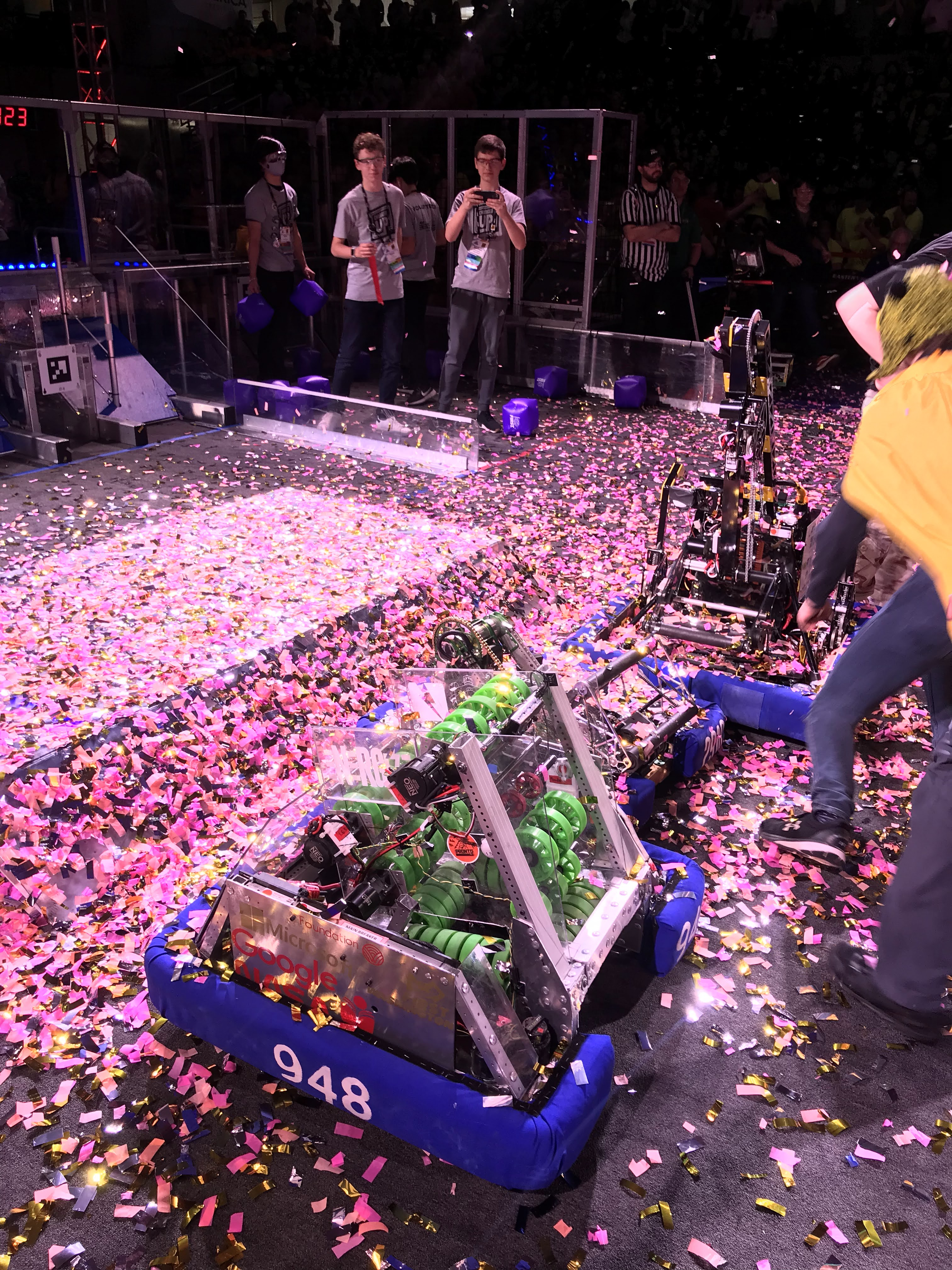
The Blue Alliance's robots after winning the PNW District Championship

The 2023 regular season is divided into six weeks, with many events occurring simultaneously during each week. After the end of the regular season, teams that have qualified compete in the FIRST Championship in Houston.

=== Week 1 ===
Event	Location	Date	Champions
FIRST Israel (ISR) District Event #1	Ra'anana, Central District, Israel	February 26 – 28	1576 Voltrix, 1577 Steampunk, 1690 Orbit
Canadian Pacific Regional	Victoria, British Columbia, Canada	February 28 – March 3	4613 Barker Redbacks, 359 Hawaiian Kids, 244 RoboDawgs 3D
ISR District Event #2	Ra'anana, Central District, Israel	March 1 – 3	7112 EverGreen, 7039 XO, 3339 BumbleB
South Florida Regional	West Palm Beach, Florida	March 1 – 4	3653 Botcats, 695 Bison Robotics, 179 Children of the Swamp
Arkansas Regional	Searcy, Arkansas	March 1 – 4	4766 Team SCREAM Jr., 16 Bomb Squad, 6586 Tuskin' Raiders
Lake Superior Regional	Duluth, Minnesota	March 1 – 4	4011 Pi Robotics, 1714 MORE Robotics, 6045 Sabre Robotics
Northern Lights Regional	Duluth, Minnesota	March 1 – 4	4624 Rebel Alliance, 5913 Patriotics, 2052 KnightKrawler
Regional Monterrey	Monterrey, Nuevo León, Mexico	March 1 – 4	6702 Stingbots, 3478 Lambot, 4635 Botbusters
Utah Regional	West Valley City, Utah	March 1 – 4	9138 Robo Hawks, 4499 The Highlanders, 2240 Brute Force
Peachtree (PCH) District Albany Event	Albany, Georgia	March 2 – 4	5828 Westover Robotics, 6919 The Commodores, 1683 Techno Titans
FIRST In Michigan (FIM) District Escanaba Event	Escanaba, Michigan	March 2 – 4	3175 Knight Vision, 857 Superior Roboworks, 8382 The Pebbles-Robotics of Kingsford
FIM District Calvin University Event	Grand Rapids, Michigan	March 2 – 4	2771 Code Red Robotics the Stray Dogs, 3357 COMETS, 6081 Digital Dislocators
FIM District Jackson Event	Spring Arbor, Michigan	March 2 – 4	4453 The Red Hot Chili Bots, 302 The Dragons, 4381 Twisted Devils
FIM District Kettering University Event #1	Flint, Michigan	March 2 – 4	8728 Argonauts, 1506 Metal Muscle, 5460 Strike Zone
FIM District Milford Event	Highland Township, Michigan	March 2 – 4	9204 Hidden Treasures, 67 The HOT Team, 3538 RoboJackets
New England (NE) District Granite State Event	Salem, New Hampshire	March 2 – 4	5687 The Outliers, 3467 Windham Windup, 8023 LRTC Androscoggin Argonauts
FIRST In Texas (FIT) District Waco Event	Waco, Texas	March 2 – 4	2881 Lady Cans, 624 CRyptonite, 8088 Bionic Panthers
Pacific Northwest (PNW) District Clackamas Academy Event	Oregon City, Oregon	March 2 – 4	1540 Flaming Chickens, 3218 Panther Robotics, 5920 VIKotics
Hueneme Port Regional	Port Hueneme, California	March 2 – 5	4414 HighTide, 1678 Citrus Circuits, 696 Circuit Breakers
Izmir Regional	İzmir, İzmir Province, Turkey	March 3 – 5	CANCELED
FIRST Indiana (FIN) District Mishawaka Event	Mishawaka, Indiana	March 3 – 5	6721 Tindley Trailblazers, 3490 CyberTooth, 461 Westside Boiler Invasion
NE District SE Mass Event	Bridgewater, Massachusetts	March 3 – 5	3314 Mechanical Mustangs, 88 TJ², 4473 Delta Prime Robotics 4-H Team
FIRST North Carolina (FNC) District UNC Asheville Event	Asheville, North Carolina	March 3 – 5	8833 Buzz City Robotics, 4795 Eastbots, 587 The Hedgehogs
Ontario (ONT) District Georgian Event	Barrie, Ontario, Canada	March 3 – 5	1114 Simbotics, 7659 HNMCS Robotics, 4039 MakeShift Robotics
ONT District Newmarket Complex Event	Newmarket, Ontario, Canada	March 3 – 5	2056 OP Robotics, 2200 MMRambotics, 4951 CDS Cyclones
FIRST Mid-Atlantic (FMA) District Hatboro-Horsham Event	Horsham, Pennsylvania	March 3 – 5	5865 Peddie Robotics, 433 Firebirds, 2539 Krypton Cougars
FIRST Chesapeake (CHS) District Blacksburg Event	Blacksburg, Virginia	March 3 – 5	2363 Triple Helix Robotics, 401 Copperhead Robotics, 3373 Team RoboHawk
FIT District Dallas Event	Allen, Texas	March 3 – 5	5682 Equus Engineering, 2468 Team Appreciate, 3005 RoboChargers
PNW District Glacier Peak Event	Snohomish, Washington	March 3 – 5	2930 Sonic Squirrels, 2910 Jack in the Bot, 1778 Chill Out

=== Week 2 ===
Event	Location	Date	Champions
Midwest Regional	Chicago, Illinois	March 8 – 11	930 Mukwonago BEARs, 111 WildStang, 7460 Avi and Friends
St. Louis Regional	St. Louis, Missouri	March 8 – 11	6420 Fire Island Robotics, 4143 MARS/WARS, 1706 Ratchet Rockers
Great Northern Regional	Grand Forks, North Dakota	March 8 – 11	2883 F.R.E.D, 5172 Gators, 6146 Blackjacks
Oklahoma Regional	Shawnee, Oklahoma	March 8 – 11	2945 Steel Mustangs, 6244 Stealth Panther Robotics, 1619 Up-A-Creek Robotics
PCH District Dalton Event	Dalton, Georgia	March 9 – 11	8865 Dacula Droids, 2974 Walton Robotics, 6340 The Marist Manatees
FIM District Kettering University Event #2	Flint, Michigan	March 9 – 11	68 Truck Town Thunder, 494 Martians, 3098 Waterford Robotics
FIM District Lansing Event	Mason, Michigan	March 9 – 11	3655 Tractor Technicians, 6610 Robot Roll Call, 1481 The Riveters
FIM District St. Joseph Event	St. Joseph, Michigan	March 9 – 11	5843 Flurb, 3620 Average Joes, 5712 Hemlock's Gray Matter
FIT District Belton Event	Belton, Texas	March 9 – 11	5414 Pearadox, 3802 RoboPOP, 3743 Eagle Bots
PNW District Wilsonville Event	Wilsonville, Oregon	March 9 – 11	2471 Team Mean Machine, 1425 Error Code Xero, 6465 Mystic Biscuit
Central Valley Regional	Fresno, California	March 9 – 12	1323 MadTown Robotics, 973 Greybots, 6657 Arborbotics
Orange County Regional	Costa Mesa, California	March 9 – 12	987 HIGHROLLERS, 4415 EPIC Robotz, 4276 Surf City Vikings
Ventura County Regional	Port Hueneme, California	March 9 – 12	4414 HighTide, 4481 Team Rembrandts, 4 Team 4 ELEMENT
Southern Cross Regional	Wollongong, New South Wales, Australia	March 9 – 12	4613 Barker Redbacks, 5988 Narooma High RoboRebels, 6510 Pymble Pride
Mersin Regional	Mersin, Mersin Province, Turkey	March 10 – 12	CANCELED
NE District Waterbury Event	Waterbury, Connecticut	March 10 – 12	1071 Team MAX, 230 Gaelhawks, 8085 MOJO
CHS District Bethesda Event	Bethesda, Maryland	March 10 – 12	2900 Mighty Penguins, 1731 Fresta Valley Robotics Club, 4099 The Falcons
FIM District Wayne State University Event	Detroit, Michigan	March 10 – 12	1189 The Gearheads, 7769 The CREW, 6029 Railbots
FNC District Johnston County Event	Clayton, North Carolina	March 10 – 12	7671 Fire Hazard, 4829 Titanium Tigers, 435 Robodogs
FMA District Mount Olive Event	Mount Olive, New Jersey	March 10 – 12	1923 Midknight Inventors, 125 NUTRONs, 484 Roboforce
NE District Rhode Island Event	Glocester, Rhode Island	March 10 – 12	6329 The Bucks' Wrath, 6328 Mechanical Advantage, 509 Red Storm
PCH District Anderson Event	Anderson, South Carolina	March 10 – 12	4451 ROBOTZ Garage, 1102 M'Aiken Magic, 6961 SIbots
FIN District Princeton Event	Princeton, Indiana	March 10 – 12	7617 RoboBlazers, 4272 Maverick Robotics, 8116 Hatchet Robotics
FIT District Channelview Event	Channelview, Texas	March 10 – 12	118 Robonauts, 5427 Steel Talons, 5923 WildC.A.T.S.
ISR District Event #3	Ra'anana, Central District, Israel	March 12 – 14	6738 Excalibur, 4590 GreenBlitz, 3065 Jatt High School

=== Week 3 ===
Event	Location	Date	Champions
ISR District Event #4	Ra'anana, Central District, Israel	March 15 – 17	2230 General Angels, 2630 Thunderbolts, 4320 The Joker
Arizona East Regional	Scottsdale, Arizona	March 15 – 18	2659 RoboWarriors, 6036 Peninsula Robotics, 668 The Apes of Wrath
Heartland Regional	Olathe, Kansas	March 15 – 18	1987 Broncobots, 3184 Blaze Robotics, 2457 The Law
Orlando Regional	Orlando, Florida	March 15 – 18	179 Children of the Swamp, 180 S.P.A.M, 1902 Exploding Bacon
Central Illinois Regional	Peoria, Illinois	March 15 – 18	1756 Argos, 4143 MARS/ WARS, 4096 Ctrl-Z
Miami Valley Regional	Cincinnati, Ohio	March 15 – 18	695 Bison Robotics, 1732 Hilltopper Robotics, 1708 AMP'D Robotics
Magnolia Regional	Laurel, Mississippi	March 15 – 18	3039 Wildcat Robotics, 4336 Ramageddon Robotics, 5045 SpartaBot, 3753 BulahBots!
Finger Lakes Regional	Rochester, New York	March 15 – 18	1591 Greece Gladiators, 3015 Ranger Robotics, 3003 TAN(X), 6868 Cadet Robotics
Regional Puebla	Puebla de Zaragoza, Puebla, Mexico	March 15 – 18	6348 PrepaTec - HORUS, 6647 PrepaTec - VOLTEC Robotics, 3527 PrepaTec - Balam Esmeralda
Brazil Regional	Brasília, Distrito Federal, Brazil	March 10 – 12	7563 SESI SENAI MEGAZORD, 1156 Under Control, 9168 AGROBOT
FIT District Fort Worth Event	Fort Worth, Texas	March 16 – 18	3005 RoboChargers, 6672 Fusion Corps, 5613 ThunderDogs
FIM District Belleville Event	Belleville, Michigan	March 16 – 18	3668 TroBots, 4362 CSPA Gems, 9182 Tech Tr1be
NE District Western NE Event	Springfield, Massachusetts	March 16 – 18	176 Aces High, 195 CyberKnights, 8604 Alpha Centauri
FIM District Muskegon Event	Muskegon, Michigan	March 16 – 18	4381 Twisted Devils, 3538 RoboJackets, 6005 Cardinaltronics
FIT District San Antonio Event	San Antonio, Texas	March 16 – 18	2468 Team Appreciate, 2687 Team Apprentice, 8573 Rogue-Rangers LEGACY
FIM District Traverse City Event	Traverse City, Michigan	March 16 – 18	2834 Bionic Black Hawks, 3767 Titans, 7155 The Robotic Rangers, 5110 Robo Herd
FIM District Detroit Event	Detroit, Michigan	March 16 – 18	2337 EngiNERDs, 1701 RoboCubs, 7856 UPAD Fusion, 5756 REC'in Crew
PNW District SunDome Event	Yakima, Washington	March 16 – 18	2910 Jack in the Bot, 2147 CHUCK, 4125 Confidential
FIM District Standish-Sterling Event	Standish, Michigan	March 16 – 18	302 The Dragons, 1506 Metal Muscle, 6533 BeaverTech
San Francisco Regional	San Francisco, California	March 16 – 19	971 Spartan Robotics, 972 Iron Claw, 8016 Eco Robotics
Los Angeles Regional	El Segundo, California	March 16 – 19	687 The Nerd Herd, 5199 Robot Dolphins From Outer Space, 702 Bagel Bytes, 6833 Phoenix Robotics
NE District North Shore Event	Reading, Massachusetts	March 17 – 19	88 TJ², 1768 Nashoba Robotics, 6201 The Highlanders, 4311 Swampscott Currents
FMA District Springside Chestnut Hill Academy Event	Philadelphia, Pennsylvania	March 17 – 19	2539 Krypton Cougars, 341 Miss Daisy, 9027 PATH to Domination
FMA District Robbinsville Event	Robbinsville Township, New Jersey	March 17 – 19	3314 Mechanical Mustangs, 2495 Hive Mind, 9015 Questionable Engineering
ONT District Western University Engineering Event	London, Ontario, Canada	March 17 – 19	4907 Thunderstamps, 1325 Inverse Paradox, 5870 League of Logic
CHS District Portsmouth Event	Portsmouth, Virginia	March 17 – 19	2363 Triple Helix Robotics, 5804 TORCH, 539 Titan Robotics
ONT District Humber College Event	Toronto, Ontario, Canada	March 17 – 19	4476 W.A.F.F.L.E.S., 7558 ALT-F4, 5596 Wolverines
FNC District Wake County Event	Rolesville, North Carolina	March 17 – 19	7890 SeQuEnCe, 4795 Eastbots, 8757 GeodeBots
FNC District Mecklenburg County Event	Charlotte, North Carolina	March 17 – 19	1533 Triple Strange, 4290 Bots on Wheels, 6512 Coastal CATastrophe, 6214 PHEnix
PNW District Bonney Lake Event	Bonney Lake, Washington	March 17 – 19	1778 Chill Out, 2522 Royal Robotics, 3393 Horns of Havoc
PCH District Gwinnett Event	Lawrenceville, Georgia	March 17 – 19	1771 Tigerbytes, 4188 Columbus Space Program, 2415 WiredCats
CHS District Alexandria Event	Alexandria, Virginia	March 17 – 19	8592 Newton², 1727 REX, 2421 RTR Team Robotics

=== Week 4 ===
Event	Location	Date	Champions
Long Island Regional #1	Hempstead, New York	March 20 – 22	3015 Ranger Robotics, 1468 Hicksville J-Birds, 2875 CyberHawks
FIRST Israel District Championship	Jerusalem	March 20 – 23	1577 Steampunk, 1690 Orbit, 5135 Black Unicorns
Wisconsin Regional	Milwaukee, Wisconsin	March 22 – 25	1732 Hilltopper Robotics, 1714 MORE Robotics, 8847 Milwaukee Cyber Cheese
Iowa Regional	Cedar Falls, Iowa	March 22 – 25	6424 Stealth Panther Robotics, 4329 Lutheran Robotics, 1785 Blue Springs Robocats
Hawaii Regional	Honolulu, Hawaii	March 22 – 25	4253 Raid Zero, 359 Hawaiian Kids, 2445 RoboKAP
Regional Laguna	Torreón, Coahuila, Mexico	March 22 – 25	4400 Cerbotics - Peñoles, 4635 PrepaTec - Botbusters, 3526 PrepaTec - Blue Ignition
Colorado Regional	Denver, Colorado	March 22 – 25	1339 AngelBotics, 4499 The Highlanders, 1799 Wired-Up!
Central Missouri Regional	Sedalia, Missouri	March 22 – 25	3184 Blaze Robotics, 4766 Team SCREAM Jr., 5809 The Jesubots 5809
Arizona West Regional	Glendale, Arizona	March 22 – 25	5199 Robot Dolphins From Outer Space, 498 The Cobra Commanders, 1165 Team Paradise
Long Island Regional #2	Hempstead, New York	March 23 – 25	694 StuyPulse, 870 TEAM R.I.C.E., 533 The PSIcotics
PNW District Oregon State Fairgrounds Event	Salem, Oregon	March 23 – 25	2521 SERT, 2990 Hotwire, 1359 Scalawags
PCH District Hartsville Event	Hartsville, South Carolina	March 23 – 25	4451 ROBOTZ Garage, 1102 M'Aiken Magic, 4748 M'Aiken Magic
FIM District Midland Event	Midland, Michigan	March 23 – 25	5216 E-Ville Empire, 5231 The Radical Jays, 5114 Titanium Tigers
FIM District West Michigan Event	Allendale, Michigan	March 23 – 25	4855 Ramageddon, 3357 COMETS, 27 Team RUSH
FIM District LSSU Event	Sault Ste. Marie, Michigan	March 23 – 25	3655 Tractor Technicians, 7768 The AutoMatons, 4392 The Deceivers
ONT District University of Waterloo Event #1	Waterloo, Ontario, Canada	March 23 – 25	Simbotics 1114, 8764 Thunder Robotics, 3683 Team DAVE
FIT District Houston Event	Houston, Texas	March 23 – 25	3847 Spectrum -△◅, 2585 Impact, 118 Robonauts
FIM District Lakeview Event #1	Battle Creek, Michigan	March 23 – 25	4810 I AM Robot, 9312 NERD Spark, 5675 WiredCats
PCH District Carrollton Event	Carrollton, Georgia	March 23 – 25	2974 Walton Robotics, 6340 The Marist Manatees, 1311 Kell Robotics
San Diego Regional	La Jolla, California	March 23 – 26	973 Greybots, 1538 The Holy Cows, 4419 Team Rewind
Minnesota North Star Regional	La Crosse, Wisconsin	March 23 – 26	5232 Talons, 876 Thunder Robotics, 4693 Axiomatic Aftermath
Tallahassee Regional	Tallahassee, Florida	March 23 – 26	6722 LED Robotics, 180 S.P.A.M, 4592 M3 Mighty Mechanical Mustangs
Sacramento Regional	Davis, California	March 23 – 26	254 The Cheesy Poofs, 1678 Citrus Circuits, 3189 Circuit Breakers
FNC District UNC Pembroke Event	Pembroke, North Carolina	March 24 – 26	4828 RoboEagles, 2642 Pitt Pirates, 7763 Carrborobotics
NE District UNH Event	Durham, New Hampshire	March 24 – 26	133 B.E.R.T., 6329 The Bucks' Wrath, 7913 "Bear"ly Functioning
FIM District Troy Event #1	Troy, Michigan	March 24 – 26	67 The HOT Team, 1718 The Fighting Pi, 8115 Platinum Peacocks
FIN District Tippecanoe Event	Lafayette, Indiana	March 24 – 26	461 Westside Boiler Invasion, 328 Penn Robotics Golden Rooks, 7457 suPURDUEper Robotics
FMA District Warren Hills Event	Washington, New Jersey	March 24 – 26	3142 Aperture, 7045 MCCrusaders, 555 Montclair Robotics
CHS District Timonium Event	Timonium, Maryland	March 24 – 26	1629 Garrett Coalition (GaCo), 836 The RoboBees, 6863 Squirrels, 9072 TigerBots
PNW District Sammamish Event	Bellevue, Washington	March 24 – 26	5827 Code Purple, 2910 Jack in the Bot, 7461 Sushi Squad
Istanbul Regional	Istanbul, Istanbul Province, Turkey	March 24 – 26	9077 The Crown, 7748 TECHTOLIA ROBOTICS, 8015 The Cheetahs
NE District Greater Boston Event	Revere, Massachusetts	March 24 – 26	125 NUTRONs, 3467 Windham Windup, 8626 Cyber Sailors
FMA District Seneca Event	Tabernacle, New Jersey	March 24 – 26	5895 Peddie Robotics, 1807 Redbird Robotics, 5457 Falcobots
ONT District North Bay Event	North Bay, Ontario, Canada	March 24 – 26	6864 Gryphtech Robotics, 4152 Hoya Robotics, 1305 Ice Cubed
CHS District Glen Allen Event	Glen Allen, Virginia	March 24 – 26	401 Copperhead Robotics, 384 SPARKY, 611 Saxons
FIM District Lakeview Event #2	Battle Creek, Michigan	March 25 – 27	4381 Twisted Devils, 5559 Gear Grinders, 2767 Stryke Force

=== Week 5 ===
Event	Location	Date	Champions
Bosphorus Regional	Istanbul, Istanbul Province, Turkey	March 27 – 29	6838 X-SHARC, 7444 Moon Star Robotics, 9264 HUNTERS
New York Tech Valley Regional	Albany, New York	March 29 – April 1	3015 Ranger Robotics, 1796 RoboTigers, 4930 Electric Mayhem
Buckeye Regional	Cleveland, Ohio	March 29 – April 1	4028 The Beak Squad, 695 Bison Robotics, 5667 The Digital Eagles
Festival de Robotique Regional	Trois-Rivières, Quebec, Canada	March 29 – April 1	3990 Tech For Kids, 3996 RIKITIK, 5618 PLS
Smoky Mountains Regional	Knoxville, Tennessee	March 29 – April 1	2451 PWNAGE, 1730 Team Driven, 6517 So-Kno Robo
Bayou Regional	Kenner, Louisiana	March 29 – April 1	4522 Team SCREAM, 4635 PrepaTec - Botbusters, 2080 Torotics
Minnesota 10,000 Lakes Regional	Minneapolis, Minnesota	March 29 – April 1	2052 KnightKrawler, 5913 Patriotics, 7258 Robolobos - Hiawatha Collegiate
Greater Kansas City Regional	Lee's Summit, Missouri	March 29 – April 1	4213 MetalCow Robotics, 1987 Broncobots, 2359 RoboLobos
Seven Rivers Regional	La Crosse, Wisconsin	March 29 – April 1	2338 Gear It Forward, 111 WildStang, 5586 Bond Brigade
Idaho Regional	Nampa, Idaho	March 29 – April 1	3647 Millennium Falcons, 4175 Coded Summit, 6036 Peninsula Robotics
Aerospace Valley Regional	Lancaster, California	March 29 – April 1	7157 μBotics, 4414 HighTide, 7042 Poly Rabbotics
Monterey Bay Regional	Seaside, California	March 29 – April 1	1323 MadTown Robotics, 5940 BREAD, 6998 Unipards
Las Vegas Regional	Las Vegas, Nevada	March 29 – April 1	4270 Crusaders, 359 Hawaiian Kids, 9287 Bionic Bengals
PCH District Macon Event	Macon, Georgia	March 30 – April 1	4730 Terminators, 6919 The Commodores, 6829 Ignite Robotics
FIN District Greenwood Event	Greenwood, Indiana	March 30 – April 1	5188 Area 5188: Classified Robotics, 1555 Cryofrost, 1501 Team THRUST
FIM District Kentwood Event	Kentwood, Michigan	March 30 – April 1	4391 BraveBots, 2075 Enigma Robotics, 9215 T-Town Tech
FIM District Livonia Event	Livonia, Michigan	March 30 – April 1	3641 The Flying Toasters, 5907 CC Shambots, 6532 TechnoPaths
FIM District Macomb Community College Event	Warren, Michigan	March 30 – April 1	6085 Green Devil Bots, 3175 Knight Vision, 5460 Strike Zone
FIM District Saline Event	Ann Arbor, Michigan	March 30 – April 1	3322 Eagle Evolution, 6081 Digital Dislocators, 8895 Redwolves Robotics
FIM District Troy Event #2	Kentwood, Michigan	March 30 – April 1	5612 Robo-Raptors, 1684 The Chimeras, 7211 Hollywood
ONT District Windsor Essex Great Lakes Event	Windsor, Ontario, Canada	March 30 – April 1	4678 CyberCavs, 5596 Wolverines, 4907 Thunderstamps
FIT District Amarillo Event	Amarillo, Texas	March 30 – April 1	4206 Robo Vikes, 3676 Redshift Robotics, 1745 The P-51 Mustangs
NE District Hartford Event	Hartford, Connecticut	March 31 – April 2	195 CyberKnights, 230 Gaelhawks, 7694 THE IRON LIONS
NE District WPI Event	Worcester, Massachusetts	March 31 – April 2	2370 IBOTS, 6763 FUSION, 1757 Wolverines
FIRST North Carolina District Championship	Greenville, North Carolina	March 31 – April 2	3229 Hawktimus Prime, 7890 SeQuEnCe, 587 The Hedgehogs
FMA District Montgomery Event	Montgomery, New Jersey	March 31 – April 2	1923 The MidKnight Inventors, 1403 Cougar Robotics, 8714 Robo Griffins'
ONT District McMaster University Event	Hamilton, Ontario, Canada	March 31 – April 2	2056 OP Robotics, 1325 Inverse Paradox, 4992 Sparbotics
FMA District Bensalem Event	Bensalem, Pennsylvania	March 31 – April 2	272 Cyber Crusaders, 1391 The Metal Moose, 5624 TIGER TECH Robotics
FIT District Space City Event	Houston, Texas	March 31 – April 2	8144 Red Chair Robotics, 6357 The Spring Konstant, 231 High Voltage
PNW District Auburn Event	Auburn, Washington	March 31 – April 2	2046 Bear Metal, 3663 CPR - Cedar Park Robotics, 5683 Riverside Robotics

=== Week 6 ===
Event	Location	Date	Champions
FIRST Chesapeake District Championship	Fairfax, Virginia	April 5 – 8	2199 Robo-Lions, 2363 Triple Helix Robotics, 1731 Fresta Valley Robotics Club
Peachtree District Championship	Emerson, Georgia	April 5 – 8	281 The Green Villains, 1746 OTTO, 8736 The Mechanisms
FIRST Mid-Atlantic District Championship	Bethlehem, Pennsylvania	April 5 – 8	3314 Mechanical Mustangs, 5895 Peddie Robotics, 3142 Aperture
New England FIRST District Championship	West Springfield, Massachusetts	April 5 – 8	1757 Wolverines, 176 Aces High, 1699 Robocats
New York City Regional	New York, New York	April 5 – 8	8159 Golden Horn, 1796 RoboTigers, 694 StuyPulse
Greater Pittsburgh Regional	Pittsburgh, Pennsylvania	April 5 – 8	1591 Greece Gladiators, 930 Mukwonago BEARs, 2656 Quasics
Rocket City Regional	Huntsville, Alabama	April 5 – 8	7072 O.G.R.E., 4499 The Highlanders, 3937 Breakaway
Green Country Regional	Tulsa, Oklahoma	April 5 – 8	1561 ROBODUCKS, 6424 Stealth Panther Robotics, 2333 S.C.R.E.E.C.H.
Silicon Valley Regional	San Jose, California	April 5 – 8	254 The Cheesy Poofs, 1678 Citrus Circuits, 2489 The Insomniacs, 100 The Wildhats
FIRST in Texas District Championship	Houston, Texas	April 5 – 8	118 Robonauts, 3005 RoboChargers, 8576 Golden Warriors Robotics
FIRST Ontario District Championship	Hamilton, Ontario, Canada	April 5 – 8	2056 OP Robotics, 2200 MMRambotics, 4992 Sparbotics
Pacific Northwest FIRST District Championship	Cheney, Washington	April 5 – 8	2910 Jack in the Bot, 2046 Bear Metal, 948 NRG (Newport Robotics Group), 1983 Skunk Works Robotics
FIRST in Michigan District Championship	University Center, Michigan	April 6 – 8	6090 Wayland Wildcats, 1506 Metal Muscle, 217 ThunderChickens
FIRST Indiana District Championship	Anderson, Indiana	April 6 – 8	7617 RoboBlazers, 5010 Tiger Dynasty, 7657 ThunderBots

=== FIRST Championship ===
Event	Location	Date
FIRST Championship	Houston, Texas	April 19 – 22

== FIRST Championship Results ==
The following tables show the winners of each division and the divisional playoff results.

=== Division Winners ===
Division	Captain	1st Pick	2nd Pick	3rd Pick
Archimedes	8085	6328	972	687
Newton	4329	1746	3184	5804
Galileo	1678	3476	461	59
Hopper	1323	4414	4096	2609
Curie	6329	148	818	302
Milstein	3655	6672	5895	5419
Daly	5460	125	870	2590
Johnson	2075	973	9312	4607

=== Divisional Playoff ===
==== Elimination Bracket ====
As with all other events this season, the Championship divisional playoff follows a double elimination format. All matchups are best-of-one with the exception of Einstein Finals, which is a best-of-three series.

Upper round 1	Upper round 2	Upper final	Einstein Finals
Lower round 1	Lower round 2	Lower round 3	Lower final

==== Einstein Finals ====
Division	Final 1	Final 2	Wins
Hopper	213	209	2
Daly	141	208	0
