= Halton District School Board =

School board in Ontario, Canada

Location
- J.W. Singleton Education Centre; 2050 Guelph Line; Burlington, Ontario New Street Education Centre; 3250 New Street; Burlington, Ontario Burlington, Halton Hills, Milton and Oakville Canada
- Coordinates: 43.3430°N 79.7770°W

District information
- Superintendent: Dr. Dean Barnes Dr. Tara Connor; Aiman Flahat; Jennifer Fowler; Nick Frankovich; Ian Gaudet; Allison Ippolito; Elanor McIntosh; Roxana Negoi; Brent Coakwell; Claire Proteau; Colette Ruddock Jonathan Shoss
- Chair of the board: Amy Collard
- Director of education: Curtis Ennis
- Schools: 102; 84 elementary, 18 secondary
- Budget: CA$664 million

Other information
- Elected trustees: Joanna Oliver Navneed Ahmed; Donna Danielli; Jeanne Gray; Robbie Brydon; Margo Horne; Xin Yi Zhang; Audrey Wubbenhorst; Carole Baxter; Tanya Rocha
- Student trustees (2025-2026): Kaitlyn Hou; Jay Xu
- Website: www.hdsb.ca

The Halton District School Board serves public school students throughout Halton Region, including the municipalities of Burlington, Halton Hills, Milton and Oakville. Its administration area is to the southwest of the city of Toronto. In 2025, it served almost 68,000 students, excluding those in adult, alternative, and Community Education programs.

== History ==
Education in the former Halton County was previously governed by a framework of boards for various high school districts and public school districts associated with them. In 1967, as a result of initiatives undertaken by then Minister of Education Bill Davis, work was begun to amalgamate all boards on a county-wide level throughout the Province, and such a move was recommended to the Halton County Council that year for its approval. The move was opposed by the southern boards of education in Burlington and Oakville, but that was overruled upon passage of mandatory legislation by the Legislative Assembly of Ontario in 1968.

The Board was constituted as the Halton County Board of Education, which was established on January 1, 1969. When the County was replaced by the Regional Municipality of Halton, the Board became the Halton Board of Education.

As part of the province-wide restructuring of Ontario's school boards as a consequence of the passage of the Fewer School Boards Act, 1997, the English-language Public District School Board No. 20 was created to take over the Region's schools. It was merged with the former Board at the beginning of 1998, and was renamed as the "Halton District School Board" in 1999.

In 2023, the Board was taken to court in a civil case regarding a lawsuit against former school teacher, Barbara Joan Baxter, who convicted of sexually abusing five students when she taught at Pineland Public School.

== Schools ==
The Board operates 76 elementary schools, and 17 secondary schools, which are organized into the following areas:

- East Area (Oakville)
- North Area (Halton Hills and Milton)
- West Area (Burlington)

Secondary school enrolment and Fraser Institute provincial rankings are as follows:

HDSB secondary schools (2018 Fraser Institute Rankings)
Name	Area	Enrolment	1-year ranking of 747	5-year ranking of 623
Abbey Park High School	East	954	2	9
Garth Webb Secondary School	East	1092	33	42
Iroquois Ridge High School	East	1358	25	12
Oakville Trafalgar High School	East	1245	11	9
T. A. Blakelock High School	East	1125	59	70
White Oaks Secondary School	East	1865	43	36
Acton District High School	North	453	338	279
Craig Kielburger Secondary School	North	1499	175	148
Georgetown District High School	North	1654	175	120
Milton District High School	North	921	115	120
Aldershot High School	West	436	156	148
Burlington Central High School	West	593	445	279
Dr. Frank J. Hayden Secondary School	West	1425	115	–
Lester B. Pearson High School	West	416	68	87
M.M. Robinson High School	West	740	462	416
Nelson High School	West	996	47	42
Robert Bateman High School	West	797	413	262

== Trustees ==
=== Student Trustees ===
As required by the Ontario Ministry of Education, the following student trustees have been named to serve on the Board:

Student trustees at the HDSB, by term
Term	Trustees
2025 - 2026	Jay Xu (White Oaks Secondary School) Kaitlyn Hou (Abbey Park High School)
2024- 2025	Charlie Ochu (Oakville Trafalgar High School) Kaitlyn Hou (Abbey Park High School)
2023 - 2024	Sultan Alimzhanov (Abbey Park High School) Shrena Sribalan (Craig Kielburger Secondary School)
2022 - 2023	Ethan Ruggiero (Dr. Frank J. Hayden Secondary School) Cindy Wang (Oakville Trafalgar High School)
2021 - 2022	Vanditha (Vandy) Widyalankara (White Oaks Secondary School) Kacy Bao (Milton District High School)
2020 - 2021	Vanditha (Vandy) Widyalankara (White Oaks Secondary School) Evan Taylor (Milton District High School)
2019 - 2020	Matthew Burnes (Oakville Trafalgar High School); Olivia Lau (White Oaks Secondary School)
2018-2019	Connor Clark (Nelson High School); Kevin Meng (White Oaks Secondary School)
2017-2018	Dasha Metropolitansky (White Oaks Secondary School); Muqtasid Mansoor (Milton District High School)
2016-2017	Dasha Metropolitansky (White Oaks Secondary School); Zaid Haj Ali (Abbey Park High School)
2014-2016	Sophie Schneider (Abbey Park High School); Jovan Sahi (Iroquois Ridge High School)
2013-2014	Allison Zheng (Craig Kielburger Secondary School); Zoha Khan (Iroquois Ridge High School)
2012-2013	Shaan Bhambra (Robert Bateman High School); Arjun Dhanjal (Iroquois Ridge High School)
2011-2012	Jason Earl (Milton District High School); Rudy Unni (Robert Bateman High School)
2010-2011	Jason Earl (Milton District High School); Haniya Khan (Iroquois Ridge High School)
2009-2010	Laura McVey (Abbey Park High School); Chaitanya Dogra (Iroquois Ridge High School)
2008-2009	Laura McVey (Abbey Park High School); Nupur Dogra (Iroquois Ridge High School)
2007-2008	Jason Karmody (Aldershot High School); Jonathan Yantzi (Burlington Central High School)
2006-2007	Russell Baker (Abbey Park High School); Simon Beck (Iroquois Ridge High School)
2005-2006	Amreen Azam (Iroquois Ridge High School)

=== Board of Trustee Chairs & Vice-Chairs ===
The Halton District School Board's Board of Trustees annually elect its chair and a vice-chair at its Annual Organization Meetings (AOM). The current chair of the Halton District School is Margo Shuttleworth and the current vice-chair is Tracey Ehl Harrison.

Term	Board of Trustee Chair	Board of Trustees Vice-Chair
2022 - 2023	Margo Shuttleworth	Tracey Ehl Harrison
2020 - 2021 2019 - 2020 2018 - 2019 2017 - 2018	Andréa Grebenc	Tracey Ehl Harrison
2016 - 2017 2015 - 2016 2014 - 2015 2013 - 2014	Kelly Amos	

== Other ==
The Board also operates the following specialized facilities:

- Gary Allan High School - for adult, alternative and Community Education programs.
- Syl Apps School

== Programming ==
The Pathways programme encourages all post-secondary options, from apprenticeship, to college, to university, to the workplace. The Board has also introduced specialist high skills majors and other unique programs for students, including fully online high school credits.

The International Baccalaureate programme is offered at:

- Georgetown District High School
- Burlington Central High School
- White Oaks Secondary School
- Craig Kielburger Secondary School (IBDP candidate school)

== See also ==
- Halton Catholic District School Board
- Ontario Student Trustees' Association
- List of school districts in Ontario
- List of high schools in Ontario
