= Lester B. Pearson High School (Burlington) =

Location
- 1433 Headon Road; Burlington, Ontario, L7M 1V7; Canada; 43.37389°N 79.80785°W

Information
- School type: Public
- Motto: Nulli Secundus (Second to none)
- Founded: 1976
- Closed: 2018
- School board: Halton District School Board
- Area trustee: Richelle Papin
- Principal: Loraine Fedurco
- Grades: 9 - 12
- Enrolment: 479 (2014)
- Language: English, French (Immersion)
- Area: North Burlington
- Colours: Red and White
- Mascot: The Maple Leaf
- Team name: The Patriots
- Website: lbp.hdsb.ca

Lester B. Pearson High School was a high school located in Burlington, Ontario, Canada, administered by the Halton District School Board. Founded in 1976, the school is named after former Prime Minister Lester B. Pearson. Pearson closed at the end of the 2017–2018 school year, with staff and students moving to M. M. Robinson High School as of September 2018.

== Sporting success ==
The high school has had numerous sporting successes. The school won a Halton title in men's hockey in 2006. The men's basketball team has had success with back to back Halton titles in 1992 and 1993, 3 repetitive Halton titles from 2005 to 2007 and one in 1988, with 3 Peel-GHAC championships and subsequent appearances at the OFSAA provincial championship tournament in 1988, 1993, 2006 and 2007. The rugby team has had OFSAA appearances numerous times for both senior girls and boys. In 2009 the Junior Boys Basketball Team won the Halton Boys Regional Basketball Championship. In 2011, the Senior Girls soccer team won the Halton Girls Championship and placed third at the 2011 OFSAA Championships. The Junior Girls Volleyball also won their championship in the same year. Also the Sr. Boys Rugby Team went to OFSAA for a 2nd year in a row and getting their first OFSAA win in a friendly match. In 2012, the Senior Boys Basketball, Senior Boys Volleyball, and Varsity Boys Rugby won championships in their respective sports. Varsity Boys Hockey, Girls Junior, Senior Volleyball, and Girls Softball made it to the championship games but unfortunately fell short. In 2002 the men's baseball team won Pearson's only OFSAA triple A championship at Skydome in Toronto. With continued changing of school boundaries and with the opening of Dr Frank Hayden S.S in 2013 Pearson's population dropped almost 200 students, but many of its teams were to advance to many and win OFSAA titles (2015–2018).

The official Pearson cheer was "L.B.P., What?!", and its school colours were red and white.

== Notable programs ==
The school offered extra-curricular activities, international trips (Spain, France, New Zealand) and participated in the Burlington-Apeldoorn Youth Exchange until 2017 when the HDSB put a moratorium on all student billeting exchanges.

Pearson also raised $9,000 to build a school in Sierra Leone, Africa with their Social Justice Program run by Judith Genis and Tanya Andersen. It has also raised money for the Malala Fund and every year, a Pearson student won a $1000 scholarship for SJ's successful Coats for Kids Campaign. Social Justice worked hard the past three years to educate the student body about newcomers to Canada, refugees and indigenous people's rights and violations thereof. It also organized the "Pearson Packs for Teenagers" for the Milton Welcome Centre.

Pearson was the successful host of a new pilot program, "Period Zero Fitness". This program had over 50 grade 10-12 students enrolled. This program will be continued at MM Robinson High School effective September 2018.

=== French program ===
Lester B. Pearson is the only school in the HDSB which featured the French Extended program, a program carried from Sir. Ernest Macmillan, which offered a further in-depth French program than core French, allowing students from grade 7 & 8 at Sir. Ernest Macmillan to carry on their French education through grades 9–12, with the opportunity to receive the Canadian bilingualism certificate.

== Notable alumni ==
- Ryan Gosling, actor, dropped out
- Sarah Harmer, singer/songwriter
- David Scearce, screenwriter
- Doug Saunders, journalist for The Globe and Mail
- Chris Gardiner, visual artist/DJ

== See also ==
- List of high schools in Ontario
