= E. C. Drury High School =

Ernest C. Drury High School
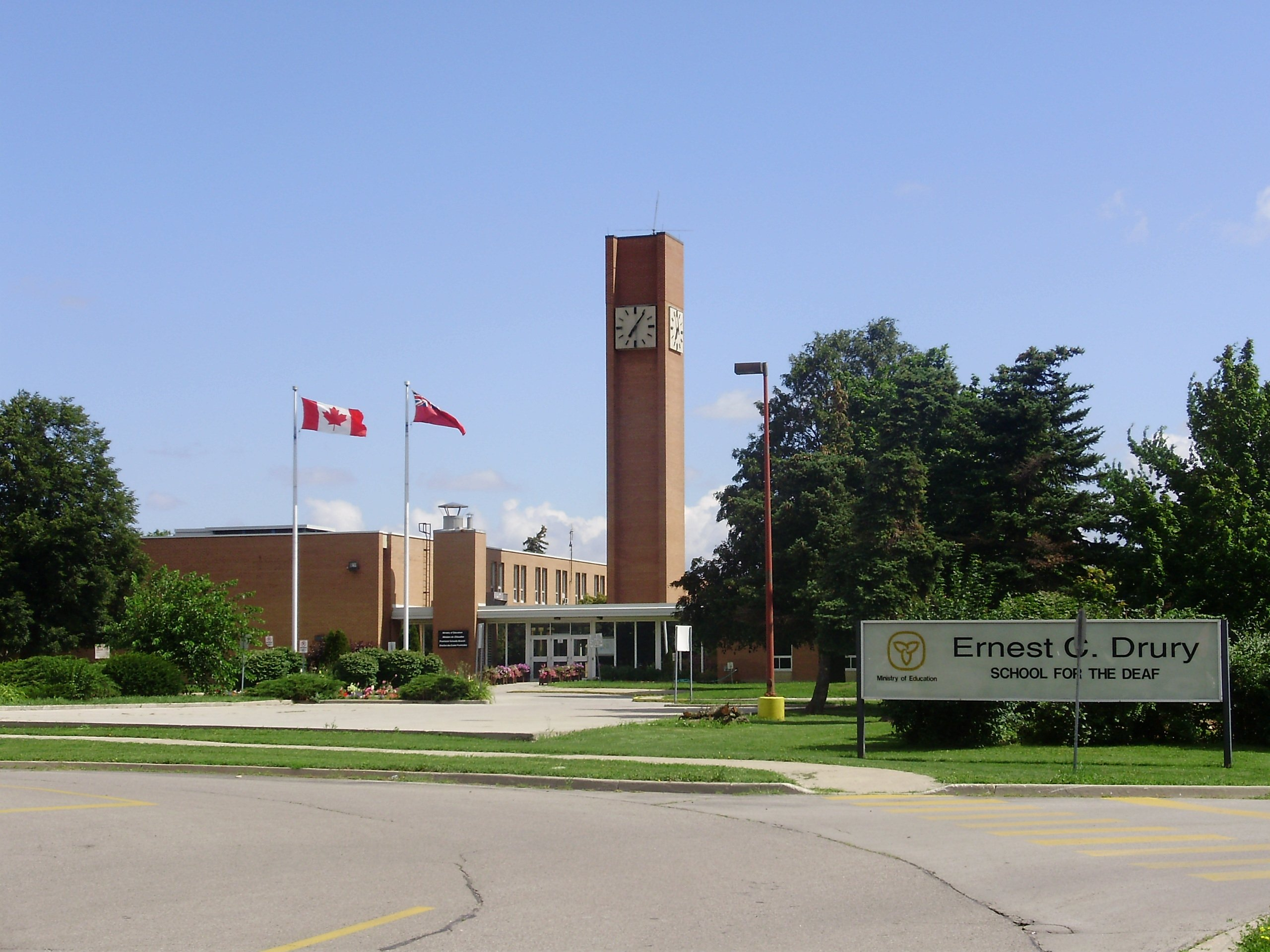

Location
- 225 Ontario Street South; Milton, Ontario, L9T4N5; Canada; 43.5145°N 79.8707°W

Information
- School type: Secondary School
- Motto: Home of the Spartans, Serious About Success
- Founded: 1980
- Closed: 2012
- School board: Halton District School Board
- Superintendent: Yaw Obeng
- Area trustee: Donna Danielli
- Administrator: Donna Taylor
- Grades: 9-12
- Enrollment: 943 (Feb.27, 2012)
- Language: English and American Sign Language (ASL)
- Area: Halton
- Colours: Green and Yellow
- Mascot: Spartan
- Team name: E.C. Drury Spartans
- Website: pdsbnet.ca

The Ernest C. Drury High School was a school in Milton, Ontario, Canada, for students in grades 9-12. The school closed in June 2012 and became Craig Kielburger Secondary School at a new location in Milton.

The same campus also houses the E. C. Drury School for the Deaf, a secondary school with residential and day programs for Deaf and Hard-of-Hearing students. The school also offers classes for the disabled, a day care center, several board offices, and numerous trade programs. This school was operated by the Provincial Schools branch of the Ministry of Education in Ontario. The Provincial schools will remain at their current address after June 2012 retaining the EC Drury name.

The school was named after Ernest Charles Drury who was Premier of Ontario from 1919 to 1923.

== Academics ==
EC Drury High School offered a full range of courses in all 4 pathways; University, College, Apprenticeship and Workplace. As well, The Centre provided education and training for developmentally challenged students.

=== Special programs ===
E.C. Drury offered several specialist programs organized by the HDSB Pathways Department.

Specialist High Skills Majors

- Business
- Green Industries
- Hospitality
- Information and Communications Technology
- Musical Theatre

Ontario Youth Apprenticeship (OYAP)

- Hair Styling

== Sports teams ==
The EC Drury Spartan Wrestling Team has developed a tradition of winning team and individual medals at regional (GHAC) and provincial (OFSAA) tournaments since 1987.

In 2017, the Spartans wrestling team was inducted into the Milton Sports Hall of Fame.

== Arts ==
The arts department at EC Drury had extra curricular activities including:

- Glee Club
- Drum Line
- Guitar Club
