= Robert Bateman (painter) =

Canadian naturalist and painter (born 1930)

Robert Bateman OC OBC RCA
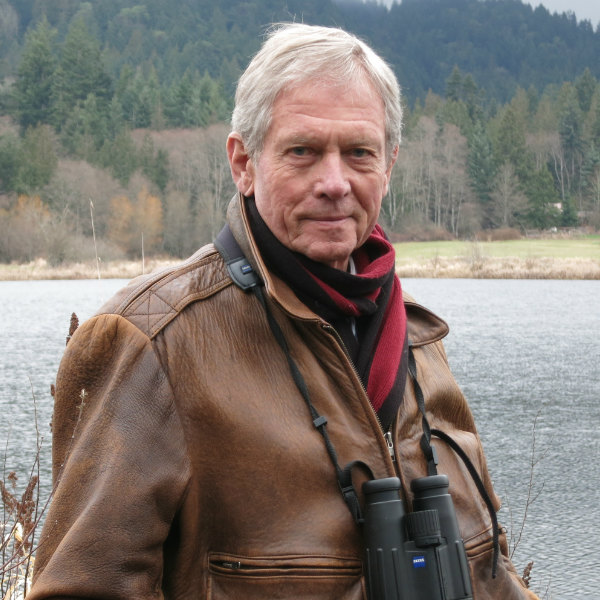
- Born: Robert McLellan Bateman; 24 May 1930 (age 96); Toronto, Ontario, Canada
- Known for: Painter; wildlife
- Spouses: Suzanne Bowerman (m. 1960, divorced); Birgit Freybe (m. 1975)
- Children: 5

Robert McLellan Bateman OC OBC RCA (born 24 May 1930) is a painter, naturalist, educator, and conservation advocate from Canada. He makes realist depictions of wildlife and natural environments. His work has been exhibited internationally and has been associated with environmental education and conservation initiatives. He is regarded as one of Canada's most widely recognized artists.

== Early life and education ==
Bateman was born in Toronto, Ontario, on 24 May 1930. As a child, he developed interests in both drawing and natural history, spending time observing wildlife and studying specimens at the Royal Ontario Museum. These interests would later become central themes in his artistic work.

== Teaching career ==
Following his studies, Bateman worked as a secondary-school teacher of geography and art. He taught for approximately twenty years, including a period teaching in Nigeria. During these years he continued painting and travelling, including a world tour in 1957–58 that broadened his interest in cultural and environmental heritage.

== Artistic career ==
During the 1970s and 1980s Bateman's wildlife paintings gained increasing public recognition. His work is characterized by detailed depictions of animals within broader environmental settings, often emphasizing habitat as the wildlife itself. Rather than presenting animals as isolated subjects.

His paintings have been exhibited in museums and galleries throughout Canada, the United States, and other countries. In 1987, the Smithsonian Institution's National Museum of Natural History presented ''Portraits of Nature: Paintings by Robert Bateman'', a major exhibition consisting of 110 paintings.

== Conservation and environmental advocacy ==
Bateman has served in advisory and honorary roles for a number of environmental organizations, including the North American Native Plant Society. He has also been a board member of the Jane Goodall Institute of Canada and an honorary life member of the Audubon Society and the Sierra Club.

== Foundation ==
In 2012, Bateman established the Bateman Foundation, a charitable organization dedicated to promoting nature education through art. The foundation develops educational programs, exhibitions, and resources designed to encourage environmental awareness and outdoor learning.

== Personal life ==
Bateman married Suzanne Bowerman in 1960, and the couple had three children. Following their divorce, he married photographer and conservation advocate Birgit Freybe in 1975. They subsequently had two children.

== Honours and awards ==
- Life Member, Royal Canadian Academy of Arts
- Queen Elizabeth II Silver Jubilee Medal, 1977
- Officer of the Order of Canada, 1984
- Member of Honour Award, World Wildlife Fund, 1985 (presented by the Prince Philip)
- Society of Animal Artists Award of Excellence 1979, 1980, 1981, 1986, 1990, 2008; Lifetime Achievement 2010
- Lescarbot Award presented by the Canadian Government, 1992
- Rachel Carson Award presented by the Society of Environmental Toxicology and Chemistry, Washington D.C., 1996
- Order of British Columbia, 2001
- Rungius Medal presented by the National Museum of Wildlife Art, 2001
- Queen Elizabeth II Golden Jubilee Medal, 2002
- Roland Michener Conservation Award presented by the Canadian Wildlife Federation, 2003
- Ideas for Life Award, Canadian Environment Awards, 2006
- Human Rights Defender Award presented by Amnesty International, 2007
- Niagara Escarpment Lifetime Achievement Award, 2009
- Royal Canadian Geographical Society Gold Medal, 2013
- World Ecology Award, University of Missouri-St. Louis, 2015.
- International Brandwein Medal, Brandwein Institute, 2017
- Jay N. Ding Darling Award, The Wildlife Society, 2017

== Books ==
- The Art of Robert Bateman. Biography by Ramsay Derry. Madison Press Books, 1981. (French ed. 1982, German ed. 1984)
- The World of Robert Bateman. Biography by Ramsay Derry. Madison Press Books, 1984
- Robert Bateman: An Artist in Nature. Biography by Rick Archbold. Madison Press Books, 1990
- Robert Bateman: Natural Worlds. Text by Rick Archbold. Madison Press Books, 1996
- Safari. Robert Bateman and Rick Archibald. 1998
- Thinking Like a Mountain. Robert Bateman and Rick Archbold. Penguin Books, 2000
- Birds. Robert Bateman and Kathryn Dean. Madison Press Books, 2002
- Backyard Birds. Robert Bateman with Ian Coutts. Madison Press Books, 2005
- Birds of Prey. Robert Bateman with Nancy Kovacs. Madison Press Books, 2007
- Polar Worlds. Robert Bateman with Nancy Kovacs. Madison Press Books, 2008
- Vanishing Habitats. Robert Bateman with Nancy Kovacs. Madison Press Books, 2010
- Bateman: New Works. Greystone Books, 2010
- Hope & Wild Apples. Bateman Foundation, 2012
- Sight Unseen. Paul Gilbert, Bateman Foundation, 2014
- Life Sketches: A Memoir. Simon & Schuster, 2015
- Robert Bateman's Canada. Simon & Schuster, 2017

== Films ==
- “Down to Earth”, Zephyr Films, 2001
- "Robert Bateman", Art Gallery of Greater Victoria, 1994
- "A Day in the Life of Robert Bateman", Canadian Broadcasting Corporation, 1985
- "Robert Bateman - Artist/Naturalist", Canadian Broadcasting Corporation, Spectrum, 1984 (Donna Lu Wigmore, producer)
- "Robert Bateman - A Celebration of Nature", Canadian Broadcasting Corporation. Take 30, 1983 (Brigitte Berman, producer)
- "The Nature Art of Robert Bateman", Eco-Art Productions, 1981 (Norm Lightfoot, producer)
- "Images of the Wild: A Portrait of Robert Bateman", National Film Board of Canada, 1978 (Norm Lightfoot, director; Beryl Fox, producer)
- "Robert Bateman", Canadian Broadcasting Corporation, This Land, 1972 (John Lucky, producer)
