= Lakeshore Catholic High School =

- Port Colborne, Ontario; Canada

Information
- Type: Catholic
- Motto: Think Clearly, Feel Deeply, Act Wisely
- Established: 1988
- Principal: John Markovich
- Website: www.lakeshorecatholic.ca

Lakeshore Catholic High School is a high school located in Port Colborne, just north of the eastern edge of Lake Erie, in Ontario, Canada. It is part of the Niagara Catholic District School Board, and competes with students from communities in Fort Erie, Wainfleet, Dunnville, Dain city, and Port Colborne. The city is also serviced by a community based public high school, Port Colborne High School.

Lakeshore is home to over 750 students from across southern Niagara, stretching from Fort Erie to Dunnville. Lakeshore Catholic is known for its competitive athletics department that competes in Level 1 play. The Gator football team currently plays in Zone 1 Premier League for Zone 3, SOSSA and OFSAA. Gator football has made three previous trips to both Ivor Wynn Stadium and SkyDome (Rogers Centre) to play for one of the five provincial championship bowl games, winning in 2004 for southern Ontario and placing second in southern Ontario 2006 for an overall tie for fifth place. They have gone back to back in 2008 winning again and in 2009 and 2010 they were defeated by Notre Dame of Burlington. It is also the home of a music/arts department.

The school was founded in 1988 by Principal Pat Hudak to support the growing population of Catholic students in the area. Since then, the school has expanded twice, with another addition and multiple renovations currently on the books.

The school has been home to current NCDSB Director of Education John Crocco. Subsequent to the election, Mike Lostracco was transferred and became principal of St. Paul Catholic in Niagara Falls. The current principal of Lakeshore Catholic is John Markovich.

== Business partnerships ==
Lakeshore has a partnership with Cisco systems in the Cisco Systems Canada Networking Academy. "Part of the Networking Academy content focuses on teaching students how to design, build and maintain computer networks through two certification driven programs (Cisco Certified Networking Associate CCNA, and the Cisco Certified Networking Professional CCNP)." Students acquire IT industry skills such as (IT Essentials I & II, Panduit Network Infrastructure Essentials, Fundamentals of UNIX, and Fundamentals of Java Programming) that will all link to Industry recognized certifications (A+, Server+, Linux+, Sun Certified Java Programmer, and Panduit Authorized Installer). Globally the Cisco Systems Canada Networking Academy has more than 10,000 Academies in over 150 countries and with more than 1.5 million students enrolled.

== Dress and deportment ==
Students at the school are required to wear uniform, which should conform to school-defined guidelines, including style and colour. Infractions result in disciplinary action. These guidelines are set forth by school administrators.

== Sports ==
- The Sr Football Team has gone to OFSAA 3 straight years from 2008-2010 for the OFSAA Golden Horseshoe Bowl, playing the Notre Dame Fighting Irish (Burlington) in each of those games. In 2008 Lakeshore captured their 2nd OFSAA Championship, winning 8–7, however, they lost in 2009 and 2010 by scores of 33-10 and 16-14 respectively. OFSAA officials have called it the most exciting rivalry in OFSAA Football history.
- The Sr Football Team are constantly ranked in the Top 10 High School Football Teams in Canada (CFC FOOTBALL).
- Lakeshore Catholic's Jr Football Team has been Zone Champion's for 2 yrs straight and only losing one regular season game in the past 6 yrs.
- Lakeshore Catholic's Senior boy's Varsity hockey team are the Zone and SOSSA Champions.
- Lakeshore Catholic's Boys and Girls Varsity Golf teams are the current Zone Champions.
- Lakeshore Catholic's Sr. Football team won the OFSAA provincial championship in 2012, playing at the Rogers Centre.
- Lakeshore Catholic's Girl's Varsity Rugby team won Zone Championships in 2015 and 2016, making it on to OFSAA both years.

== Notable alumni ==
- Derek Schiavone, CFL player
- Nick Weglarz, Minor League Baseball player
- Tony Dekker, Canadian Musician
- Matty Matheson, Canadian chef and internet personality

== See also ==
- Education in Ontario
- List of secondary schools in Ontario
- Port Colborne High School
- École secondaire catholique Garneau

== References and notes ==
1. "Secondary Schools boundary map". Niagara Catholic District School Board. Archived from the original on 2006-05-13.
2. "Cisco Networking Academy Program: Participating Educational institutions in Ontario". Archived from the original on 2006-03-23.
3. "Cisco Systems College Program". Archived from the original on 2006-04-22.
4. "Top Ten High School Teams in Canada 2004". nflcflfutures.com.
5. Lakeshore Senior Football, accessed April 4, 2006
