= Bishop Reding Catholic Secondary School =

Bishop P.F. Reding Catholic Secondary School
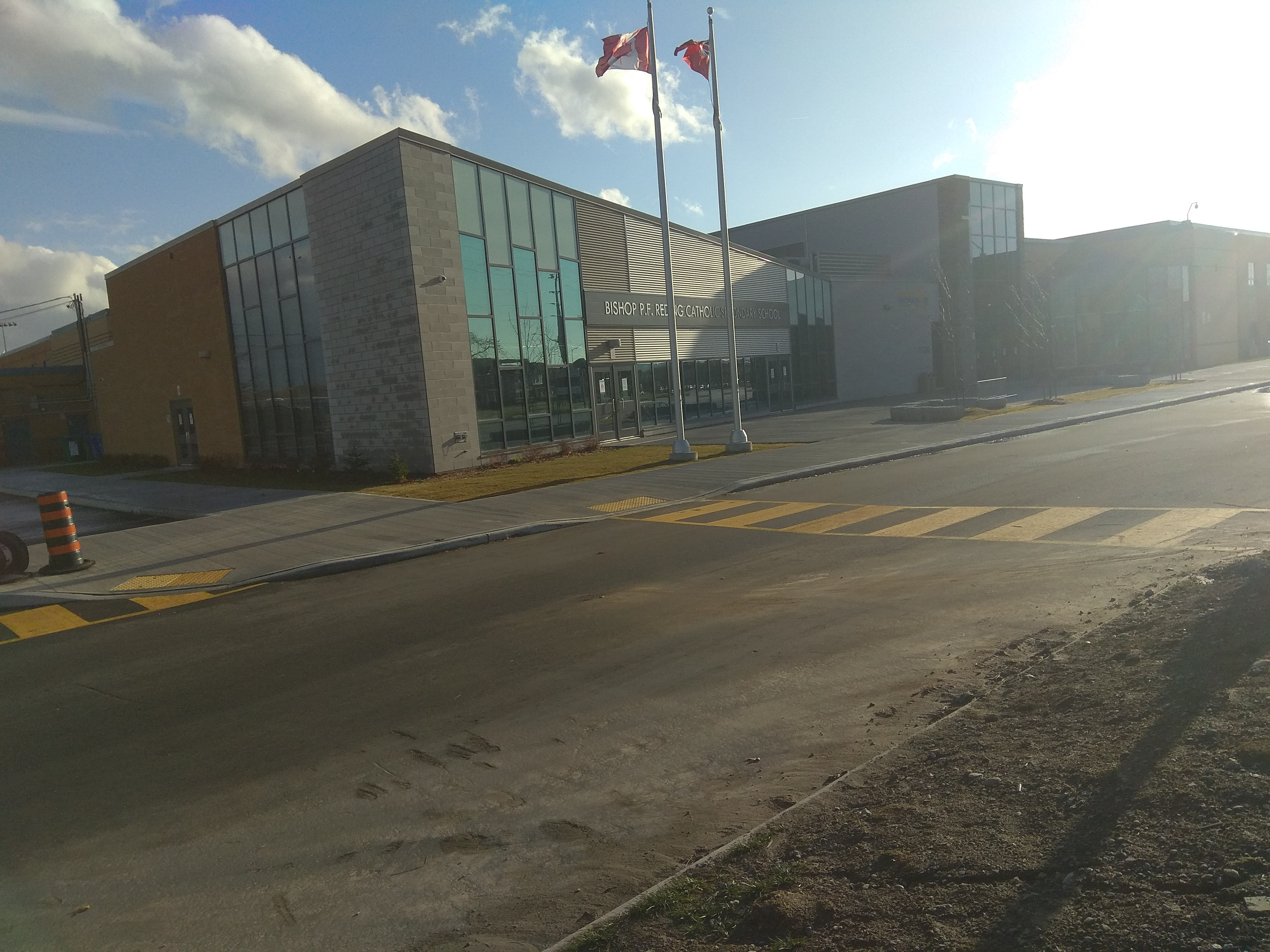

Location
- 1120 Main Street East; Milton, Ontario, L9T 6H7; Canada; 43°31′50″N 79°51′45″W

Information
- Former name: Bishop Paul F. Reding Roman Catholic Secondary School
- School type: Public, Roman Catholic Secondary School
- Motto: Together in His Name
- Religious affiliation: Catholic
- Founded: 1986
- School board: Halton Catholic District School Board
- Superintendent: Michael Skrzypek
- School number: 689726
- Principal: Chris Chliszczyk
- Chaplain: Marie O'Connell
- Grades: 9 - 12
- Language: English
- Student Union/Association: Bishop Reding Student Council
- Colours: Red and black
- Mascot: Roary the Lion
- Team name: Reding Royals
- Website: werbr.ca

Bishop Paul Francis Reding Secondary School is a coeducational Catholic Secondary School in Milton, Ontario, Canada. The school offers grades nine through twelve and is run by the Halton Catholic District School Board.

== History ==
Bishop Reding was founded in 1986. Its namesake is Bishop Paul Francis Reding, Bishop of the Hamilton Diocese for ten years and an ardent defender of Catholic education. The school was the first Catholic high school for Northern Halton. In 1994, the school participated in a 25-year HCDSB time capsule project, opened in 2019. In 2002, many of Bishop Reding's students were transferred to the new school in Halton Hills, Christ the King Catholic Secondary School, a change commemorated with a plaque in the BR Trophy Case.

Similarly, in 2013, many BR students were redistricted due to a population swell in Milton, to St. Francis Xavier Catholic Secondary School. Milton MPP and Wynne Government Education Minister, Indira Naidoo-Harris, announced an $18 million extension to BR that would cut the number of portable classrooms down from 43 to 27, by the 2020–2021 school year. After it was temporarily cancelled by the Ford Government, Milton MPP Parm Gill announced that funding would be reallocated for the Bishop Reding expansion.

Bishop Reding has been noted for their student involvement, holding walkouts protesting both the controversial HCDSB Sanctity of Life motion, organized by student leaders Karyssa Chan, Margaret Manangan, and Ashwini Selvakumaran, and the Ford Government's cuts to education and OSAP.

== Athletics ==
The school's athletics programs include:

- Badminton
- Baseball
- Basketball
- Cross country running
- Curling - 2016, 2019 HCAA Champions
- Rugby
- Football
- Hockey
- Ping pong
- Softball
- Soccer – 2004, 2009 ( GIRLS ), 2022 OFSAA Champions
- Swimming
- Ultimate Frisbee – 2008 OFSAA Spirit Champions and 2019 HCAA Champions
- Volleyball
- Track and field

== Extracurriculars ==
=== BR DECA/Business Club ===
DECA at Bishop Reding has reached the provincial level. In 2019 five students qualified for the DECA International Conference (ICDC) in Orlando, Florida, these five being the only five from the entire Halton Catholic District School Board to attend. BR DECA goes hand-in-hand with the Business Club, founded in 2019 which raises funds and arranges sales, primarily to run the BR's Got Talent talent show.

=== Model UN ===
The BR Model UN club participates in the Southern Ontario Model UN Assembly, hosted at the University of Toronto.

=== BR STEM Team ===
The BR Stem Team works to further studies of sciences, technology, engineering, and math at Bishop Reding and the feeder schools. In 2016, the Team hosted their first student-run conference.

=== Reach for the Top ===
Bishop Reding's Reach Team has operated for over 15 years. In 2018-2019 year the Senior team qualified for the Reach Provincial Competition. The official mascot of the team is James Bui, a fictional anime construct of an ideal reach competitor.

== Notable alumni ==
- Shawn Hill, MLB pitcher.
- Matt O'Meara, CFL Offensive Lineman.
- Joey Melo, MLS soccer player.
- Kwaku Boateng, CFL Defensive Lineman.
- Ben Preisner, Olympic marathoner.
- Alysa King, actress.
- Matt Sewell, CFL Offensive Lineman.

== See also ==
- Education in Ontario
- List of secondary schools in Ontario
