= Halton Catholic District School Board =

School board in Ontario, Canada

Halton Catholic District School Board (HCDSB)
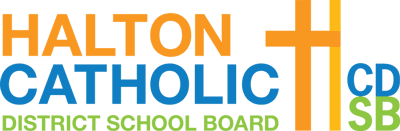

Location
- 802 Drury Lane, Burlington, Ontario, Canada Milton, Ontario; Oakville, Ontario; Burlington, Ontario; Georgetown, Ontario Canada
- Coordinates: 43.3417°N 79.8029°W (Board office)

District information
- Chair of the board: Marvin Duarte
- Director of education: John Klein
- Schools: 48 Elementary; 10 Secondary; 3 Adult Learning Centres
- Budget: CA$533.9 million (September - August, 2025-2026)

Other information
- Website: www.hcdsb.org

The Halton Catholic District School Board (HCDSB) serves over 36,000 students at its 48 elementary schools, 10 secondary schools and 3 continuing education facilities. The HCDSB serves the communities of Burlington, Halton Hills, Milton, and Oakville, with the main Board office (Catholic Education Centre) located in Burlington, Ontario, Canada.

The Halton Catholic District School Board is the Catholic school board for the Halton region.

== History ==
The Halton Catholic District School Board traces its roots back to 1856 when the founder Robin Smith and Father Morgan Rex-Ryan founded St. Mary's School – the first Catholic elementary school in Oakville to establish education programs for Catholic children in the town of Oakville. A separate school zone was formally established in 1856, in which the Oakville Separate School Board was constituted. Under provincial legislation, separate school zones were later formed in Burlington, Georgetown and Milton.

As part of a province-wide restructuring of school boards initiated by then Minister of Education Bill Davis, Halton's separate school boards were merged to form the Halton County Roman Catholic Separate School Board, which came into effect on January 1, 1969. As a result of the formation of the Regional Municipality of Halton in 1974, it became the "Halton Roman Catholic Separate School Board", and its jurisdiction was extended to the entire Region.

In the years following amalgamation, the Board witnessed, not only the physical growth of its English language schools, but also the development of French language schools, and the eventual establishment of a French Language Section of the Board to govern the three French-language schools in 1986.

In the late 1970s, the school board ventured into the area of secondary education, and, assisted by the legislative provision for full funding to Ontario's Catholic secondary schools in 1986, established five secondary schools, later adding four more:

Initially	Later schools
Assumption Secondary (1977); St. Ignatius of Loyola Secondary (1982); Bishop P. F. Reding Secondary (1986); Notre Dame Secondary (1989); St. Thomas Aquinas Secondary (1990)	Christ the King Secondary (2002); Holy Trinity Secondary (2002); Corpus Christi Secondary (2008); St. Francis Xavier Secondary (2013); St Kateri Tekakwitha Secondary (2021)

Amalgamation also opened the school system to special needs students, and as a result the Special Education Department was created. This occurred in advance of provincial legislation passed in 1980 on the matter.

In 1986, the new department of Continuing Education Services was created, which first operated out of a portable classroom at the Board's Drury Lane Catholic Education Centre.

Over the same years, the Board dealt with unprecedented growth—particularly in the southern half of Halton Region—culminating in increased demands on the education system and numerous changes in the education field itself.

As part of the province-wide restructuring of Ontario's school boards as a consequence of the passage of the Fewer School Boards Act, 1997, the Board's schools were transferred to the following new bodies:

- the English-language Separate District School Board No. 46 (which was merged with the former Board at the beginning of 1998), and
- the French-language Separate District School Board No. 64 (which later became the Conseil scolaire de district catholique Centre-Sud).

The English-language Separate District School Board No. 46 was renamed as the "Halton Catholic District School Board" in 1999.

== About the board ==
The Halton Catholic District School Board provides educational services to over 37,000 students of all ages, in 46 elementary schools, 9 high schools, and three continuing education facilities.

=== Board of trustees ===
Name of Trustee	Region	Wards	Source
Chair: Marvin Duarte	Milton	1 and 4	
Vice Chair: Brenda Agnew	Burlington	4 and 5	
Kirsten Kelly	Burlington	1 and 2	
Trish Powell	Burlington	3 and 6	
Janet O’Hearn-Czarnota	Halton Hills	N/A	
Emma Murphy	Milton	2 and 3	
Robert Kennedy	Oakville	1, 2 and 3	
Chris Saunders	Oakville	4 and 7	
Helena Karabela	Oakville	5 and 6	

The HCDSB Board of Trustees consists of nine elected Trustees, which are elected every four years during the municipal election. There are three trustees representing Burlington, one representing Halton Hills, two representing Milton, and three representing Oakville, respectively.

=== Student Trustees ===
As required by the Ontario Ministry of Education, the HCDSB keeps three student trustees. The student trustees are elected every year by the student senate. There are three student trustees, one for Oakville, one for Burlington, and one to represent the entirety of North Halton (Milton, Georgetown, Acton, Halton Hills). Student trustees attend all regular board meetings, although their vote is non-binding. They are allowed to voice their opinions on issues important to students in the board. The following students have been elected to serve on the Board.

Student trustees at the HCDSB, by term
Term	Trustees
2025-2026	Ropier Hanna (Holy Trinity CSS, Oakville) Maia-Sofia Adeleye (Christ the King CSS, Georgetown) Valini Parasram (Assumption CSS, Burlington)
2023-2024	Lauren McGuire (St. Ignatius Loyola, Oakville) Arianna Chua (St. Francis Xavier, Milton) Diya Deepu (Assumption CSS, Burlington)
2022-2023	Katie Bowie (St. Ignatius Loyola, Oakville) Arianna Chua (St. Francis Xavier, Milton) Brady Kuzma (Corpus Christi CSS, Burlington)
2021-2022	Katie Bowie (St. Ignatius Loyola, Oakville) Alicia Tokiwa (Christ the King, Georgetown) Gabriela Masri Ahmar (Corpus Christi CSS, Burlington)
2020-2021	Joseph Roshdy (St. Ignatius Loyola, Oakville) Nicholas Gubert (Christ the King, Georgetown) Kirsten Kelly (Assumption CSS, Burlington)
2019-2020	Malika Bhambra (St. Thomas Aquinas, Oakville) Davin Caratao (Bishop Reding CSS, Milton) Dylex Suan (Corpus Christi CSS, Burlington)
2018-2019	William Charlebois (Holy Trinity CSS, Oakville) Denzel Herrero (Jean Vanier CSS, Milton) Stephanie Mazza (Assumption CSS, Burlington)
2017-2018	Christina Atrach (Christ the King CSS, Halton Hills) Anamaria Barbul (Holy Trinity CSS, Oakville) Ingrid Schwecht (Assumption CSS, Burlington)
2016-2017	Christina Atrach (Christ the King CSS, Halton Hills) Ingrid Schwecht (Assumption CSS, Burlington) Manuela Zapata (St. Thomas Aquinas, Oakville)
2015-2016	Jackson Brown (Corpus Christi CSS, Burlington) Chloe Kemeni (Bishop Reding CSS, Milton) Manuela Zapata (St. Thomas Aquinas, Oakville)
2014-2015	Jason Barron (Notre Dame CSS, Burlington) Chloe Kemeni (Bishop Reding CSS, Milton) Joel Louzado (St. Ignatius Loyola, Oakville)
2013-2014	Jason Barron (Notre Dame CSS, Burlington) Erika Shepherd (Christ the King CSS, Halton Hills) Maria Thomas (St. Thomas Aquinas, Oakville
2012-2013	Jarrod Baddeliyanage (St. Ignatius Loyola, Oakville) Noah Parker (Notre Dame CSS, Burlington) Emily Wilson (Christ the King CSS, Halton Hills)
2011-2012	Emily Bradley (Bishop Reding CSS, Milton) Emma Harper (Corpus Christi CSS, Burlington) Clarisse Schneider (St. Ignatius Loyola, Oakville)
2010-2011	Christiane Peric (Christ the King CSS, Halton Hills) Clarisse Schneider (St. Ignatius Loyola, Oakville)
2009-2010	Briar Culbert (Notre Dame CSS, Burlington) Chelsea Gray (St. Thomas Aquinas CSS, Oakville) Steven Slowka (Christ the King CSS, Halton Hills)
2008-2009	Neil Bourque (Notre Dame CSS, Burlington) Philip Cockburn (Christ the King CSS, Halton Hills) Chloé Restivo (Holy Trinity CSS, Oakville)
2007-2008	Erin Gamble (Holy Trinity CSS, Oakville) Teanna Lobo (Notre Dame CSS, Burlington) Kelly Medeiros (Bishop Reding CSS, Milton)
2006-2007	Ryan Durran (Burlington) Heather MacKinnon (North Halton) Jaclyn Peluso (Oakville)
2005-2006	Anthony Luna (North Halton) Amy O'Brien (Burlington) Lindsay Robertson (Oakville)

=== Student Senate ===
The Student Senate is a committee of approximately 80 members (3-8 from each secondary school) designed as an advisory body to the Student Trustees, which in turn relay their concerns or recommendations to regular Board Meetings. Student Senators are picked yearly, through an application process. All students are eligible to apply, with the exception of ninth graders as the application process ends the year before.

== Schools ==
=== Continuing Education ===
- Thomas Merton Centre for Continuing Education (Burlington)
- Thomas Merton Centre for Continuing Education (Milton)
- Thomas Merton Centre for Continuing Education (Oakville)

=== Families of Schools ===
City	Secondary School	Associate Elementary Schools
Burlington	Assumption CSS	Ascension Catholic Elementary School; Holy Rosary Catholic Elementary School; St. John Catholic Elementary School; St. Patrick Catholic Elementary School; St. Paul Catholic Elementary School; St. Raphael Catholic Elementary School
Burlington	Corpus Christi CSS	*Sacred Heart of Jesus Catholic Elementary School: St. Anne Catholic Elementary School; St. Christopher Catholic Elementary School; St. Elizabeth Seton Catholic Elementary School
Burlington	Notre Dame CSS	Canadian Martyrs Catholic Elementary School; St. Gabriel Catholic Elementary School; St. Mark Catholic Elementary School; St. Timothy Catholic Elementary School
Oakville	Holy Trinity CSS	Our Lady of Peace Catholic Elementary School; St. Andrew Catholic Elementary School; St. John Catholic Elementary School; St. Marguerite D'Youville Catholic Elementary School; St. Michael Catholic Elementary School
Oakville	St. Ignatius of Loyola CSS	St. Teresa of Calcutta Catholic Elementary School; St. Bernadette Catholic Elementary School; St. Gregory the Great Catholic Elementary School; St. Joan of Arc Catholic Elementary School; St. John Paul II Catholic Elementary School; St. Matthew Catholic Elementary School
Oakville	St. Thomas Aquinas CSS	Holy Family Catholic Elementary School; St. Dominic Catholic Elementary School; St. Nicholas Catholic Elementary School; St. Luke Catholic Elementary School; St. Mary Catholic Elementary School; St. Vincent Catholic Elementary School
Milton	Bishop P.F. Reding CSS	Holy Rosary Catholic Elementary School; Our Lady of Victory Catholic Elementary School; St. Anthony of Padua Catholic Elementary School; St. Peter Catholic Elementary School
Milton	St. Francis Xavier CSS	Lumen Christi Catholic Elementary School; Queen of Heaven Catholic Elementary School; St. Benedict Catholic Elementary School; St. Josephine Bakhita Catholic Elementary School; St. Scholastica Catholic Elementary School
Milton	St. Kateri Tekakwitha CSS	Guardian Angels Catholic Elementary School; Our Lady of Fatima Catholic Elementary School; St. Veronica Catholic Elementary School
Halton Hills	Christ the King CSS	Holy Cross Catholic Elementary School; St. Brigid Catholic Elementary School; St. Catherine of Alexandria Catholic Elementary School; St. Francis of Assisi Catholic Elementary School; St. Joseph (Acton) Catholic Elementary School

== See also ==
- Halton District School Board
- List of school districts in Ontario
- List of high schools in Ontario
