= Nick Weglarz =

Canadian baseball player

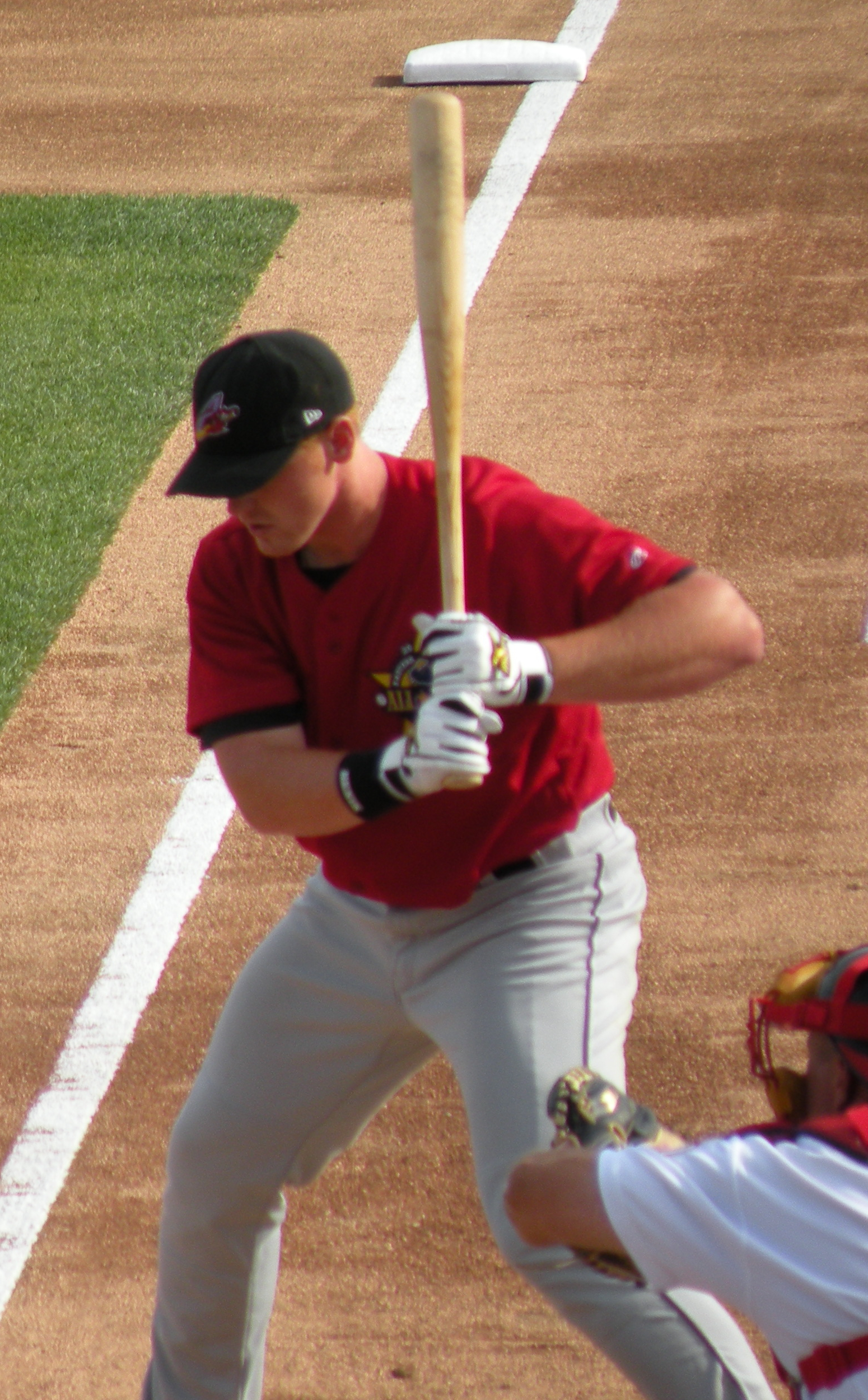
- Weglarz participating in the Eastern League Home Run Derby in 2009
- Outfielder
- Born: December 16, 1987 (age 38); Stevensville, Ontario, Canada
- Bats: Left Throws: Left
- Stats at Baseball Reference

Nicholas E. Weglarz (born December 16, 1987) is a Canadian former professional baseball outfielder.

== Career ==
He attended Lakeshore Catholic High School in Port Colborne, Ontario. Weglarz was selected in the 2005 Major League Baseball draft in the third round (94th overall pick) as a first baseman by the Indians, and signed by Indians scout Les Pajari. Weglarz played mostly in the outfield for the Indians' affiliate the Burlington Indians.

Weglarz was also a part of Team Canada's baseball team in the 2008 Olympics in Beijing, where he hit .400 in the preliminaries, and .450 in the Olympic qualifier against Taiwan. He now plays senior men's baseball in the NDBA where he led the Ft Erie Cannons to a senior men's B league championship. Now an employee at Peter’s excavating
