= St. Thomas Aquinas Catholic Secondary School (Oakville) =

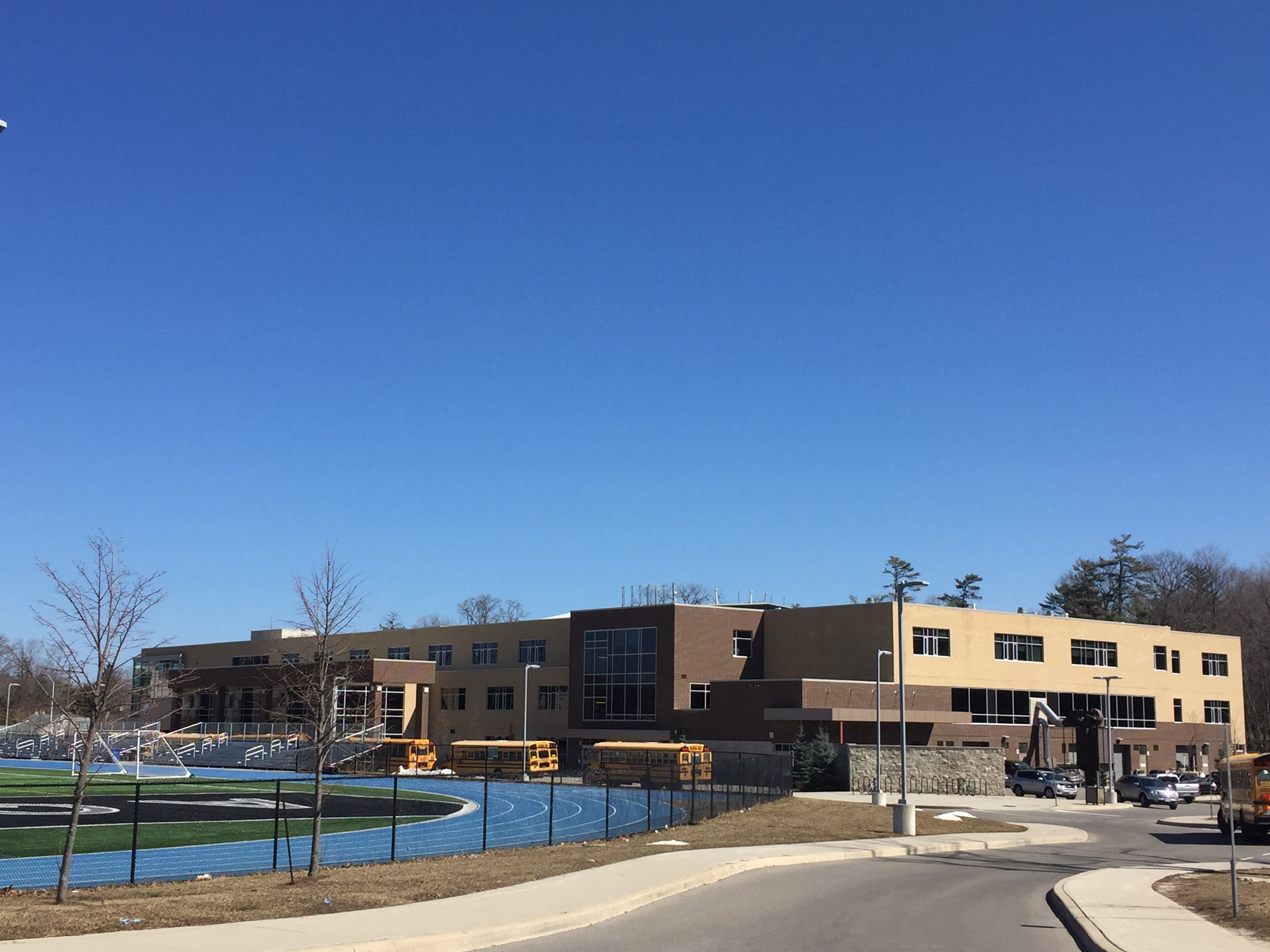

Location
- 124 Dorval Drive; Oakville, Ontario, ON L6K 2W1; Canada; 43.4351°N 79.6806°W

Information
- School type: Separate Secondary School
- Motto: "aequalitas, veritas, excellentia" ("equality, truth, excellence")
- Religious affiliation: Roman Catholic
- Founded: 1990
- School board: Halton Catholic District School Board
- Superintendent: Emi Bakaic
- Area trustee: Robert Kennedy
- Principal: Kathleen Moro
- Grades: 9 to 12
- Enrolment: c. 1200 (September 2016)
- Language: English, with language classes in French and Italian
- Area: Halton
- Colours: black, white and grey
- Mascot: Raider Tom
- Nickname: STA
- Team name: Aquinas Raiders
- Newspaper: aquinas.me
- Website: sta.hcdsb.org

St. Thomas Aquinas Catholic Secondary School is a high school located in the western part of Old Oakville in Oakville, Ontario. St. Thomas Aquinas is a member of the Halton Catholic District School Board. There are over 1100 students attending the school in grades 9 through 12.

At St. Thomas Aquinas, the current principal is Ms. Kathleen Moro and the vice-principals are Mr. David Agro and Ms. Melissa Giardina (for the IB Programme) as of November 2024.

The school offers an International Baccalaureate program as well as academic programs for university-bound students, applied programs for college-bound students, and essential/workplace programs for students transitioning from high school directly to the workplace; it also offers co-op programs for workplace experience. The school community prides itself on athletic achievements, and STA fields teams known as the "Raiders" in a wide variety of sports (see below). Arts-related groups include the Aquinas Concert Band (which won a bronze medal at the Atlantic Band Festival in Halifax in May 2006), a Jazz Band, a choir, two yearly school plays, and the school's Light and Sound Crew. Several leadership and school community groups also exist, including the school's Student Council, the STA Model United Nations Organization, the Athletic Council, Art's Council, Mentors and the Social Justice Club.

The St. Thomas Aquinas family of schools includes the following elementary schools: St. Dominic Catholic Elementary School, St. Nicholas Catholic Elementary School, St. Vincent Catholic Elementary School, and St. Luke Catholic Elementary schools.

== Old school building ==
The first St. Thomas Aquinas school building was built in the 1960s, when it was first opened as Gordon E. Perdue High School. In 1990, the school became a Catholic high school when it was transferred from the public board to the Catholic board for the sum of $1 (as some money was required, by law, to be exchanged).

The original school building was composed of five floors: three in the south end of the building and two in the north. The floors were offset by about 1/2 of a storey at a point just north of the school's main lobby. In the southern three-storey portion of the school were classrooms for the languages, mathematics, business and social studies departments, in addition to key school facilities such as the main office, the school's chapel and the library. In the northern two-storey portion of the school were the gymnasium, cafeteria, staff room and classrooms for the science, fine arts and technical studies departments.

St. Thomas Aquinas also had a number of portables in the late 1990s, which were later removed as the school's population declined due to the removal of the OAC grade and the opening of Holy Trinity Catholic Secondary School in north Oakville.

== Plans For School Reconstruction ==
Despite a series of renovations over its lifetime, much of the school building dated back to the opening of the original Gordon E. Perdue High School more than forty years ago. Due to some poor construction (as well as poor planning), problems and inconveniences cropped up as the building began to show its age, resulting in growing support among the school community for a new, more modern school building.

In mid-May 2007, the Oakville Beaver reported that the Halton Catholic District School Board had made it a priority to provide funding for and move forward with the replacement of the school building. A major step forward came when the government of Ontario announced a $15 million grant in early September to go towards the replacement of the school building.

However, requiring a further $18 million for the project, the Halton Catholic District School Board began to look into other options to continue to raise money, in particular a plan that would have students diverted from St. Ignatius of Loyola and Holy Trinity Catholic Secondary schools to St. Thomas Aquinas in order to qualify for provincial grants. The proposed redirection of elementary school graduates from northern Oakville drew protest from parents who either opposed more boundary reviews or wanted their children to attend high school closer to home.

The proposed site plan was also altered and rearranged after the renovation project, as well as the planned lighting for the new sports field, drew resistance from residents in the surrounding area of south Oakville. The Southwest Central Oakville Residents Association (SCORA) was formed in 2008 to protest the school board's "disregard" for the natural setting, the elimination of grass sports fields, the addition of asphalt parking lots, the removal of "hundreds" of trees from the location, and the plans for "mega-lights" on the sports field. SCORA maintained that these factors would negatively impact both the character and property values of the surrounding neighbourhoods.

During the 2008-2009 school year, 24 portables were installed in the area formerly occupied by the school's sports field. By the late spring of 2009, students, faculty and staff had vacated the south end of the school, and a temporary main office had been set up in a vacated classroom at the school's north end. By May 2009, construction crews had finished stripping down the interior of the three floors (100s, 200s, and 300s) in the south end of the school, in addition to the main lobby and the school library. By June 2009, the portion of the school south of its main gymnasium had been demolished, though construction of the new building had not yet begun. Until the new building opened in February 2011, students continued to use the remaining northern half of the building, as well as the portables, to begin the 2009-2010 school year. During the transition, the school's many functions, such as the yearly school play, and so forth, continued to run. No extra-curricular activities were cancelled during this time.

== New school building ==
The new St. Thomas Aquinas school building opened in February 2011, coinciding with the start of the second semester of the 2010-2011 school year.

The new school building has three levels and features a theatre, two gymnasiums, a full range of tech and co-op classrooms and an interior running track.

== Notable alumni ==
- Ivan Chiriaev – former NBA prospect
- Carl English – professional basketball player, who attended the school for one year prior to attending the University of Hawaii
- Kara Lang – former player on the Canadian Women's National Soccer Team, youngest to be named to the team (at age 15)
- Tabitha Lupien – actress and competitive dancer
- Brooke Schmidt – bronze medalist with Canada women's national curling team at the 2018 Winter Olympic Games
- John Tavares – current forward for the Toronto Maple Leafs of the NHL, gold medalist with Team Canada at Sochi 2014
- Luke Evangelista – current forward for the Nashville Predators of the NHL
- Nick Mardner – current wide receiver for the Ottawa Redblacks of the CFL, former NCAA Division I collegiate men's football at University of Hawaii, University of Cincinnati, and Auburn University

== Academics ==
St. Thomas Aquinas offers academic programs oriented toward university, college, and workplace destinations. The school is the only Catholic school in Oakville that offers IB (International Baccalaureate), a "non-profit" educational foundation offering four highly respected programmes of international education that develop the intellectual, personal, emotional and social skills needed to live, learn and work in a rapidly globalizing world. The school also offers programs for special-needs students under the Special Education department.

=== Regional programs ===
St. Thomas Aquinas is the host school for several regional programs for both the Halton Catholic and Halton Public school boards. These programs are available to all students in either board providing they meet any applicable prerequisites. These programs are Specialist High Skills Major (SHSM) programs.

- Computer Information and Communications Technology (ICT) SHSM - A program that enables students to build a foundation of sector-focused knowledge and skills before graduating and entering apprenticeship training, college, university, or an entry-level position in the workplace.
- Health and Wellness Specialist High Skills Major - designed to help students make a smooth transition into health-care related careers, which offer many opportunities due to aging demographics. The curriculum delivered in this program focuses on human physiology and anatomy, pathology, immunology, basic medical terminology, gerontology, child development and laboratory practical elements.
- Sports Specialist High Skills Major - teaching students skills in running sports and physical events (new as of 2021)

=== Accessibility ===
STA consists of 5 different entrances, from all different sides of the buildings, along with many emergency exits. Inside the school, there are 4 different stairwells, providing easy access to all three levels ensuring that students and staff can get to where they need to go quickly and easily. There is also an elevator located in front of the Attendance Office which also has access to all three stories. NOTE: Students are not permitted to use the elevator without explicit permission from a staff member.

=== Extracurriculars ===
St. Thomas Aquinas offers a variety of extra-curricular clubs and activities including Raider Media, its media and information group.

- Art Club
- Athletic Council
- Breakfast Club
- Book Club
- Chess Club
- Concert Band
- CrossFit
- Dance Team
- DECA business club
- Development and Peace Club
- Disc Golf Team
- Diversity Club
- Eco Club
- Engineering Club
- French Club
- Fishing Club
- Games Club
- Graduation Committee
- HOSA
- Interact
- Mock Trial Team
- Model United Nations
- Physics Club
- Prefects
- Prism Action Committee
- Raider Media
  - Raider Weekly (and Raider Weekly Reels)
  - Raiders Unplugged
- Ram Mentors
- Rock & Roll Club
- Social Justice Council
- SOMA
- STArt Council
- Tennis Table Club
- Team Unbreakable (Running Club)
- Theatre Aquinas
- Weight Room Club
- Wood Shop Club

They also have a variety of clubs centered towards diversity and inclusion, such as the Asian Student Alliance, Black Student Union, Gay-Straight Alliance (also known as PAC), and the Muslim Student Association. STA also has Representation Matters for representation of all cultures.

== Athletics ==
St. Thomas Aquinas fields athletic teams called the "Raiders". STA is a member school of the Halton Secondary School Athletics Association. Students at St. Thomas can participate in both individual and team sports in any of three seasons: fall, winter, or spring.

=== Varsity teams ===
- Girls' Soccer: OFSAA Gold: 2006, OFSAA Silver: 2004, 2008 Halton 'A/AA' & GHAC Champions: 2004, 2006, 2007, 2008, 2010
- Boys' Soccer: HSSAA 'A/AA' League Champions: 2005, 2007, 2009, 2010. OFSAA Participants: 2005, 2007, 2009, 2010, 2011
- Boys' Football
- Girls' Basketball: HSSAA Tier 2 Champions: 2011, Halton Catholic League Champions: 2017
- Boys' Basketball: HSSAA Tier 2 Champions: 2011
- Boys' Golf
- Girls' Golf
- Girls' Field hockey
- Boys' Rugby
- Girls' Rugby
- Boys' Volleyball
- Girls' Volleyball
- Boys' Baseball
- Girls' Softball
- Boys' Lacrosse
- Cross country
- Track and field
- Boys' Hockey: 2009 OFSAA A/AA Bronze medalists
- Girls' Hockey
- Boys and girls' Swimming: 2012-2014 OFSAA qualifiers
- Ultimate Frisbee

=== Junior and midget teams ===
- Boys' Football: Junior Team (Division 2) Halton Champions: 2007
- Girls' Soccer
- Boys' Soccer
- Boys' Football: Halton Champions (Division 2): 1993, 2007
- Girls' Basketball: HSSAA Tier 2 Champions: 2011
- Boys' Basketball
- Girls' Field hockey
- Boys' Rugby
- Girls' Rugby
- Boys' Volleyball
- Girls' Volleyball
- Boys' Baseball
- Boys' Midget baseball
- Girls' Softball
- Boys' Lacrosse
- Cross country
- Track and field

== See also ==
- Education in Ontario
- List of secondary schools in Ontario
