= Helen Kinnear =

Canadian lawyer and judge (1894–1970)

Helen Kinnear QC
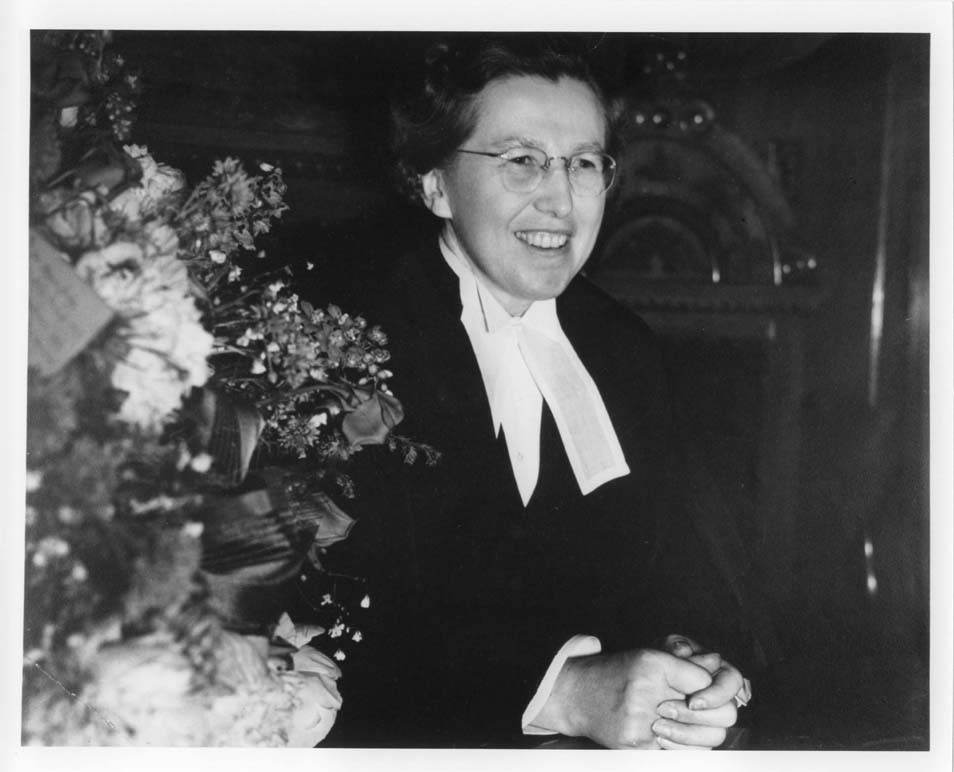
- Kinnear (ca. 1943)

Personal details
- Born: May 6, 1894 Cayuga, Ontario, Canada
- Died: April 25, 1970 (aged 75) Port Colborne, Ontario, Canada
- Citizenship: Canadian citizenship
- Education: Osgoode Hall Law School

Helen Alice Kinnear, QC (May 6, 1894 – April 25, 1970) was a Canadian lawyer and judge. She was the first woman in the British Commonwealth to be made a King's Counsel, the first female lawyer to argue before the Supreme Court of Canada, and the first woman appointed as a judge by the Government of Canada.

== Early life ==
Kinnear was born in Cayuga, Ontario, Canada. Her father, Louis Kinnear, was well-known lawyer who practiced in Port Colborne and Welland County. She graduated from the University of Toronto. Afterward she attended Osgoode Hall Law School and was called to the Ontario bar, to become a lawyer, in 1920.

== Career ==
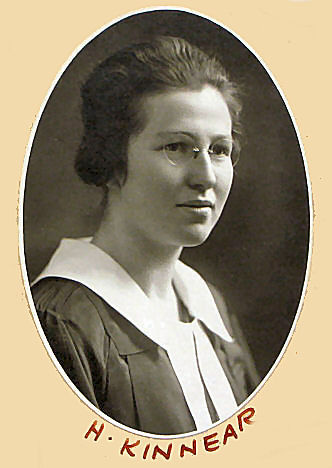
Graduation photo from the Law Society of Upper Canada in 1920

Kinnear practised law in Port Colborne, Ontario, where she initially practised with her father, who renamed the firm Kinnear & Kinnear. When her father died in 1924, she opened her own practice.

In 1934, she became the first woman in the British Commonwealth to be created a King's Counsel. In 1935, she became the first female lawyer in Canada to appear before the Supreme Court of Canada.

=== Politics ===
Kinnear was an active member of the Liberal Party of Canada. She was active in overcoming women's inequality in society and in the Liberal party. In 1941, after two previous failed attempts, Kinnear was made the Liberal party's nominee for the Welland Riding. It appeared that she would soon win election to Parliament of Canada. However, she later relinquished the role to Humphrey Mitchell, the newly appointed Minister of Labour who did not have a seat. Kinnear never ran again.

=== Judge ===
In 1943, Kinnear was appointed county court judge for Haldimand County, becoming the first woman in Canadian history to be appointed a judge by the federal government. Kinnear saw the appointment as not just a personal victory, but a victory for women. In 1947 she was appointed judge of the Juvenile Court. She was the first woman in the Commonwealth appointed to a county-court bench. When she attended a Commonwealth and Empire Law conference in 1955, she was noted as the "only woman in the Commonwealth to have been made a county court judge".

==== Royal Commissions ====
In 1954, Kinnear was appointed to two Royal Commissions: the Royal Commission for the Criminal Law Relating to Sexual Psychopaths and the Royal Commission Relating to the Defence of Insanity.

=== Retirement ===
Kinnear retired from her role as a judge in 1961 because of illness and moved back to Port Colborne. Kinnear, who had never married, lived with her sister Jennie. Kinnear died on April 25, 1970, in Port Colborne.

== Legacy ==
In 1965, Kinnear was awarded a medallion from the John Howard Society of Ontario for "Distinguished Humanitarian Service". The medallion was minted by INCO in her home town of Port Colborne.

In 1993 Canada Post issued a commemorative stamp to honour Kinnear's achievements.

=== Kinnear House ===
Kinnear House was Helen Kinnear's residence from 1904 to 1942. The house was built by lawyer Louis Kinnear in 1904.

In 1999, Kinnear House, situated at 232 Clarence Street, Port Colborne, was added to the database of Heritage Port Colborne's Local Architectural Conservation Advisory Committee for the purpose of publicizing Kinnear's residence as a noteworthy local property.
