= Eric Cerantola =

Canadian baseball player (born 2000)

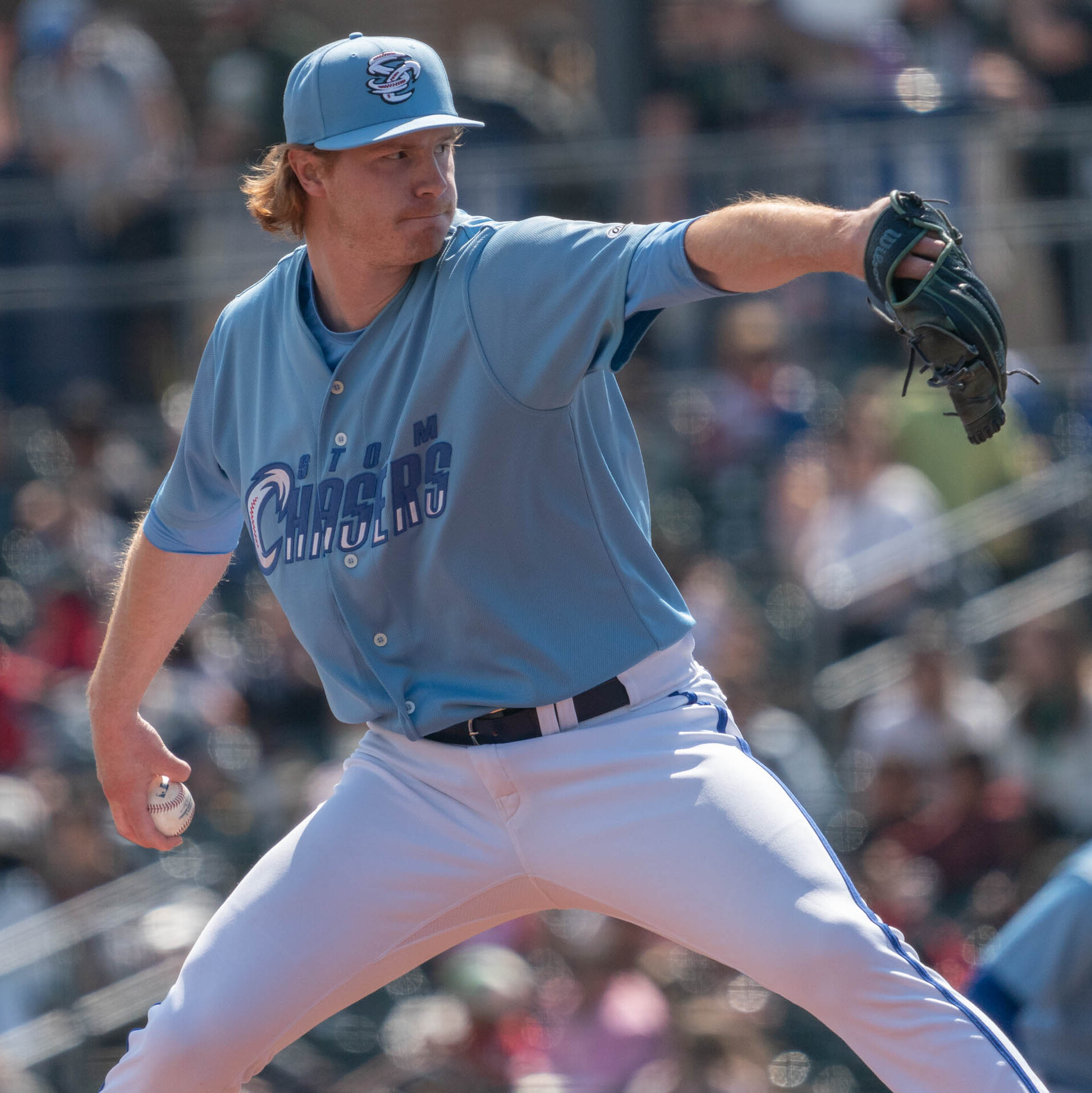
- Cerantola with the Omaha Storm Chasers in 2025

San Francisco Giants
- Pitcher
- Born: May 2, 2000 (age 26); Montreal, Quebec, Canada
- Bats: Right Throws: Right

MLB debut
- May 6, 2026, for the Kansas City Royals

MLB statistics (through 2026 season)
- Win–loss record: 0–0
- Earned run average: 10.13
- Strikeouts: 7
- Stats at Baseball Reference

Teams
- Kansas City Royals (2026)

Eric Cerantola (born May 2, 2000) is a Canadian professional baseball pitcher in the San Francisco Giants organization. He has previously played in Major League Baseball (MLB) for the Kansas City Royals.

== Career ==
Cerantola attended Holy Trinity Catholic Secondary School in Oakville, Ontario. The Owen Sound Attack of the Ontario Hockey League (OHL) selected him in the 2016 OHL draft, but he decided to focus on his baseball career. The Tampa Bay Rays of Major League Baseball (MLB) selected him in the MLB draft after he graduated from high school, but he enrolled at Mississippi State University to play college baseball for the Mississippi State Bulldogs instead, playing there for four seasons.

=== Kansas City Royals ===
The Kansas City Royals selected Cerantola in the fifth round, with the 139th overall selection, of the 2021 Major League Baseball draft. He signed with the Royals, receiving a $500,000 signing bonus, and made his professional debut with the rookie–level Arizona Complex League Royals, posting a 5.71 ERA with 24 strikeouts over 10 appearances.

Cerantola split the 2022 season between the Single–A Columbia Fireflies and High–A Quad Cities River Bandits. In 10 starts split between the two affiliates, he posted a 1–3 record and 5.34 ERA with 36 strikeouts across 30 1/3 innings pitched. Cerantola split 2023 between Quad Cities and the Double–A Northwest Arkansas Naturals, accumulating a 3–4 record and 3.66 ERA with 99 strikeouts and two saves across 76 1/3 innings pitched.

In 2024, Cerantola played for Double–A Northwest Arkansas and the Triple–A Omaha Storm Chasers. In 37 total appearances for the two affiliates, he compiled a 3–4 record and 2.97 ERA with 101 strikeouts across 72 2/3 innings pitched. Following the season, the Royals added Cerantola to their 40-man roster to protect him from the Rule 5 draft.

To begin the 2025 season, the Royals optioned Cerantola to Triple-A Omaha. He made 38 appearances (including one start) for Omaha, compiling a 2-2 record and 4.04 ERA with 63 strikeouts and one save over 49 innings of work. Cerantola was again optioned to Triple-A Omaha to begin the 2026 season.

On May 6, 2026, Cerantola was promoted to the major leagues for the first time. He made his MLB debut the same day, tossing a scoreless inning of relief against the Cleveland Guardians. Cerantola made four appearances for Kansas City, recording a 10.13 ERA with seven strikeouts across 5 1/3 innings pitched. On July 2, Cerantola was designated for assignment by the Royals.

=== San Francisco Giants ===
On July 6, 2026, Cerantola was claimed off of waivers by the San Francisco Giants. On July 15, Cerantola was removed from the 40–man roster and sent outright to the Triple-A Sacramento River Cats. In 20 games (1 start) with Triple-A Sacramento River Cats he threw 20.2 innings going 0-2 with a 3.92 ERA with 26 strikeouts and 6 saves.
