= Ivan Chiriaev =

Russian basketball player (born 1984)

Ivan Chiriaev (born August 25, 1984 in Saint Petersburg, Russian Soviet Federative Socialist Republic, USSR) is a former Russian basketball player.

== Amateur career ==
Chiriaev had a lot of hype surrounding him going into the 2004 NBA draft, but was not drafted. Chiriaev played high school basketball at St. Thomas Aquinas in Oakville, Ontario, Canada. He signed a letter-of-intent with Iowa State University in the US but did not attend.

== Pro career ==
Chiriaev was a bench player for Dynamo Moscow in the 2004–05 and 2005–06 seasons. He played the 2006–07 season for MyGuide Amsterdam.
