= St. Ignatius of Loyola Catholic Secondary School =

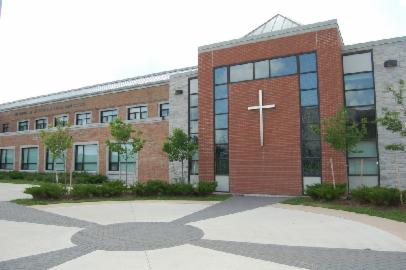

Location
- 1550 Nottinghill Gate; Oakville, Ontario, L6M 1S2; Canada; 43.44462°N 79.73359°W

Information
- School type: Separate secondary school
- Religious affiliation: Roman Catholic
- Founded: 1982
- School board: Halton Catholic District School Board
- Principal: Rocco Di Ianni
- Grades: 9-12
- Enrolment: 1300 (2023-2024)
- Language: English
- Area: Halton
- Colours: Navy blue, maroon
- Mascot: Hank the Hawk
- Team name: Loyola Hawks
- Website: loyola.hcdsb.org

St. Ignatius of Loyola Catholic Secondary School is a separate school in Oakville, Ontario. The school teaches curriculum based on the Catholic faith, and has close ties with the Diocese of Hamilton and the local church, St. Matthew's Parish.

As of the 2025-2026 school year, the principal is Rocco Di Ianni.

The St. Ignatius of Loyola family of schools includes the following Catholic elementary schools in Oakville: St. Bernadette, St. Gregory the Great Catholic, St. Joan of Arc, St. Mary, St. John Paul II, St. Matthew, and St. Teresa.

St. Ignatius of Loyola is Oakville’s first Catholic secondary school and the first secondary school in Ontario to be fully constructed using Ministry of Education capital grants.

== Notable alumni ==
- Anjulie, singer and songwriter
- Josh Janniere, professional soccer player
- Adam van Koeverden, gold medalist with the Canada men's national sprint canoe-kayak team at the 2004 Summer Olympics and MP for Milton, Ontario
- Kojo Aidoo, former fullback in the Canadian Football League

== See also ==
- Education in Ontario
- List of secondary schools in Ontario
