= Corpus Christi Catholic Secondary School =

Location
- 5150 Upper Middle Rd. Burlington, Ontario, L7L 0E5; Canada; 43.39778°N 79.7845°W

Information
- School type: secondary school
- Religious affiliation: Catholic
- Founded: 2008; 18 years ago
- School board: Halton Catholic District School Board
- Superintendent: Em Del Sordo
- Area trustee: Brenda Agnew
- Principal: Christopher Chliszczyk
- Grades: 9 to 12
- Enrolment: 1045
- Language: English
- Area: Halton/ Burlington
- Colours: Grey, white, burnt orange
- Mascot: Lonny the Longhorn
- Team name: Longhorns
- Website: www.cccss.ca

Corpus Christi Catholic Secondary School (also called "Corpus Christi" or simply "Corpus") is an educational Catholic secondary school in Burlington, Ontario, Canada.

The school name, in Latin, Corpus Christi, celebrates the Feast of the Body of Christ or the Eucharist. It remembers and honours the institution of Sacrament of Holy Communion at the Last Supper, and is celebrated on the Sunday following Trinity Sunday.

== Athletics ==
Sports teams at the school include:

- Alpine skiing
- Badminton
- Baseball
- Basketball (Midget, Junior, Senior)
- Cross country
- Field hockey
- Football (Junior, Senior)
- Girls rugby
- Golf (Varsity)
- Hockey
- Lacrosse
- Soccer
- Tennis
- Track and field
- Volleyball

== Notable alumni ==
- Simisola Shittu (born 1999), British-born Canadian basketball player for Ironi Ness Ziona of the Israeli Basketball Premier League

== See also ==
- Education in Ontario
- List of secondary schools in Ontario
