= Assumption Catholic Secondary School =

Location
- 3230 Woodward Avenue; Burlington, Ontario, L7M 3X6; Canada; 43.34830°N 79.78355°W

Information
- School type: Separate High School
- Motto: ave maria ora pro nobis (Hail Mary, pray for us)
- Religious affiliation: Roman Catholic
- Founded: 1977 (moved to current location in 1981)
- School board: Halton Catholic District School Board
- Superintendent: Nancy Dinolpho
- Principal: Patrick Brophy
- Grades: 9 to 12
- Enrolment: 1100 (School Year 2026/2027)
- Language: English
- Colours: Navy Blue and White
- Mascot: Crusader
- Team name: Assumption Crusaders
- Website: www.gobluego.ca

Assumption Catholic Secondary School is a Catholic high school in Burlington, Ontario.

== Background ==
The school population for the 2015-2016 school year was approximately 870. Assumption receives most new students from local separate elementary schools, including Ascension, St. Raphael, St. Paul, St. Patrick, St. John, and Holy Rosary. Like most Ontario secondary schools, Assumption offers academic programs for university-bound students and applied programs for college-bound students; it also offers co-op apprenticeship and workplace programs. In addition to the standard course types, Assumption offers Advanced Placement level courses in English, French, Geography and History, Math, and Science. Assumption, like all publicly funded Catholic schools in Ontario, also accepts non-Catholics. The Catholic school's parishes are Holy Rosary, St. Raphael's, St. John's, and St. Patrick's which are a part of the Diocese of Hamilton, under Bishop Joseph Dabrowski.

== Athletics ==
Assumption varsity athletic teams compete in the Halton Secondary School Athletic Association (HSSAA) during regular league play and for regional championships as a member of the Golden Horseshoe Athletic Conference (GHAC). Through this regional competition the school vies for entry into the provincial high school championships administered by the Ontario Federation of School Athletic Associations. As of the 2015/16 season, Assumption fields 14 varsity girls and 14 varsity boys teams.

== Clubs ==
Assumption offers a variety of extracurricular activities in addition to sport; as of August 2016 the school website lists 19 clubs. Some clubs, like the School Reach and Mock Trial teams, compete with other schools at a regional, provincial, and national level, while others, like the dance team, focus on in-school demonstrations and performances.

=== Notable performances ===
In 2010 the Senior School Reach Team had an undefeated regular season going 15-0 and qualified for the Provincial Championships. The team also qualified for the American Nationals in Chicago after qualifying at a tournament after playing against some of the top teams in Ontario. The team finished as the provincial runner-up and qualified for the Nationals, becoming the first team from Halton to do so. The team's captain was named one of the four National Finals MVP's.

== Notable alumni ==
- Katherine Barrell, Canadian actress, producer, and director
- Danny Brannagan, CFL player for the Toronto Argonauts
- Ryan Bomben, CFL player for the Hamilton Tiger-Cats
- Jillian Barberie, TV personality
- Ashley Johnston, NWHL player for the Metropolitan Riveters
- Bruno Hortelano, Spanish sprinter and 2016 Olympian
- Matt Vonk, CFL player for the Montreal Alouettes
- Jordan Szwarz, NHL player for the Boston Bruins
- Patty Sullivan, Canadian television presenter and actress
- Tebey, Canadian country singer / songwriter

== See also ==
- Education in Ontario
- List of secondary schools in Ontario
