= Canal Days =

Marine heritage festival held in Ontario, Canada

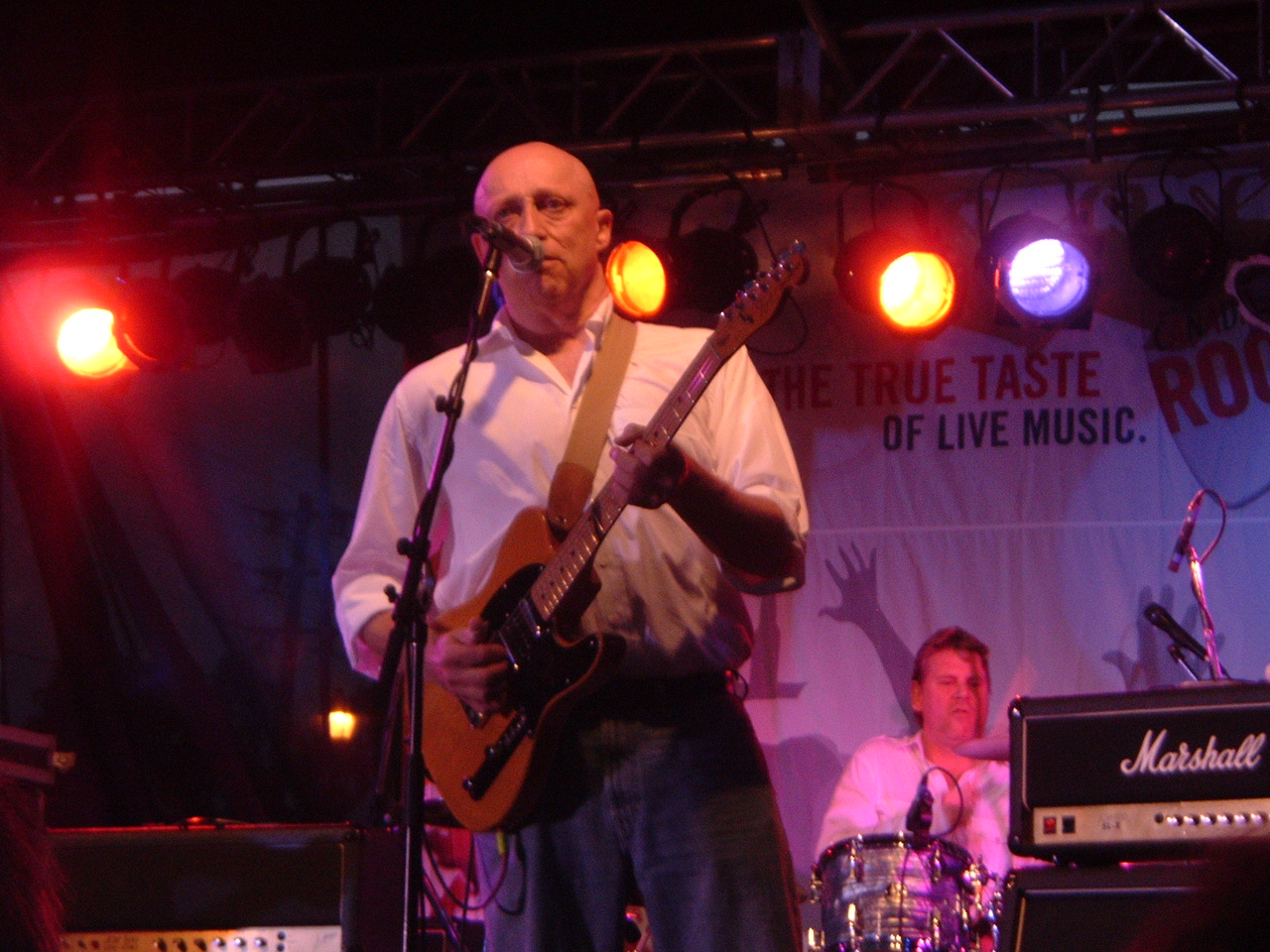
David Wilcox plays at Canal Days in August 2008.

Canal Days is a marine heritage festival held in Port Colborne, Ontario, Canada. The festival has been held annually since it was started in 1979 by the Port Colborne Historical & Marine Museum.

Port Colborne is located on the north-east shore of Lake Erie, on the southern portion of the Niagara Peninsula, and is about 30 minutes drive from the US border at Buffalo, New York. The city is also the southern terminus of the Welland Canal, where ocean vessels pass through the downtown area on their way into the inner Great Lakes, or out to sea.

Canal Days began in 1979 as part of a larger regional celebration of the 150th anniversary of the opening of the First Welland Canal. 400 visitors attended at the Museum grounds where the festival was held. In 1980 the Museum decided to continue with the festival, and it has grown larger each year since.

During Canal Days the downtown streets and lift-bridge are closed to traffic. The festival provides a supervised children's area with live entertainment, a carnival midway, and a live bird of prey and reptile exhibit. Tall Ships moored along the canal wall are open for exploration. The ships provide cruises including a day-long journey from Lake Ontario, through the canal locks.

The festival also hosts an open-air vending area and outdoor food court, and Ontario's largest outdoor vintage car show and kite display is located at H.H. Knoll park. The Roselawn Centre for the Living Arts hosts a Jazz on the Lawn concert with big band music; other performances include classic rock headliners, tribute bands, and local musicians.

The festival culminates with a boat parade along the Port Colborne canal corridor and a fireworks display over the water.

== Past Bands ==
Year	Band(s)
2001	The Northern Pikes
2006	Starship featuring Mickey Thomas
2007	Spirit of the West, David Wilcox, Sass Jordan
2008	Hedley, David Wilcox
2009	54-40, The Georgia Satellites, Ill Scarlett, Bachman Cummings (Randy Bachman & Burton Cummings), Steve Strongman, Kim Mitchell
2010	Trooper, David Wilcox, Big Sugar
2011	Bleaker Ridge, Whale Tooth and Finger Eleven | Sister Act and The Caverners
2012	The Trews, Sloan
2013	The Tea Party with Bleaker Ridge and TimeGiant, April Wine
2014	Moist, IllScarlett
2015	I Mother Earth, Big Wreck, Junkhouse
2016	Finger Eleven, Kim Mitchell, David Wilcox
2017	Headstones, Big Sugar, The Sadies
2018	54-40, Blue Rodeo, The Lowest of the Low
