= Georgetown District High School =

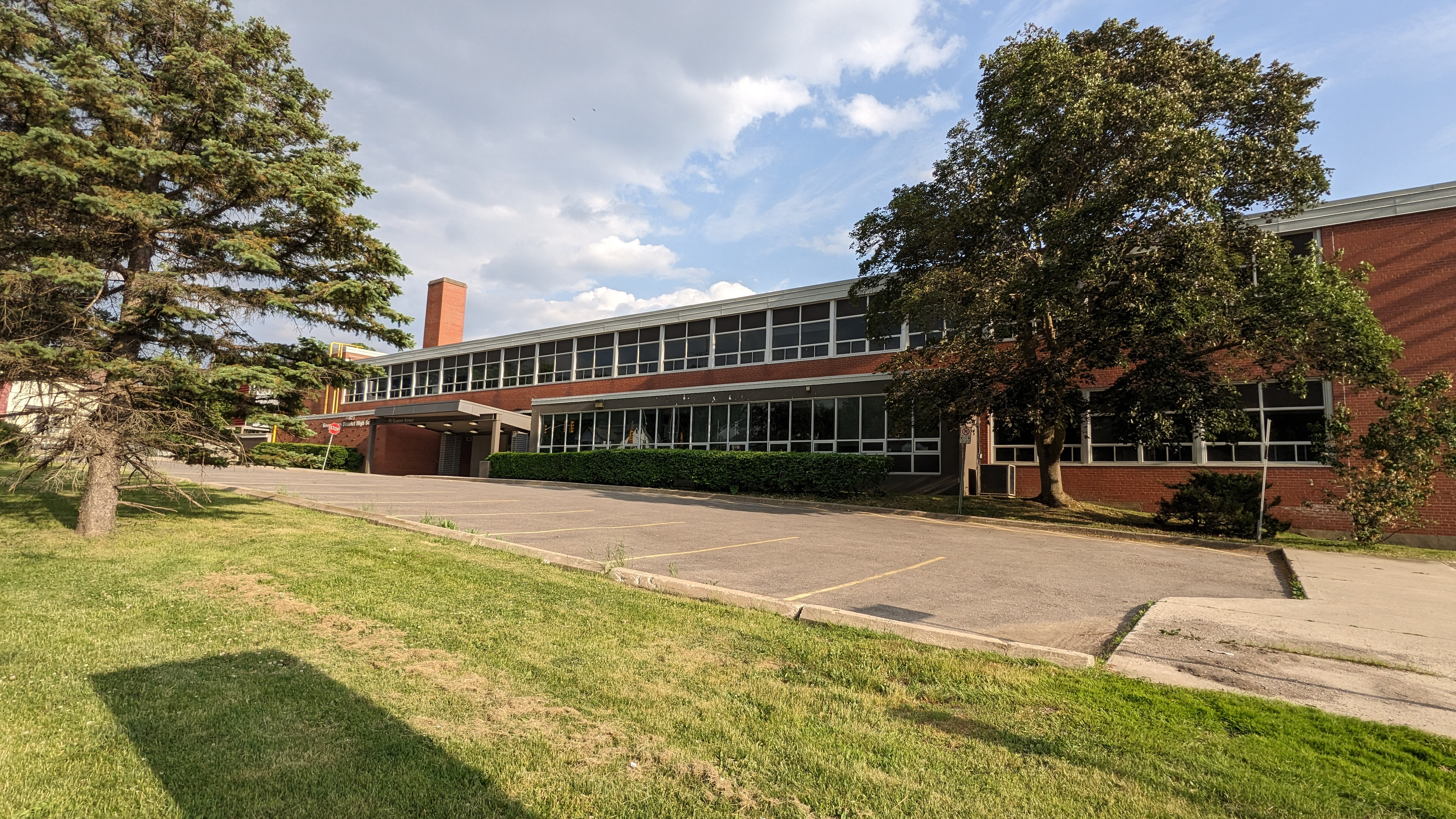
- Exterior from Guelph Street

Location
- 70 Guelph Street; Georgetown, Ontario; Canada; 43.65031°N 79.92098°W

Information
- Type: Public
- Opened: 1887
- School district: Halton District School Board
- Principal: Steve Oliver
- Grades: 9-12
- Gender: Coeducational
- Enrolment: 1,493
- Campus: Suburban
- Colour
- Mascot: Bulldog
- Team name: 87s
- Rival: Christ the King
- Provincial Ranking: 145 / 747 In Secondary Schools
- Website: geo.hdsb.ca

Georgetown District High School (GDHS) is a high school located in Georgetown, Ontario, Canada. The school is under the jurisdiction of the Halton District School Board. As of the 2019–20 school year, approximately 1,500 students were enrolled at Georgetown District High School.

== History ==
Georgetown District High School was first opened on January 3, 1887. At the time, there were a total of 69 students, with 2 teachers. In 2012 the school celebrated its 125th anniversary with a ceremony and town festivities. The cost to build GDHS was $12,000, and it was designed by Canadian architect Edward J. Lennox

== Athletics and nickname controversy ==
Georgetown's swimming team has consistently placed in the top 3 or won the OFSAA championships. The GDHS swim program has won 49 OFSAA titles starting in 1981. GDHS are the current OFSAA champions (2026) and have won the last twelve overall titles, setting the record for most consecutive OFSAA wins in history, in any sport.

=== "Rebels" ===
Until 1961, the school's nickname used in athletic competitions, was "the G's", until a schoolwide competition prompted by an improving football team resulted in a change to "Rebels"—a name inspired, according to the proponents, by rebellious notions current at the time, and a fancy for the movie Rebel Without A Cause and the song "Rebel-'Rouser". A logo was devised of a fox with an eye patch (and a "rebel hat"), symbolizing "the valiant underdog, the fearless fighter, the humble warrior"; The Confederate flag was added later, including on athletic jerseys. Only one teacher, Lyn McLaren, protested at the time, realizing the associations prompted by the nickname and the flag. One student, in a letter to a newspaper in 2004 (after McLaren's death), recollected "events like slave day with the yearbook showing an awkward photograph of a black student as a slave. I recall the rebel flag and the overt bigotry. I recall Jewish teachers hiding their ethnicity".

In the wake of the 2015 Charleston church shooting, the association with racism and slavery was again questioned, though there had been earlier protests, including by an opposing wrestler of African descent in the 1980s; after 1992 the flag no longer appeared in the yearbook. By 2015, the flag had been removed, though the nickname stuck. The official process to change the nickname took place in the spring of 2017, and by the fall the nickname had been dropped. In 2019 the new nickname, "87s", was unveiled.

== 2019 Weapons incident ==
At approximately 2:30pm on April 19, 2019 police were alerted to what appeared to be individuals carrying weapons on school grounds. The school was immediately put under lockdown until police could clear each room in the school to confirm that the threat subsided. It took several hours for the lockdown to be fully lifted with some students being trapped in their classrooms as a result until 6:45pm.

It was quickly discovered that there was no threat since the suspected weapons were actually fake props taken from the drama room of the school. The perpetrators were subsequently apprehended by police and some faced charges. No injuries were reported.

== See also ==
- Education in Ontario
- List of secondary schools in Ontario
- Christ the King Catholic Secondary School
