= Port Colborne =

- City (lower-tier)
- City of Port Colborne
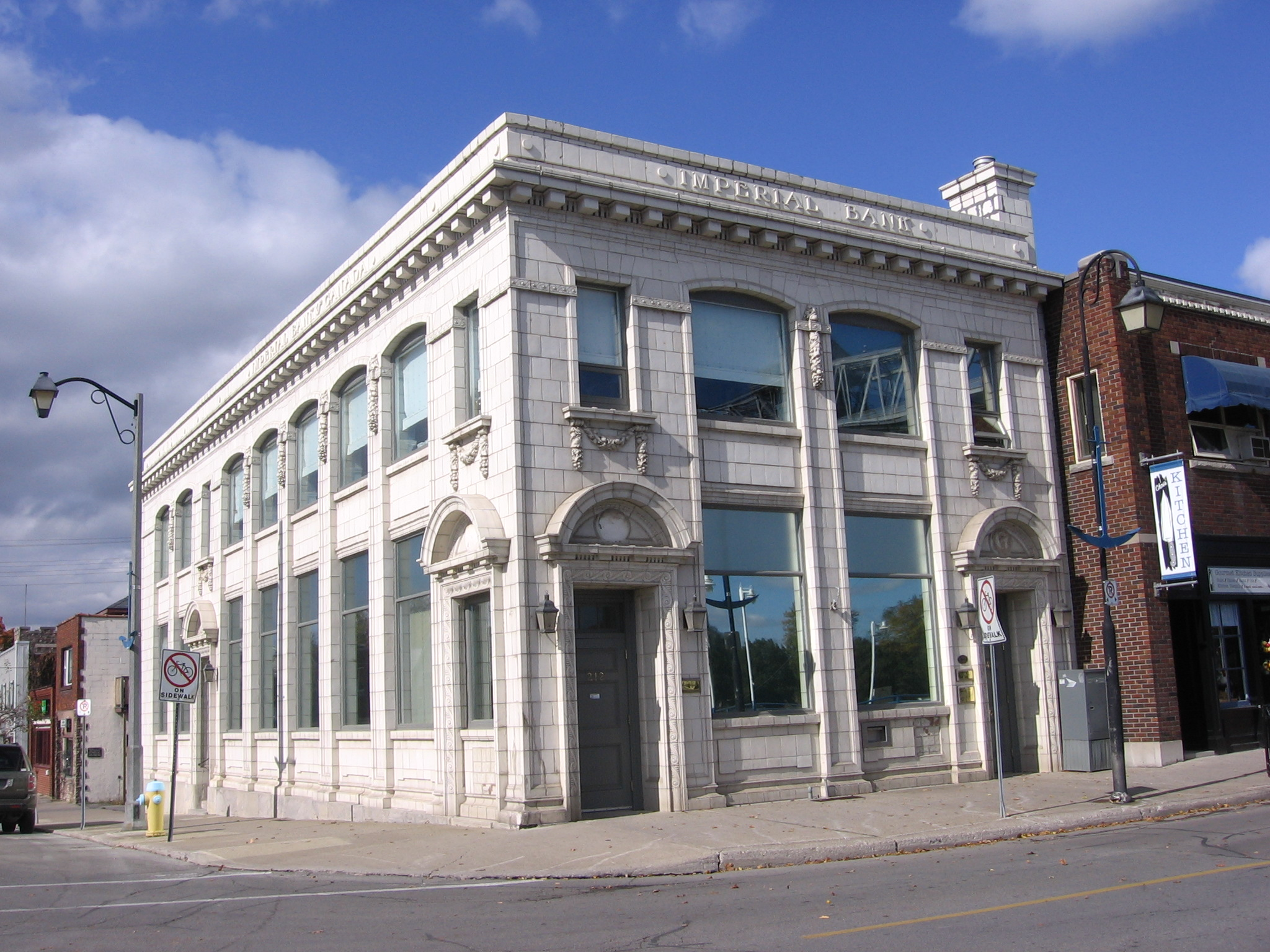
- Former bank building on West Street in Port Colborne

- Seal
- Motto: "Gateway to Navigation"
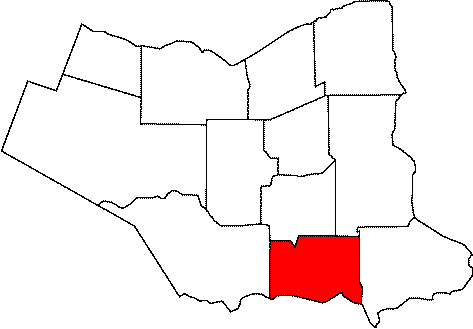
- Location of Port Colborne in the Niagara Region

- Location in southern Ontario
- Coordinates: 42°53′N 79°15′W
- Country: Canada
- Province: Ontario
- Region: Niagara
- Settled: 1830s
- Incorporated: 1870 (village)
- 1966 (city)

Government
  - Mayor: William Steele
  - MP: Fred Davies
  - MPP: Jeff Burch

Area
  - Land: 121.96 km^{2} (47.09 sq mi)
- Elevation: 175.30 m (575.1 ft)

Population (2021)
  - City (lower-tier): 20,033
  - Density: 164.2/km^{2} (425/sq mi)
  - Urban: N/a
- Demonym: Port Colbornite
- Time zone: UTC-5 (EST)
  - Summer (DST): UTC-4 (EDT)
- Forward Sortation Area: L3K
- Area codes: 905, 289, 365, and 742
- GNBC Code: FCHYP
- Website: portcolborne.ca

Port Colborne is a city in Ontario, Canada that is located on Lake Erie, at the southern end of the Welland Canal, in the Niagara Region of Southern Ontario. The original settlement, known as Gravelly Bay, dates from 1832 and was renamed after Sir John Colborne, a British war hero and the Lieutenant Governor of Upper Canada at the time of the opening of the (new) southern terminus of the First Welland Canal in 1833. The city's population in 2021 was 20,033.

== History ==
In pre-colonial times, Indigenous people of the Onguiaahra (Neutral Iroquois) lived in the area, due in part to the ready availability of flint and chert from outcroppings on the Onondaga Escarpment. This advantage was diminished by the introduction of firearms by European traders, and they were driven out by the Six Nations of the Iroquois around 1650 as part of the Beaver Wars.

Originally called Gravelly Bay, after the shallow, bedrock-floored bay upon which it sits, today's City of Port Colborne traces its roots back to the United Empire Loyalist settlements that grew up in the area following the American Revolution. Growth became focused around the southern terminus of the Welland Canal after it reached Lake Erie in 1833. The town was the location of the Port Colborne explosion, a grain elevator explosion in 1919 that killed 10 and injured 16.

As the population rose, Welland County was formed in 1845 from Lincoln County and Port Colborne was incorporated as a village in 1870, became a town in 1918, merged with the neighbouring Village of Humberstone in 1952, and was re-incorporated as a city in 1966. In 1970, Niagara Region municipal restructuring added Humberstone Township, further expanding the city.

In the year 1888, American tourists from the Southern states began building vacation homes on the lakeshore of the Western edge of the town. By 1890, an entire gated community of vacationers from the US South called Port Colborne their home during the summer months, naming the community The Humberstone Club. Over 30 grand summer homes, along with a variety of clubhouses and service buildings, were built along the lake in the following years, many of which still stand today on historic Tennessee Avenue. The southern architecture and style of these buildings would influence the design and construction of other historic buildings in the area. During the American Civil War, Varina Davis, wife of Confederacy President Jefferson Davis, spent three years in the relative comfort and safety of the community.

Port Colborne was one of the hardest hit communities during the Blizzard of 1977. Thousands of people were stranded when the city was paralyzed during the storm, and the incident remains one of significance to the local population.

=== Environmental concerns ===
Emissions from Inco's base metal refinery, closed in 1984, resulted in soils contaminated with concentrations of nickel, copper and cobalt above the Ontario Ministry of the Environment's "soil remediation criteria." However, two studies, one in 1997 and another in 1999 found "[no] adverse health effects which may have resulted from environmental exposures." After a series of public meetings between the City, the Ministry of the Environment (MOE) and Inco, it was decided to perform a Community-Based Risk Assessment, a process designed to determine whether the contamination poses a threat to the current, past, or future residents of Port Colborne, and what Inco must do to clean up the contaminated areas.

Residents began class action against Inco in 2001 seeking $750 million in damages to health, property value, and quality-of-life. Although this suit failed to be certified in 2002, it was subsequently modified to limit the class, and focus solely on devaluation of property and was certified on appeal on November 18, 2005. A timeline of the case has been written from the point of view of the plaintiffs.

On July 6, 2010, the Ontario Supreme Court sided with the residents and awarded more than 7,000 households in Port Colborne a total of $36 million. Households in the Rodney Street area, in the shadow of the nickel refinery, were each awarded $23,000 while those living on the east and west sides of Port Colborne were each awarded $9,000 and $2,500 respectively. Vale appealed the ruling to the Ontario Court of Appeal, which found in 2010 that the plaintiff had not provided sufficient evidence of economic harm, raising the legal burden of proof but not invalidating Rylands v Fletcher as precedent law. In April 2012 the Supreme Court of Canada sided with Vale and denied the residents the awarded compensation. Court costs in the amount of CAD$1,766,000 were awarded the defendant by Henderson, J.

== Geography ==
=== Climate ===
Climate data for Port Colborne (1981−2010)
| Month | Jan | Feb | Mar | Apr | May | Jun | Jul | Aug | Sep | Oct | Nov | Dec | Year |
|---|---|---|---|---|---|---|---|---|---|---|---|---|---|
| Record high °C (°F) | 15.0 (59.0) | 16.0 (60.8) | 24.0 (75.2) | 32.5 (90.5) | 31.5 (88.7) | 33.5 (92.3) | 35.0 (95.0) | 33.0 (91.4) | 31.0 (87.8) | 27.2 (81.0) | 20.0 (68.0) | 18.0 (64.4) | 35.0 (95.0) |
| Mean daily maximum °C (°F) | −0.4 (31.3) | 0.6 (33.1) | 4.8 (40.6) | 11.5 (52.7) | 17.9 (64.2) | 23.1 (73.6) | 25.9 (78.6) | 25.4 (77.7) | 21.3 (70.3) | 14.8 (58.6) | 8.7 (47.7) | 2.7 (36.9) | 13.0 (55.4) |
| Daily mean °C (°F) | −3.7 (25.3) | −2.9 (26.8) | 0.8 (33.4) | 7.0 (44.6) | 13.2 (55.8) | 18.7 (65.7) | 21.9 (71.4) | 21.3 (70.3) | 17.4 (63.3) | 11.0 (51.8) | 5.5 (41.9) | −0.4 (31.3) | 9.2 (48.6) |
| Mean daily minimum °C (°F) | −6.9 (19.6) | −6.5 (20.3) | −3.2 (26.2) | 2.4 (36.3) | 8.5 (47.3) | 14.4 (57.9) | 17.8 (64.0) | 17.2 (63.0) | 13.4 (56.1) | 7.3 (45.1) | 2.2 (36.0) | −3.4 (25.9) | 5.3 (41.5) |
| Record low °C (°F) | −26 (−15) | −25 (−13) | −24 (−11) | −11.5 (11.3) | −3.5 (25.7) | 2.2 (36.0) | 6.0 (42.8) | 5.0 (41.0) | −0.5 (31.1) | −6.1 (21.0) | −11.5 (11.3) | −26 (−15) | −26 (−15) |
| Average precipitation mm (inches) | 73.1 (2.88) | 57.0 (2.24) | 66.8 (2.63) | 76.1 (3.00) | 89.7 (3.53) | 78.9 (3.11) | 82.2 (3.24) | 82.5 (3.25) | 98.0 (3.86) | 90.4 (3.56) | 100.9 (3.97) | 88.8 (3.50) | 984.6 (38.76) |
| Average rainfall mm (inches) | 32.5 (1.28) | 26.9 (1.06) | 46.6 (1.83) | 71.9 (2.83) | 89.1 (3.51) | 78.9 (3.11) | 82.2 (3.24) | 82.5 (3.25) | 98.0 (3.86) | 89.7 (3.53) | 95.2 (3.75) | 53.2 (2.09) | 846.8 (33.34) |
| Average snowfall cm (inches) | 40.5 (15.9) | 30.1 (11.9) | 20.2 (8.0) | 4.2 (1.7) | 0.6 (0.2) | 0.0 (0.0) | 0.0 (0.0) | 0.0 (0.0) | 0.0 (0.0) | 0.8 (0.3) | 5.8 (2.3) | 35.6 (14.0) | 137.7 (54.2) |
| Average precipitation days (≥ 0.2 mm) | 15.2 | 11.1 | 12.5 | 13.8 | 13.3 | 11.2 | 10.6 | 10.3 | 11.8 | 13.4 | 15.1 | 14.9 | 153.2 |
| Average rainy days (≥ 0.2 mm) | 6.2 | 5.3 | 8.7 | 13.2 | 13.3 | 11.2 | 10.6 | 10.3 | 11.8 | 13.4 | 13.9 | 9.0 | 127.1 |
| Average snowy days (≥ 0.2 cm) | 9.6 | 6.6 | 4.5 | 1.4 | 0.08 | 0.0 | 0.0 | 0.0 | 0.0 | 0.12 | 1.9 | 7.1 | 31.3 |
Source: Environment Canada.

=== Communities ===
Communities within the city include:

- Bethel - Chippawa Road and Yager Road
- Cedar Bay - Cedar Bay Road and Vimy Road
- East Village
- Elco Beach - Wyldewood Road and Fireland 15
- Gasline - Pinecrest Road and Vimy Road
- Humberstone - Killaly Street and Highway 3
- Lorraine - Weaver Road and Firelane 1
- Nickel Beach - foot of Lake Road
- Pine Crest Point - Pincrest Road and Firelane 2
- Pleasant Beach
- Sherkston
- Sherkston Beaches
- Shisler Point
- Silver Bay
- Sugar Loaf Point/Sugar Loaf Marina - west side of Gravelly Bay

== Demographics ==
Port Colborne
| Year | Pop. | ±% |
|---|---|---|
| 1871 | 1,500 | — |
| 1901 | 1,253 | −16.5% |
| 1911 | 1,624 | +29.6% |
| 1921 | 3,415 | +110.3% |
| 1931 | 6,503 | +90.4% |
| 1941 | 6,928 | +6.5% |
| 1951 | 8,275 | +19.4% |
| 1961 | 14,886 | +79.9% |
| 1971 | 21,420 | +43.9% |
| 1981 | 19,225 | −10.2% |
| 1991 | 18,766 | −2.4% |
| 2001 | 18,450 | −1.7% |
| 2006 | 18,599 | +0.8% |
| 2011 | 18,424 | −0.9% |
| 2016 | 18,306 | −0.6% |
| 2021 | 20,033 | +9.4% |

In the 2021 Census of Population conducted by Statistics Canada, Port Colborne had a population of 20,033 living in 8,710 of its 10,219 total private dwellings, a change of 9.4% from its 2016 population of 18,306. With a land area of 121.99 km^{2} (47.10 sq mi), it had a population density of 164.2/km^{2} (425.3/sq mi) in 2021.

Canada census – Port Colborne community profile

| | 2021 | 2016 | 2011 |
| Population | 20,033 (+9.4% from 2016) | 18,306 (-0.6% from 2011) | 18,424 (-0.9% from 2006) |
| Land area | 121.99 km^{2} (47.10 sq mi) | 121.96 km^{2} (47.09 sq mi) | 121.97 km^{2} (47.09 sq mi) |
| Population density | 164.2/km^{2} (425/sq mi) | 150.1/km^{2} (389/sq mi) | 151.1/km^{2} (391/sq mi) |
| Median age | 50.4 (M: 48.8, F: 52) | 50.0 (M: 48.8, F: 51.1) | 47.5 (M: 46.4, F: 48.6) |
| Private dwellings | 10,219 (total) | 9,825 (total) | 10,083 (total) |
| Median household income | | $57,244 |

References: 2021 2016 2011

== Economy ==
Maritime commerce, including supplying goods to the camps for the labourers who worked on the first canal, ship repair and the provisioning trade, was, and still is, an important part of Port Colborne's economy. Like other cities in the region, Port Colborne was a heavily industrial city throughout most of the early 20th century because of its proximity to the hydroelectric power of Niagara Falls. A grain elevator, two modern flour mills, a nickel refinery, a cement plant operated by Canada Cement, and a blast furnace operated by Algoma Steel were all major employers.

As recently as 2017, Port Colborne has been successful attracting new industry, such as the agro-business operations of Casco Inc. and Jungbunzlauer, which process corn into products such as sweeteners and citric acid.

The International Nickel Company (now Vale) has long been one of the city's main employers, since a World War I scandal prompted the opening of a refinery in 1918. Taking advantage of inexpensive hydroelectricity from generating stations at nearby Niagara Falls, from 1922 the refinery produced electrolytic nickel and Platinum group metals. It grew to employ over 2,000 workers by the 1950s. Cutbacks in operations and increasing factory automation have reduced the workforce to its present-day (2018) total of 170.

Marine Recycling Corporation is a ship recycling firm, boasting of Green (environmentally friendly) services, located next to the Welland Canal at Gravelly Bay and operating since the 1970s.

A 2012 report indicates the following as the largest private sector employers, with a staff of over 50, in Port Colborne at that time:

- Port Colborne Poultry (Pinty's Delicious Foods, now owned by Olymel), 229 employees
- Vale Canada Limited, 200
- J. Oskam Steel Fabricators Ltd., 150
- IMT Partnership, 108
- ADM Milling, 95
- Thurston Machine Co. Ltd., 85
- JTL Machine Ltd., 78
- Jungbunzlauer Canada Inc., 74
- Brennan Paving Ltd., 70
- Ingredion Canada Inc., 70

== Arts and culture ==
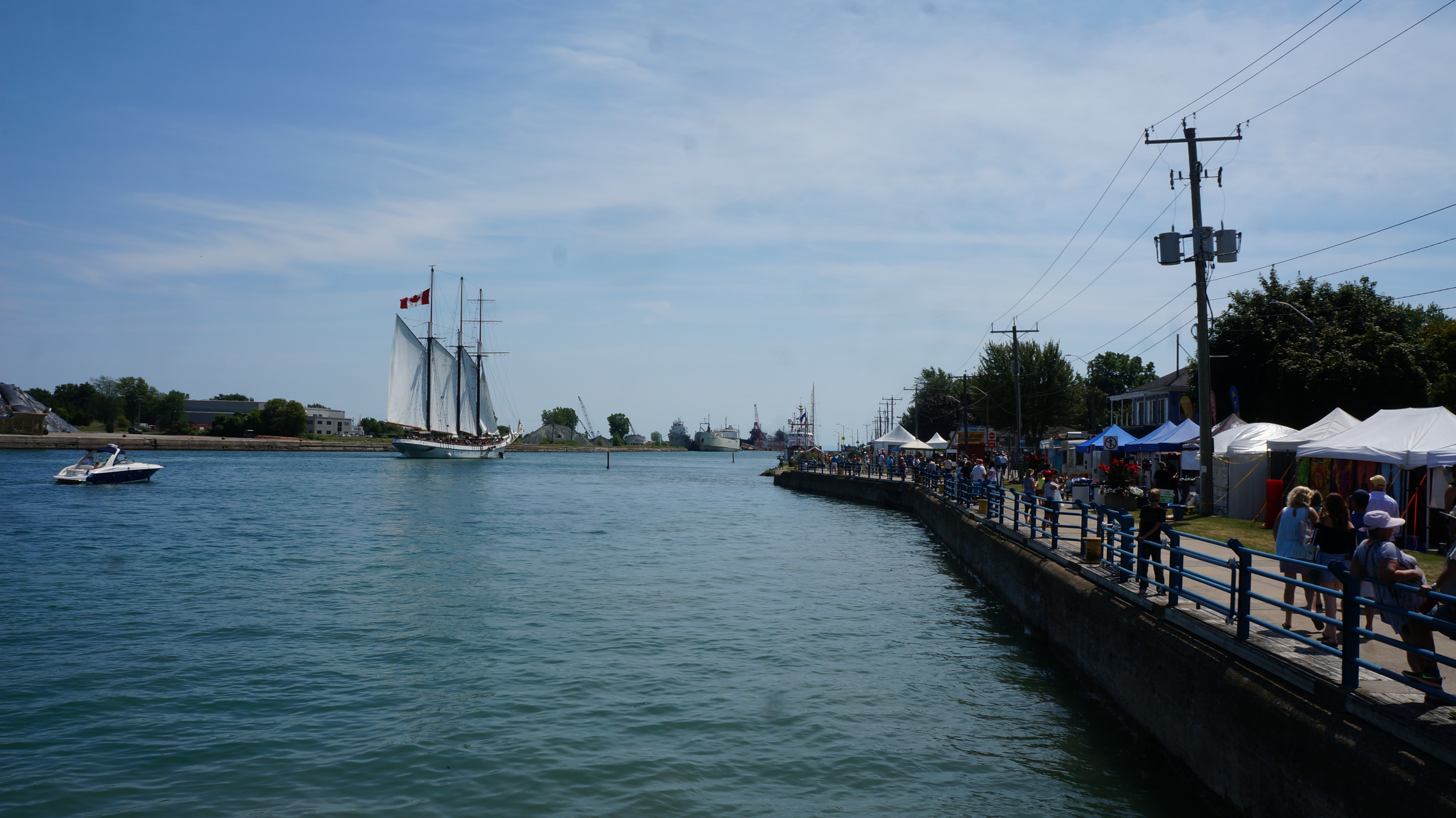
Canal Days 2019

Port Colborne hosts the annual Canal Days festival in recognition of the important role played by the Welland Canal in the history of the city. Originating as a small fair held at the Port Colborne Historical and Marine Museum, it has grown to feature live music, an antique car show, fireworks, tall ships, a kite festival, and international foods. The festival also highlights Lock 8, which at 420 m (1,380 ft), is one of the world's longest canal locks. Lock 8 keeps the water level on the Welland Canal constant independent of weather on Lake Erie. Hence the ships are only raised or lowered one to four feet depending on the current water level in Lake Erie. Much of the festival centres around West St., which runs parallel to the canal, and offers a view of the Clarence St. Bridge, built in 1929, it is one of only three remaining lift bridges on the canal today.

The Port Colborne Historical and Marine Museum, located near the centre of town, is a resource for local history and archival research. In addition to a collection of historic buildings and artifacts, it opened the "Marie Semley Research Wing" to foster research into local history, named to commemorate the long-standing efforts of a local resident who devoted hours to the museum.

The community features theatre venues with the professional Lighthouse Festival Theatre (formerly Showboat) and the amateur Port Colborne Operatic Society. The company has been presenting annual productions since its inception in 1945.

The Port Colborne Lions Club, chartered in 1922, is one of the world's oldest Lions Clubs, and one of Canada's oldest service clubs in continuous operation. The club is still active within the community, hosting many yearly events including an annual Lions Club Carnival in the summer.

Kinnear House is a local heritage property associated with the jurist Helen Kinnear, the first woman in Canada to be appointed judge by the federal government, or to appear as counsel before the Supreme Court.

The "incredible shrinking mill" is an optical illusion produced when viewing the federal grain elevator in Port Colborne. When travelling east on Lakeshore Road, the mill appears to move farther away as one drives closer.

== Attractions ==
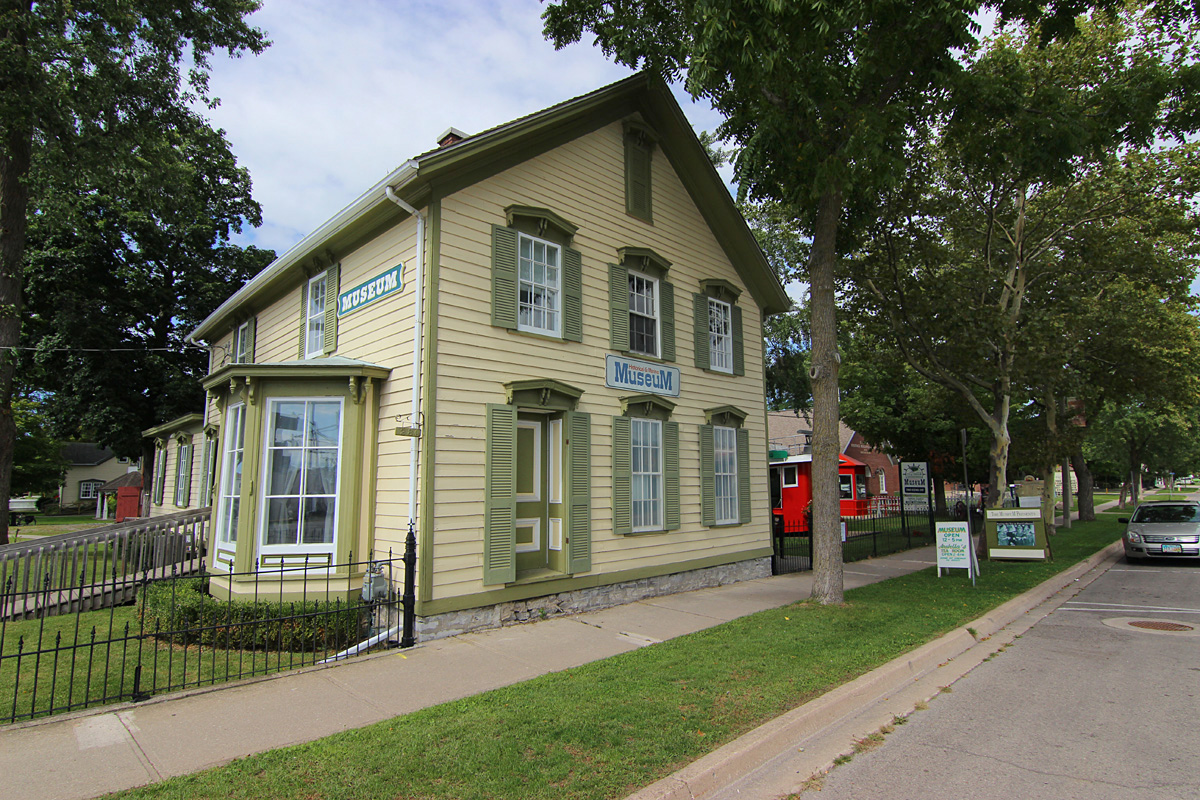
Port Colborne Historical and Marine Museum

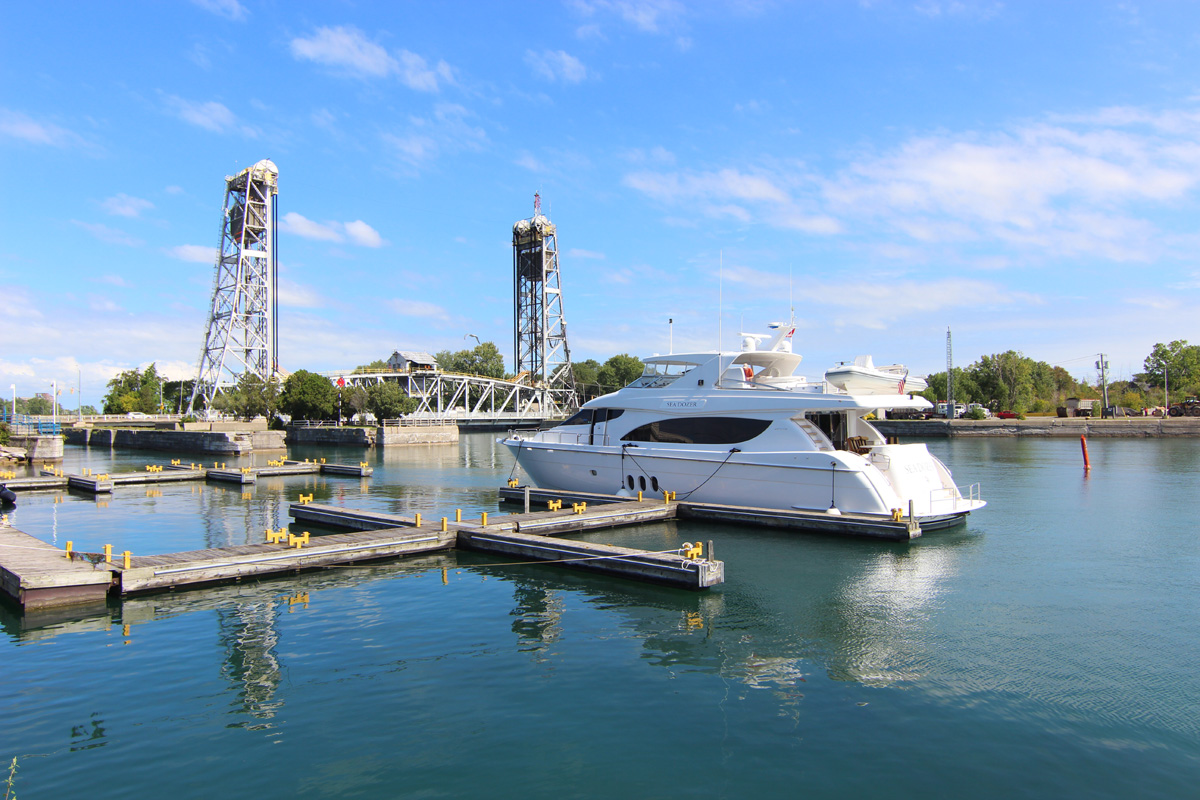
Welland Canal in Port Colborne

Tourism is important to the Port Colborne's economy, aided by the city's proximity to Lake Erie beaches and marinas, and to Niagara Falls. In 2015, Port Colborne formed The Tourism and Marketing Advisory Committee to provide advice and recommendations for increasing this aspect of the economy. Described by the city as "Niagara's South Coast", Port Colborne features live theatre, golfing, multi-use trails, fishing, beaches, restaurants, recreation, a marina, and shopping districts along the Welland Canal.

Notable sites in Port Colborne include:

- The Welland Canal
- Port Colborne Port Promenade
- The Friendship Trail
- HH Knoll Lakeview Park
- The Welland Canals Parkways Trail
- Nickel Beach
- Lock 8 Gateway Park
- Sugarloaf Harbour Marina
- Historical and Marine Museum
- Vale Centre (twin pad arena and YMCA featuring pool, gyms and bocce courts)
- Thomas A. Lannan Sports Complex

== Education ==
There are two high schools in Port Colborne, Port Colborne High School (commonly called Port High) and the Lakeshore Catholic High School (formerly a public high school called Lockview Park Secondary School). Lockview closed in 1987.

== Notable people ==
- David Lametti, federal Minister of Justice
- Tony Dekker, singer/songwriter of folk band Great Lake Swimmers
- Jim Gregory, NHL General Manager (Toronto Maple Leafs)
- Ted 'Teeder' Kennedy, NHL hockey player
- Helen Kinnear, first woman appointed judge by the federal government
- Joseph "Bronco" Horvath, NHL hockey player
- Floyd G. Robinson, teacher and educator
- Melissa McIntyre, actress (Degrassi: The Next Generation)
- Don Simmons, NHL hockey player
- Lynton 'Red' Wilson, former CEO of BCE Inc., chancellor of McMaster University, and officer of the Order of Canada
- DeFranco Family, 1970s pop group
- Francis William "Dinty" Moore, goaltender for the 1936 Canadian men's Olympic hockey team
- Lieutenant Colonel Russell Lambert Boyle, Commanding Officer of the 10th Battalion, Canadian Expeditionary Force. Killed at the 2nd Battle of Ypres, April 1915.
- Alexis Davis, mixed martial artist
- Elmer Iseler, choral conductor
- Matt Craven, actor
- Vance Badawey, politician
- Bill McBirnie, award-winning jazz flautist
