= Ontario Student Trustees' Association =

Ontario Student Trustees' Association / l'Association des élèves conseillers et conseillères de l'Ontario
- Company type: Public; Nonprofit organization
- Industry: Education, Advocacy
- Founded: 2000 in Toronto, Ontario, Canada
- Headquarters: 5-112 Elizabeth Street, Suite 285 Toronto, ON, M5G 1P5
- Key people: Nanak Sidhu (President); Siobhán Marie (CEO); Arjun Dhanjal (Chairperson)
- Website: www.osta-aeco.org

The Ontario Student Trustees' Association (French: l'Association des élèves conseillers et conseillères de l'Ontario), officially branded as OSTA-AECO, is a registered nonprofit, nonpartisan organization and the largest student stakeholder group in Ontario. The organization's members are student trustees from English school boards across the province.

OSTA-AECO's mandate is to advocate on behalf of students at the provincial level, working closely with the Ministry of Education and other educational stakeholders. OSTA-AECO also provides professional development for Ontario's student trustees in the form of three annual conferences.

The organization's General Assembly is composed of student trustees representing 31 English Public and 29 English Catholic school boards across Ontario. The association is divided into the Public Board Council (PBC) and the Catholic Board Council (CBC), which focus on initiatives specific to each educational system.

== History ==
OSTA-AECO was formed by a group of student trustees from the English Public, English Catholic, French Public and French Catholic systems, with a vision of uniting student voices. The inaugural meeting of OSTA-AECO occurred in Toronto in 2000.

In the early 1990s, the Royal Commission of Learning, created during the leadership of then-Premier Bob Rae, published a report titled "For the Love of Learning" which recommended "that all [school] boards have at least one student member, entitled to vote on all board matters, subject to the usual conflict-of-interest and legal requirements" and that this student member would be elected by students.

In 1997, the Progressive Conservative government under Premier Mike Harris introduced "The Education Quality Improvement Act" as Bill 160. The Bill enshrined the position of a "pupil representative" to provide the student perspective on school board governance. By 1998, every school board was mandated to have at least one "pupil representative". In 2006, the position was formally named "student trustee" under the Liberal government of Premier Dalton McGuinty and the leadership of Education Minister Gerard Kennedy.

In May 2008, French Public and French Catholic student trustees officially separated from OSTA-AECO to establish the Regroupement des élèves conseiller.ère.s francophones de l’Ontario (RECFO), following several years of calls for an organization that could more effectively represent the voices and interests of Francophone student trustees.

The Executive Council of OSTA-AECO and the Board Council Cabinets are elected annually at the organization's Annual General Meeting (AGM). The board of directors is appointed at the AGM on a biennial basis.

== Activities ==
On 10 January 2018, OSTA-AECO unveiled The Student Platform at a Queen's Park press release. Titled A Turning Point for Education, the Platform reflects three fundamental pillars of a student's educational experience: Student Wellbeing, 21st Century Learning and Equitable Access to Opportunities. The pillars were developed in accordance to the results of OSTA-AECO's Student Survey, which received responses from 8,230 students representing 62 school boards in Ontario. The Student Platform features 16 policy recommendations for the political parties to implement in their education platforms for the 2018 provincial election. The release garnered widespread provincial and national media attention from outlets.

On 6 May 2019, OSTA-AECO released the OSTA-AECO Vision Document: The Students' Vision for Education, in a press conference at Queen's Park and Queen's Park Briefing.

The Association has also contributed by sharing policy targeted at specific school board through a policy of sharing such as the Menstrual Equity project which has been undertaken by many Trustees from the GEDSB, the TDSB, the TVDSB, the PDSB, the WRDSB and the OCDSB.
