= Port Colborne High School =

Location
- 211 Elgin Street; Port Colborne, Ontario, L3K 3K4; Canada; 42.8888°N 79.2584°W

Information
- Funding type: Public
- Motto: Ad Astra Per Ardua (To the stars through adversity)
- Founded: 1923
- School board: District School Board of Niagara
- School number: (905) 835-1186
- Principal: Angela McClary
- Grades: 9–12
- Enrollment: 550
- Colours: Blue and White
- Mascot: Blue the Bear
- Team name: Blue Bears
- Yearbook: Tattler
- Communities served: Port Colborne, Wainfleet, Dain City, Sherkston, Stevensville
- Website: www.porthigh.com

Port Colborne High School, commonly known as Port High, is a high school in Port Colborne, just north of the eastern edge of Lake Erie, Ontario, Canada. It is part of the District School Board of Niagara and has been serving the communities of Wainfleet and Port Colborne since the 1920s. The school serves students from communities in Wainfleet, Dunnville, Dain City, and Port Colborne.

== History ==
The History of Port Colborne High School dates back to 1920, when the town of Port Colborne became a focal point of many new industries. The arrival of the International Nickel Company of Canada (INCO) in 1918, the prospering businesses of Canada Furnace, Maple Leaf Mills and Canada Cement along with the building of the fourth Welland Canal brought many new residents and their families to the town. A need for an educational institution was realized. In 1920, the Port Colborne School Board purchased four acres of land from Dewitt Carter on the corner of Steele and Elgin Streets. Building started in 1920 and in 1921 the Port Colborne Continuation School opened its doors for the first time with four classrooms, a science lab, and a gymnasium (currently the theatre). This school offered students in Port Colborne grades 9–11. If a student wanted to further their education after grade 11 they needed to travel to Welland, via trolley, to complete their fourth and fifth terms (Grade 12 and 13).

In 1922, an application was made to the Ontario Government for High School status, which was granted in 1923. The first graduates of Port High received their diplomas on December 20, 1923. The school board then consisted of 6 members, and there were only 5 teachers at Port High to teach 100 students.

In 1926, the first of many additions were built to accommodate the growing student population by adding four classrooms to the back of the existing building. Since that time there have been four other major renovations; in 1938, 6 classes, a gym, a shop class, and a home economics class room was added; in the 1960s another gym, science classes and a technical wing was built; in 1989 saw the improvement of the library and main office area, as well as many stairwells closed to make the building more energy efficient; and the latest addition being the new entrance way and foyer built in 2008.

During the late 1960s, the school housed over 1600 students with 90 teachers. The school was bursting at the seams and a new school for Port Colborne was needed. A shift system was put into place with Port High students attending school in the morning and future Lockview Park students attending in the afternoon. In February 1970 the new school, located on Janet Street, opened its doors to over 600 students. Many of these students would return to Port High for grade 13 since Lockview had only grades 9–12.

== Notable alumni ==
- John Maloney - Canadian Politician
- Theodore "Teeder" Kennedy - Former Toronto Maple Leafs Captain
- Lynton Ronald 'Red' Wilson - Business Executive
- Melissa McIntyre - Actress - Degrassi High
- Bill McBirnie - Award-winning jazz flautist

== See also ==
- Education in Ontario
- List of secondary schools in Ontario
