= St. Francis Xavier Catholic Secondary School =

Coordinates: 43.4870°N 79.8575°W

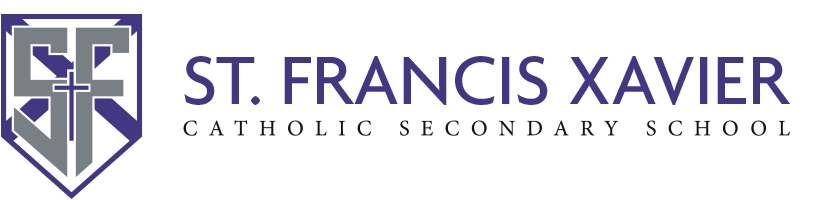

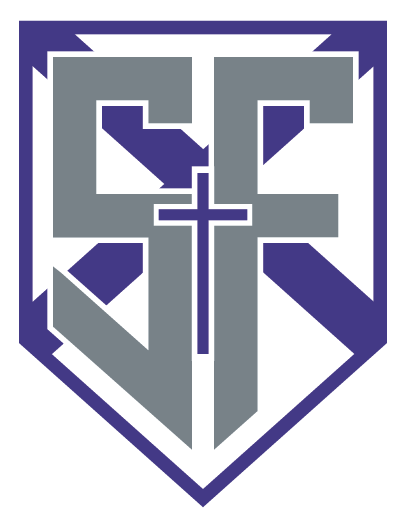

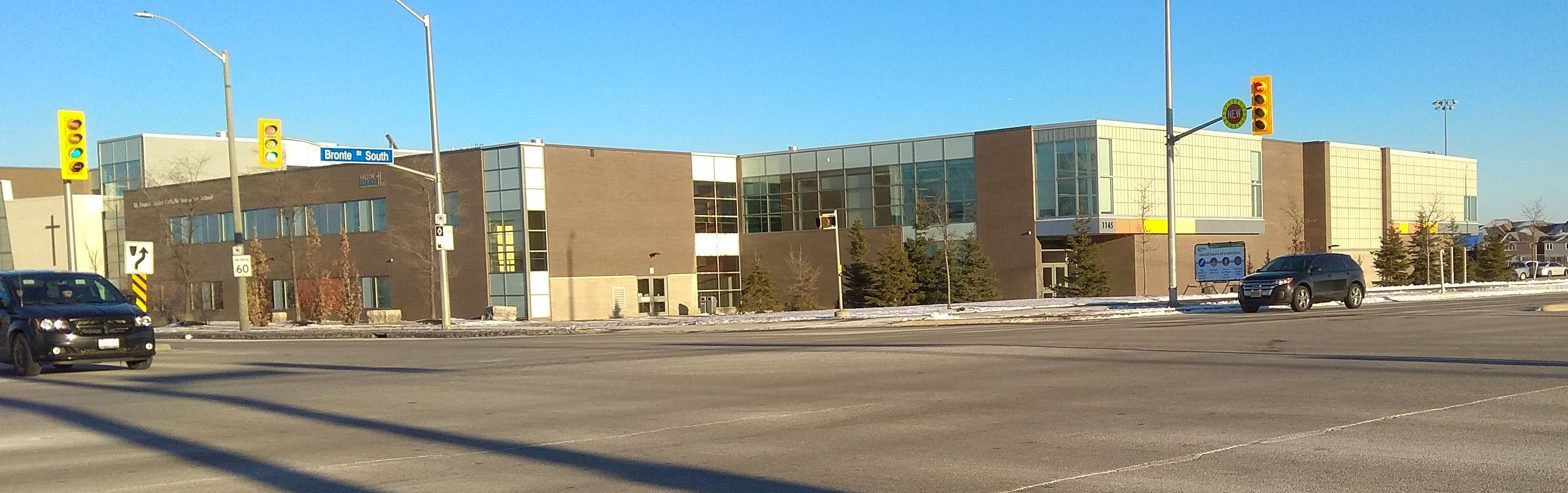

Location
- 1145 Bronte Street South; Milton, Ontario, L9T 8B4; Canada

Information
- Former name: Jean Vanier Catholic Secondary School
- School type: Secondary School
- Motto: "To Accept, Include, and Serve with Love"
- Religious affiliation: Roman Catholic
- Founded: 2013
- School board: Halton Catholic District School Board
- Superintendent: Jeff Crowell
- Principal: Adriano Perusin
- Grades: Grades 9 to 12
- Enrolment: 2,410
- Language: English
- Colours: Purple, Black and Silver
- Website: secondary.hcdsb.org/xavier/

St. Francis Xavier Catholic Secondary School (formerly known as Jean Vanier Catholic Secondary School) is an educational Catholic high school in Milton, Ontario, Canada. The 191,000 square foot building was built by the Halton Catholic District School Board in 2013.

The school was originally named after the late Jean Vanier, a Canadian Catholic philosopher turned theologian, humanitarian and the founder of L’Arche. In June 2020, however, the Halton Catholic District School Board with approval from Douglas Crosby, Bishop of Hamilton, renamed the school for St. Francis Xavier following sexual misconduct allegations surrounding Jean Vanier.

The school mascot is the StFX Knight. Extra curricular student members are known as Knights.

== See also ==
- Education in Ontario
- List of secondary schools in Ontario
