= Holy Trinity Catholic Secondary School (Oakville) =

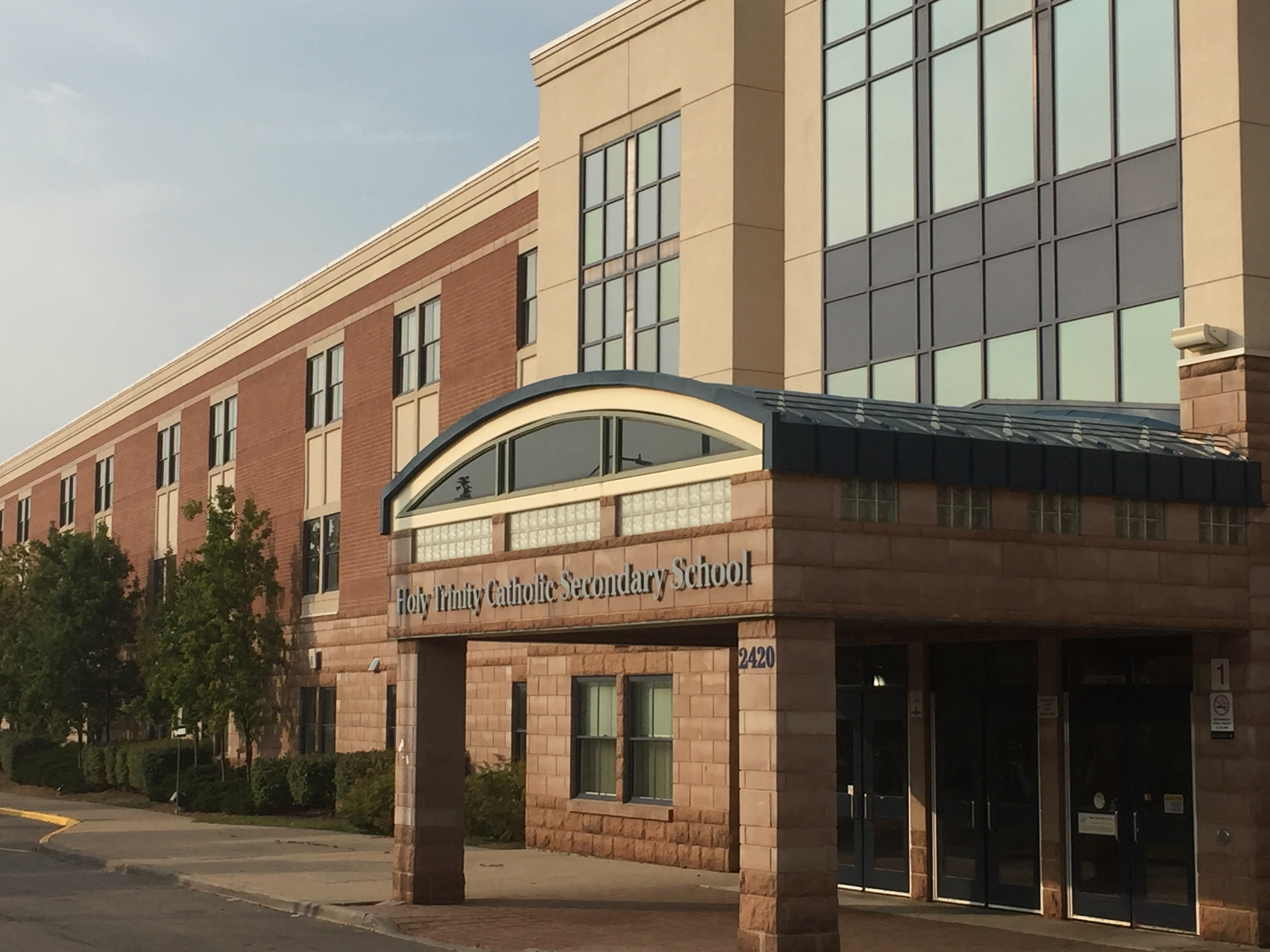

Location
- 2420 Sixth Line; Oakville, Ontario, L6H 3N8; Canada; 43.4722°N 79.7243°W

Information
- School type: Separate Secondary School
- Religious affiliation: Roman Catholic
- Founded: 2002
- School board: Halton Catholic District School Board
- Superintendent: Nancy Dinolfo
- Principal: Teresa Castellarin
- Grades: 9 to 12
- Enrolment: 1405 (2021–2022)
- Language: English and second language classes in French
- Area: Halton
- Colours: Gold, Black and White
- Nickname: "HT"
- Team name: TITANS
- Website: secondary.hcdsb.org/holytrinity/

Holy Trinity Catholic Secondary School is a separate school located in North Oakville in the River Oaks area within Oakville, Ontario, Canada. Holy Trinity is a member of the Halton Catholic District School Board.

== History ==
Holy Trinity Catholic Secondary School is a Catholic high school located in North Oakville in the River Oaks area within Oakville, Ontario. The school's construction was completed in the summer of 2002 and the school opened to new students and staff in September 2002. The school initially had only Grade 9, Grade 10 and Grade 11 students. This was Holy Trinity's first year open and the size was approximately 800 students, while the 2018-2019 student and staff member count has more than doubled in size. The 2019–2020 school year has around 1330 students enrolled in the school. Holy Trinity fosters a respectful and supportive Catholic environment that inspires all students to reach their full potential. Holy Trinity offers students a comprehensive academic curriculum, an outstanding co-curricular program, and an important Catholic learning experience that will prepare them for their post-secondary goals. HT's legendary and daily saying is "treat everyone with equity, dignity, and respect". Holy Trinity offers many specialty programs such as the most recent Advanced Placement (AP) program for grade 9 students (September 2017), Specialist High Skills Major (SHSM) Program, Extended French program, Dual Credit Course with Sheridan College and other various technology courses. Interestingly, the school is a twin build of Christ the King Catholic Secondary School in Georgetown, Ontario. The blueprints of this school are a mirror image of Holy Trinity's and both schools were opened in September 2002.

== Portable or relocatable classrooms ==
There are currently an additional twelve (12) portable classrooms situated on site for the 2023–2024 school year. In fall 2007, two separate fires ran through several portables, causing many to be replaced. Portable One was removed following the first fire and 6 years later has yet to be replaced, leaving no portable that is numbered with the number "1." These individual classrooms are placed outside of the original school building to accommodate the excess student enrolment over the building capacity of 1200 students as set by the Ontario Ministry of Education. Student enrolment in the 2007–2008 school year was a 36% enrolment increase above the permanent build facility level approved by the Ministry when the school was completed in 2002. History in Ontario has shown that many of these relocatable/portable classrooms will in fact be on site at the school for 15 to 20 or more years.

No provision is made by the Ministry for important and needed specialty classrooms for these additional students enrolled beyond the official building capacity. Academic areas needing additional academic specialized facilities for the additional four hundred students in excess of the official 1200 capacity, are in the areas of science labs, computer labs and technical education classrooms.

== Extra-curricular activities ==
Holy Trinity offers many team and individual sports:

Boys ~ Football, Badminton, Basketball, Ice Hockey, Volleyball, Soccer, Swimming, Rugby, Baseball

Girls ~ Basketball, Badminton, Ice Hockey, Volleyball, Soccer, Swimming, Field Hockey, Rugby, Tennis, Fastball.

Many teams, including Curling, Cross Country, Track and Field, Swimming, and Ultimate Frisbee are open to all students in a co-ed capacity.

The school also offers a selection of open participation extracurricular activities. Musical options include Senior and Junior Concert Bands, Jazz Band Extracurricular groups, clubs, and teams include an Environment Club, Quidditch Team, Debate Team, FIRST Robotics Competition Team (Tronic Titans 3161), Chess Team, and Ski Team.

Holy Trinity's Student Council is elected in May of the preceding school year and consists of 3 to 4 representatives from each grade, a vice-president and a president. Council runs many school events such as dances, spirit days and assemblies. Grades 10-12 can run for council at the end of the school year, while grade nines run in September. Holy Trinity's Student Athletic Council (SAC) consists of hundreds of volunteers and an elected vice-president and president. SAC is a subcommittee of Student Council.

== Varsity athletics ==
=== Fall sports ===
- Jr. Football
- Sr. Football
- Jr. Girls Basketball
- Sr. Girls Basketball
- Jr. Boys Volleyball
- Sr. Boys Volleyball
- Jr. Girls Field Hockey
- Sr. Girls Field Hockey
- Cross Country
- Baseball

=== Winter sports ===
- Mid. Boys Basketball
- Jr. Boys Basketball
- Sr. Boys Basketball
- Mid. Girls Volleyball
- Jr. Girls Volleyball
- Sr. Girls Volleyball
- Boys Varsity Hockey
- Girls Varsity Hockey
- Swim Team
- Ski & Snowboard Team
- Curling

==== Basketball ====
The Senior Boys' Basketball team has had a very successful 2018-2019 year, only losing one game the whole season. They have made it to the finals every year coming in second from 2016 to 2019.

The Senior Girls Basketball team won the Bishop Reding Tournament in 2016. In the years 2016-2017 they were undefeated until the semi-finals. In the 2018–2019 season they were the consolation champions at the Mohawk tournament. The team was undefeated until the playoffs once again. They made it to the quarter-finals this 2018–2019 season.

The Senior Boys won their first ever Halton AAAA Basketball Championship in the 2006 - 2007 season by beating the Assumption Crusaders. The undefeated Senior Boys also won the Halton title in 2012 as well as the GHAC title. They finished fourth at OFSAA (the provincial finals).

The Junior Girls won their first ever Halton AAAA Basketball Championship in the 2006 - 2007 season.

=== Early spring sports ===
- Jr. Boys Ice Hockey
- Jr. Badminton
- Sr. Badminton

=== Spring sports ===
- Jr. Girls Soccer
- Sr. Girls Soccer
- Jr. Boys Soccer
- Sr. Boys Soccer
- Jr. Girls Rugby
- Sr. Girls Rugby
- Jr. Boys Rugby
- Sr. Boys Rugby
- Track & Field
- Boys Baseball
- Girls Softball
- Tennis
- Field Lacrosse
- Ultimate frisbee

==== Soccer ====
The Senior boys soccer team captured the Halton Region championships in 2006 and competed at the OFSAA Provincial championship(2006). In 2005 the Junior varsity captured the Halton Region title. The 2016 Girls Junior Varsity team went undefeated to capture the Halton Region Title.

==== Lacrosse ====
Holy Trinity's lacrosse team has won four straight Halton championships, and competed in OFSAA in 2014–2017.

== Trinity live arts ==
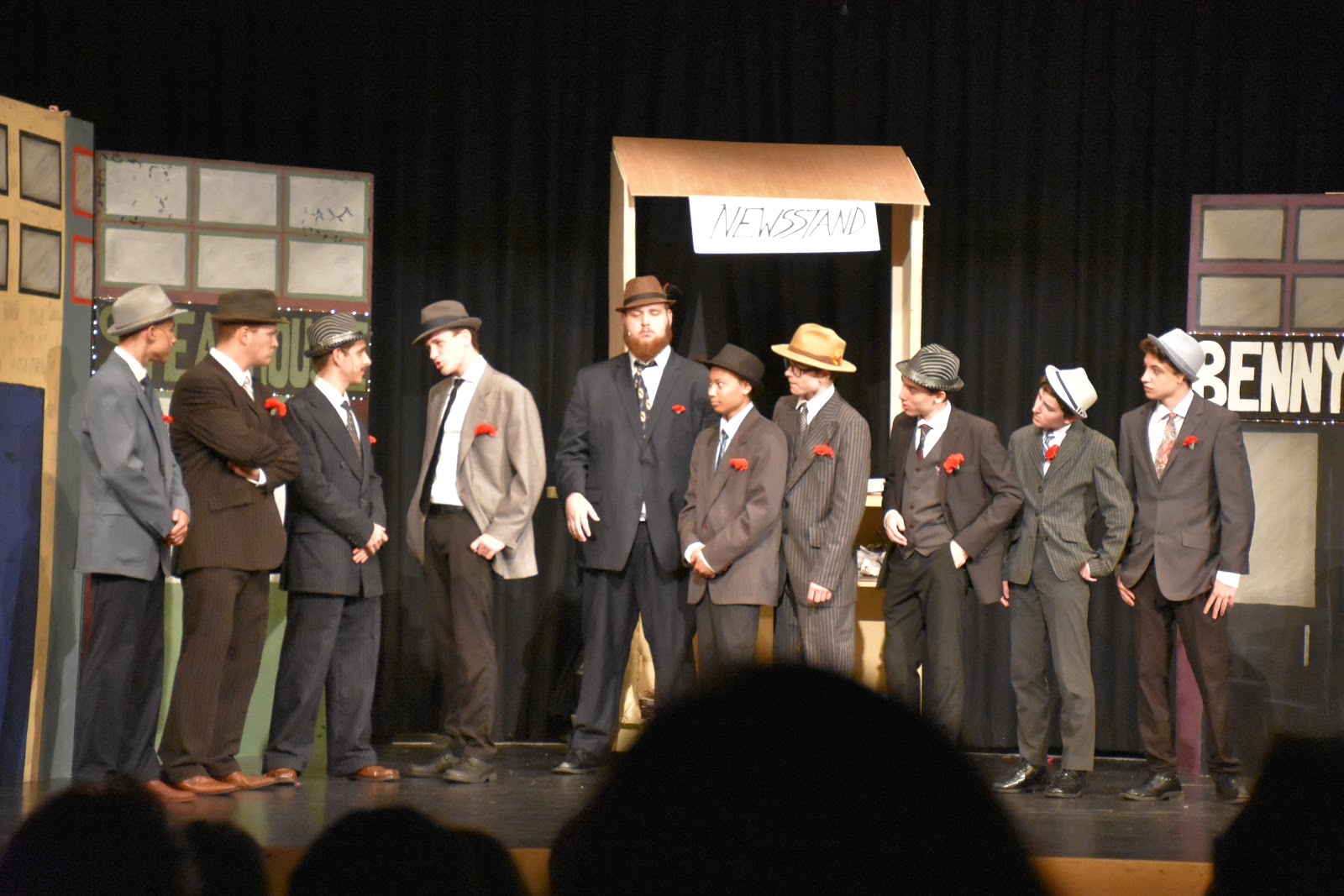
A Scene From The HT Musical Called "The Gamblers"

Theatre Trinity has always been a large part of the school and has sparked the creation of a new student club, the Student Teacher Arts Representatives (STAR) council. The STAR council has hosted an annual "Fringe Festival" which consist of student directed one act plays, this normally happens around Christmas time in the first semester. Second semester, the school normally takes on a larger production in a big play or musical led by the head of the schools drama department. In the Spring of 2017, the school put on a production of Tim Rice's "Jesus Christ Superstar" and starred seniors Olivia Ouzounis, Jacob Moro, Luca D'Amico, and Derek McVey. In the spring of 2018, the school put on a production of Frank Loesser "Guys and Dolls"

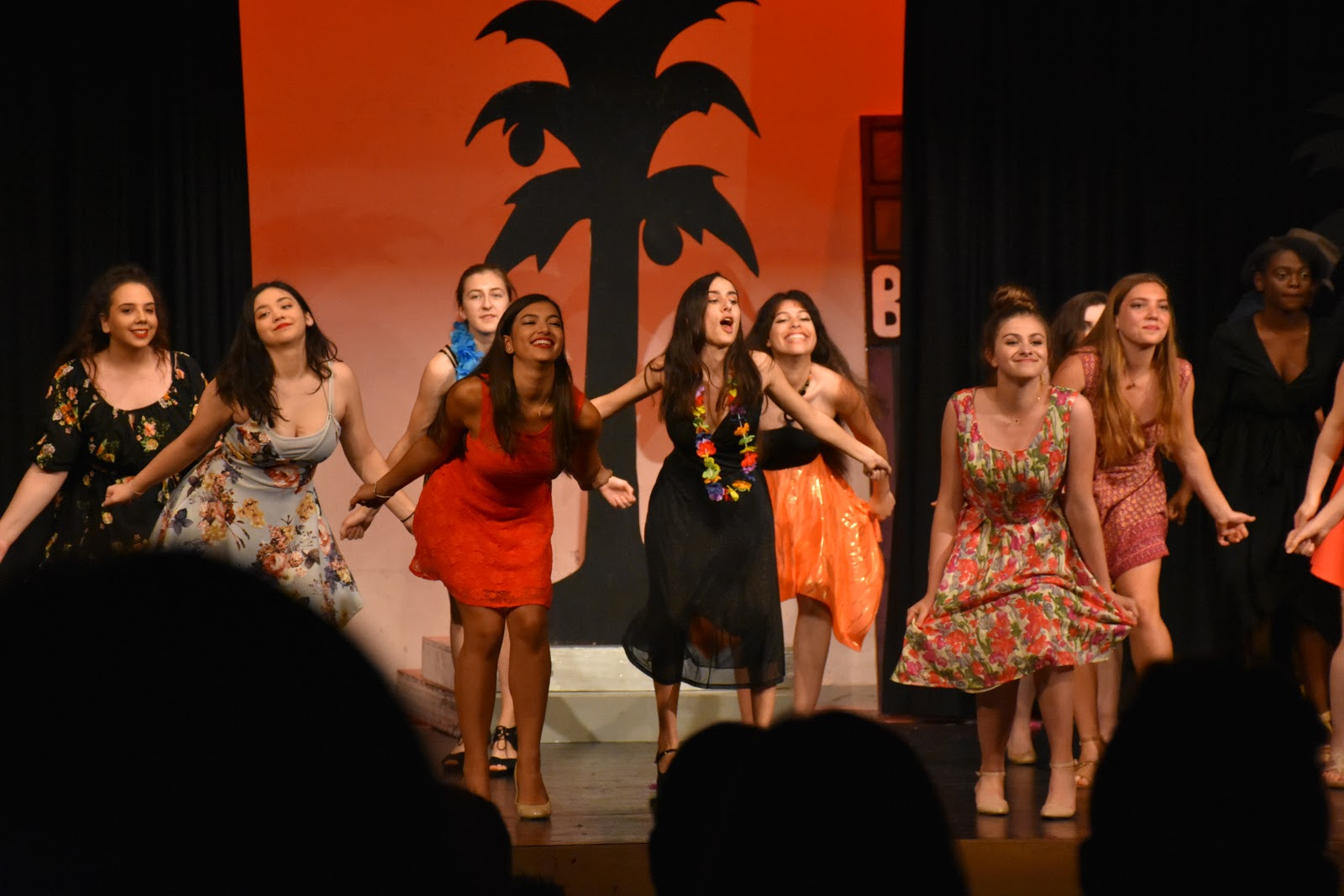
HT's adaptation of Charles Dickens' "A Christmas Carol"

In 2018, the school put on an adaptation of Charles Dickens' "A Christmas Carol"

Trinity Live Arts produces one annual school production, directed and choreographed by the teachers from all sections of the Arts Department. Past shows include: Fame (2004), Dracula (2005), Kids Say The Darndest Things (2006), Footloose (2007), The Donnellys (2008), The Wiz (2009) & Metamorphoses (2010).

2008 marked the first year the school participated in the Sears Drama Festival (held at Burlington Central High School). In 2009, Holy Trinity hosted the festival as "Red Carpet Nights". Past Sears Drama shows include: No Exit (2008), Inspector Rex (2009) & the original Bollywood musical, Bombay the Hard Way (2010).

The After-School Drama Club was introduced in 2009, allowing students to be both directors and actors in their own productions.

Once a year the school holds a challenge for all students who seek to get into filmmaking. The Five Hour film challenge takes place once a year. A team of five students must create a short film in under five hours with a specific line depending on whatever our STAR (Student. Teacher. Arts. Representatives) council chooses it to be. Students must pay fifteen dollars that covers, a bus to and from downtown oakville, and a pizza lunch. The winning team will all be awarded medals and their names inscribed on a plaque in the school.

Every year, Holy Trinity's S.T.A.R council holds a Christmas Assembly in the GymThe assembly usually involves games, fun video clips put together by the S.T.A.R (Student. Teacher. Arts. Representatives) members, and sometimes dance routines and/or skits.

== Feeder schools ==
Elementary school graduates who are in the boundaries of Holy Trinity and will attend Holy Trinity High School starting in the next school year include Our Lady of Peace, St.Marguerite D'Youville, St. Andrews, St.John of Oakville, and St. Michael's, and Holy Family.

Holy Trinity Catholic Secondary School hosts athletic tournaments throughout the school year for their feeder schools including volleyball, basketball, track and field all day tournaments. Holy Trinity not only holds events for just the feeder schools, they also host tournaments of a variety of sports for their fellow Halton Region high schools. In addition, the arts program at Holy Trinity welcomes their feeder schools to their shows to inform coming students of the opportunities that the arts program holds.

== Notable alumni ==
- Ignas Brazdeikis, NBA player
- Eric Cerantola, MLB player
- Declan Cross, CFL player
- Scott Laughton, NHL player
- Briar Nolet, Dancer and Actress
- Nathan Rourke, NFL player
- Kurtis Rourke, NFL player
- Jake Manley, Actor

== See also ==
- Education in Ontario
- List of secondary schools in Ontario
