= Notre Dame Catholic Secondary School (Burlington) =

Location
- 2333 Headon Forest Drive; Burlington, Ontario, L7M 3X6; Canada; 43.37784°N 79.83076°W

Information
- School type: Secondary School
- Motto: "Fear the Irish!"
- Religious affiliation: Catholicism
- Founded: 1989
- School board: Halton Catholic District School Board
- Superintendent: Lorrie Naar
- Principal: Mark Freeman
- Grades: Grades 9 to 12, optional additional Grade 12+
- Enrolment: 1,200 (2023–2024)
- Language: English & Extended French
- Area: Headon Forest, North Burlington
- Colours: Navy Blue, Gold and Green
- Mascot: Duelling Leprechaun
- Team name: Fightin' Irish
- Website: ntdm.hcdsb.org

Notre Dame Catholic Secondary School is a coeducational Catholic high school in Burlington, Ontario Canada. It was founded in 1989 by the Halton Catholic District School Board and enrolls students from the 9th to 12th grades. However, many grade 12 graduates return for an optional 5th year of secondary school.

== Governance ==
The school is administered by the Halton Catholic District School Board and falls within the jurisdiction of the Diocese of Hamilton. Oversight is provided by the board’s superintendent and the school principal, with support from an elected Catholic School Council.

There are currently 70+ full-time teachers and 100+ total staff employed at Notre Dame. There are 10 Department Heads who serve on Academic Council.

== Admissions ==
Notre Dame's enrolment has experienced a renewal since September 2017, increasing in size from the mid 900s to just over 1,200 students in 2023–2024. It receives most of its students from local elementary schools including St. Gabriel, St. Timothy, St. Mark, and Canadian Martyrs.

Notre Dame, like all publicly funded Catholic schools in Ontario, also accepts non-Catholics into the school; however, they are expected to take part in the religious activities and religious classes.

== Curriculum ==
Notre Dame is home to Extended French and 6 Specialist High Skills Major (SHSM) programs in Health Sciences, Business Leadership, Green Industries, Computer Engineering, Culinary Arts, and Manufacturing. It is also a hub for STEAM (Science, Technology, Engineering, Arts, and Mathematics). Its students compete annually in mock trials, model UN, School REACH, Euclid Math, Halton Skills, and many more local and provincial academic events. Notre Dame promotes and supports all post-secondary pathways—university, college, apprenticeship, and workplace.

The school community hosts an annual Arts Night, School Play, Business Leadership Conference, and most recently a STEAM Conference. There are plenty of clubs and activities for students to participate in as well as Student Council, Irish Leads, Physical Education Leadership, Business Leadership, and STEAM sponsored events. Students are also supported academically with after-school math help, a literacy course to assist with preparations for the OSSLT (Ontario Secondary School Literacy Test), credit rescue, and the L2L (Licence to Learn) student, peer tutoring initiative.

=== Academics ===
Notre Dame has a wide array of courses in many different areas of interest. Students with a 79.5 percent overall average or above are recognized by being placed on the school's Honour Roll.

== Athletics ==
Notre Dame competes in the Halton Catholic Athletic Association (HCAA). The HCAA is 1 of 3 athletic associations under the Golden Horseshoe Athletic Conference (GHAC), which in turn is itself 1 of 18 regional associations under the Ontario Federation of School Athletic Associations (OFSAA).

Over the past several years, a few teams have placed in the top three at OFSAA (the Ontario Provincial Championships), including the cross-country team, field hockey team, varsity girls' ice hockey team, swim team, and girls' soccer team, lacrosse team, girls' rugby team, and track and field team. The girls' basketball team were OFSAA champions in 2016 and bronze medalists in 2017. The girls soccer team were OFSAA champions in 2019.

The 2019–20 school year continued to build upon the school's athletic resurgence with HCAA championship victories in senior field hockey, junior football, boys and girls swim teams and varsity girls' hockey team. The girls varsity hockey team are also GHAC champions, moving onto OFSAA. The swim team left OFSAA with 1 gold and 1 silver medal.

There is an annual athletic banquet held in mid June which honours the MVPs and best athletes of the year from every sport and grade. Approximately 500 students, parents and staff attend the event, which is well known throughout the school for its video montage commemorating the year's athletic achievements.

Notre Dame also offers the annual March Madness Basketball Camp and Summer Sports Camp (July) for elementary aged students, grades 1–8. The camps are open to students in both the Catholic and Public school systems.

Sports Offered at Notre Dame
Fall Sports	Winter Sports	Spring Sports
Basketball (Girls)	Basketball (Boys)	Baseball
Volleyball (Boys)	Volleyball (Girls)	Lacrosse
Field Hockey	Ice Hockey	Soccer
Football	Swimming	Rugby
Cross Country	Badminton	Track & Field
Golf	Skiing/Snowboarding	Softball
	Touch Football (Girls)	Ultimate (Frisbee)
		Cricket

== Former principals ==
- Peter Visser, Principal, 1987–1997
- Art Kelly, Principal, 1997–1998
- Paul Thompson, Principal, 1998–2005
- Stanley Gajewski, Principal, 2005–2008
- Thomas Dunn, Principal, 2008–2010
- Michael Iannetta, Principal 2010–2013
- Cairine MacDonald, Principal 2013–2017
- Anthony Cordeiro, Principal 2017–2020
- Norman Roberts, Principal 2020–2024
- Mark Freeman, Principal As of 2024

== Notable alumni ==
- Owen Caissie professional baseball player

== See also ==
- Education in Ontario
- List of secondary schools in Ontario
