= Christ the King Catholic Secondary School =

- Excellence, Faith, Courage

Location
- 161 Guelph Street; Halton Region; Georgetown, Ontario L7G 4A1; Canada

Information
- School type: Public Catholic Secondary School
- Motto: Equity, Dignity, and Respect
- Religious affiliation: Catholic
- Opened: 2002
- School board: Halton Catholic School Board
- School district: Halton Catholic District
- Superintendent: Anthony Cordeiro
- Area trustee: Janet O'Hearn-Czarnota
- School number: 697125
- Principal: Lisa Vasile
- Principal: Anthony Marcellino
- Principal: Melissa Moore
- Director of Education: John Klein
- Chaplain: Jordyn Tower
- Grades: 9, 10, 11, and 12
- Age: 13 to 19
- Average class size: 25
- Hours in school day: 7
- Campus: Suburban
- Colours: Blue, Silver, and Green
- Mascot: "Jake the Jag"
- Nickname: "CtK"
- Team name: "The Jaguars"
- Rival: GDHS 87's
- OSSLT average: 82% of students were successful, March 2021
- Feeder schools: Holy Cross, St. Brigid, St. Catherine of Alexandria, St. Francis of Assisi, St. Joseph's
- Website: secondary.hcdsb.org/ctk

Christ the King, often referred to as CtK, is a Catholic secondary school in Georgetown, Ontario, Canada. The school was established and began classes in September 2002. Its students are required to wear school uniforms. The school competes in the Golden Horseshoe Halton Sports Division, and their teams are known as the Jaguars. The Jaguars developed a rivalry with the Georgetown District High School 87's (GDHS). CtK began specialist high skills major programs in the arts, physical education and information technology in 2009.

== Facilities ==
Christ the King features:

- Vocal and instrumental Music rooms
- Dance studio
- Dramatic Arts Studio
- A 350-seat theatre
- Weight room
- Artificial turf field and track
- Three connected gymnasiums
- Food & nutrition room
- Cosmetology Lab
- Automotive Shop
- Construction Technology
- Advanced Placement (AP) classes

== Arts program ==
Christ the King as a secondary school is known for its arts program, starting its Specialist High Skills Major Arts Program in 2009. Classes include visual, musical (vocal & instrumental), dramatic arts (including dance), as well as musical theatre. Christ the King has also put on a number of theatrical productions. In more recent years CtK has chosen musicals such as Annie, Grease, and Little Shop rather than plays.

| Year | Musical |
|---|---|
| 2004 | Joseph and the Amazing Technicolor Dreamcoat |
| 2005 | You're a Good Man, Charlie Brown |
| 2006 | Grease |
| 2007 | Seussical |
| 2008 | Footloose |
| 2009 | N/A |
| 2010 | Annie |
| 2011 | Little Shop of Horrors |
| 2012 | Beauty and the Beast |
| 2013 | 13 |
| 2014 | N/A |
| 2015 | Grease |
| 2016 | Godspell |
| 2017 | Into the Woods |
| 2018 | The Sound of Music |
| 2019 | All Shook Up |
| 2020 | N/A |
| 2021 | N/A |
| 2022 | High School Musical: On Stage |
| 2023 | We Will Rock You |
| 2024 | Mean Girls |
| 2025 | N/A |
| 2026 | Freaky Friday |

The Irene McCauley Theatre for the Performing Arts

The Irene McCauley Theatre is where CtK's theatrical productions are held. Christ the King was built with a live performance theatre consisting of approximately 350 seats, although seats can be removed or added to meet a productions' needs. In 2007, the theatre's name was changed in honour of Irene McCauley, a former trustee of the Halton Catholic District School Board, at which she worked for 26 years.

== Confessions incident ==
During 2023 an instagram account was created called "ctk_confessions2024", which would later be used in 2024, this account was used for students to make "Confessions" about other incidents and love interests, it caused many parents to get upset that their children were mentioned on this account and the people who participated and created "ctk_confessions2024" were penalized according to eyewitnesses.

== Feeder schools ==
- Holy Cross
- St. Brigid
- St. Catherine of Alexandria
- St. Francis of Assisi
- St. Joseph's
- Halton Hills Christian School
- Sacre-Coeur

== Notable alumni ==
- Jason Dickinson (born 1995), Canadian ice hockey player
- MacKenzie Entwistle (born 1999), Canadian ice hockey player
- Sarah Fillier (born 2000), Canadian ice hockey player

== See also ==
- Education in Ontario
- List of secondary schools in Ontario
- Georgetown District High School
