= Cook-off =

Cooking competition

A cook-off is a cooking competition where the contestants each prepare dishes for judging either by a select group of judges or by the general public. Cook-offs are very popular among competitors (such as restaurants) with very similar dishes, such as chili, and serves as a way to decide which recipe is the best for that particular dish.

== Chili cook-off ==
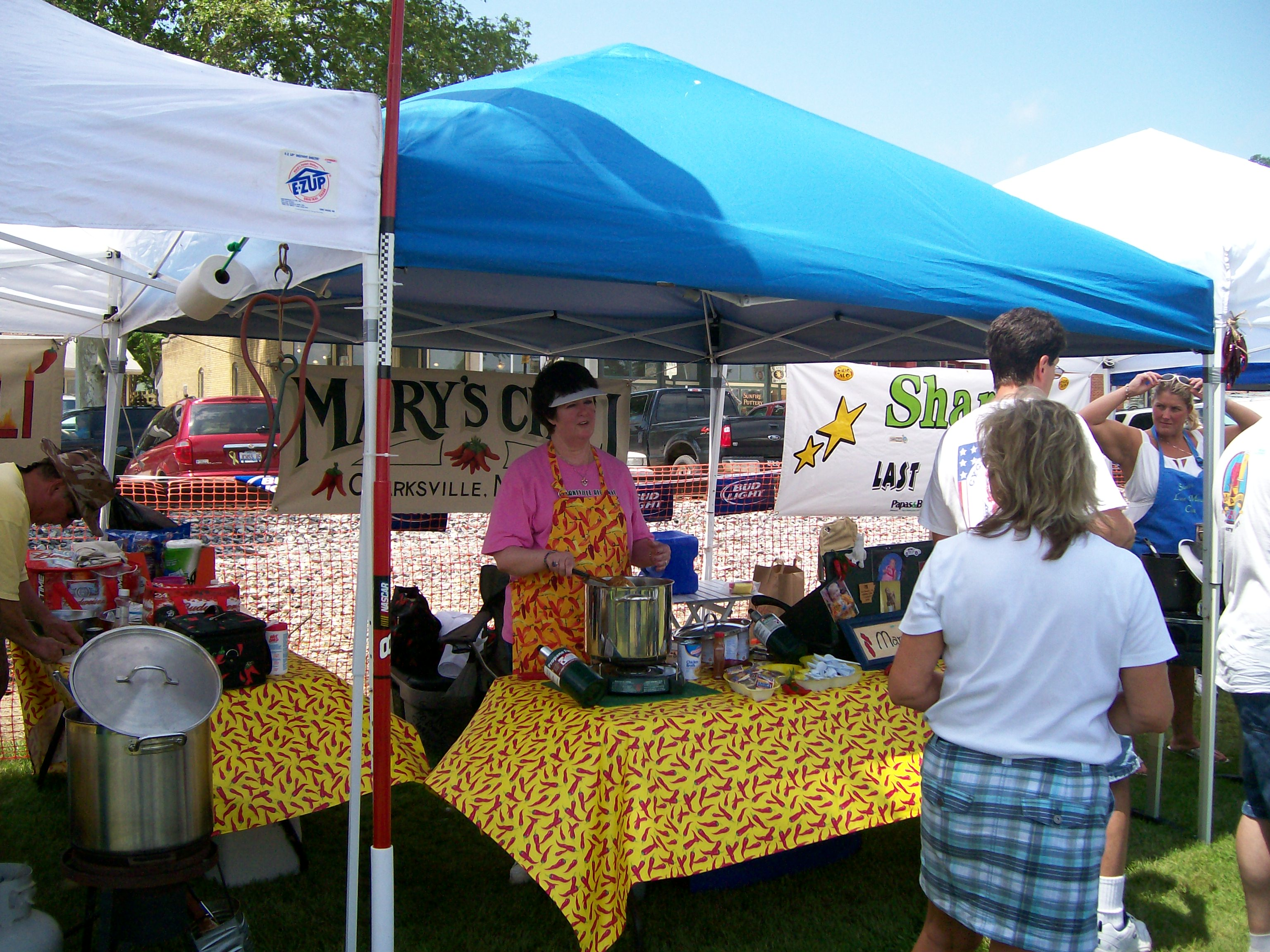
Clarksville, Missouri chili cook-off in 2008

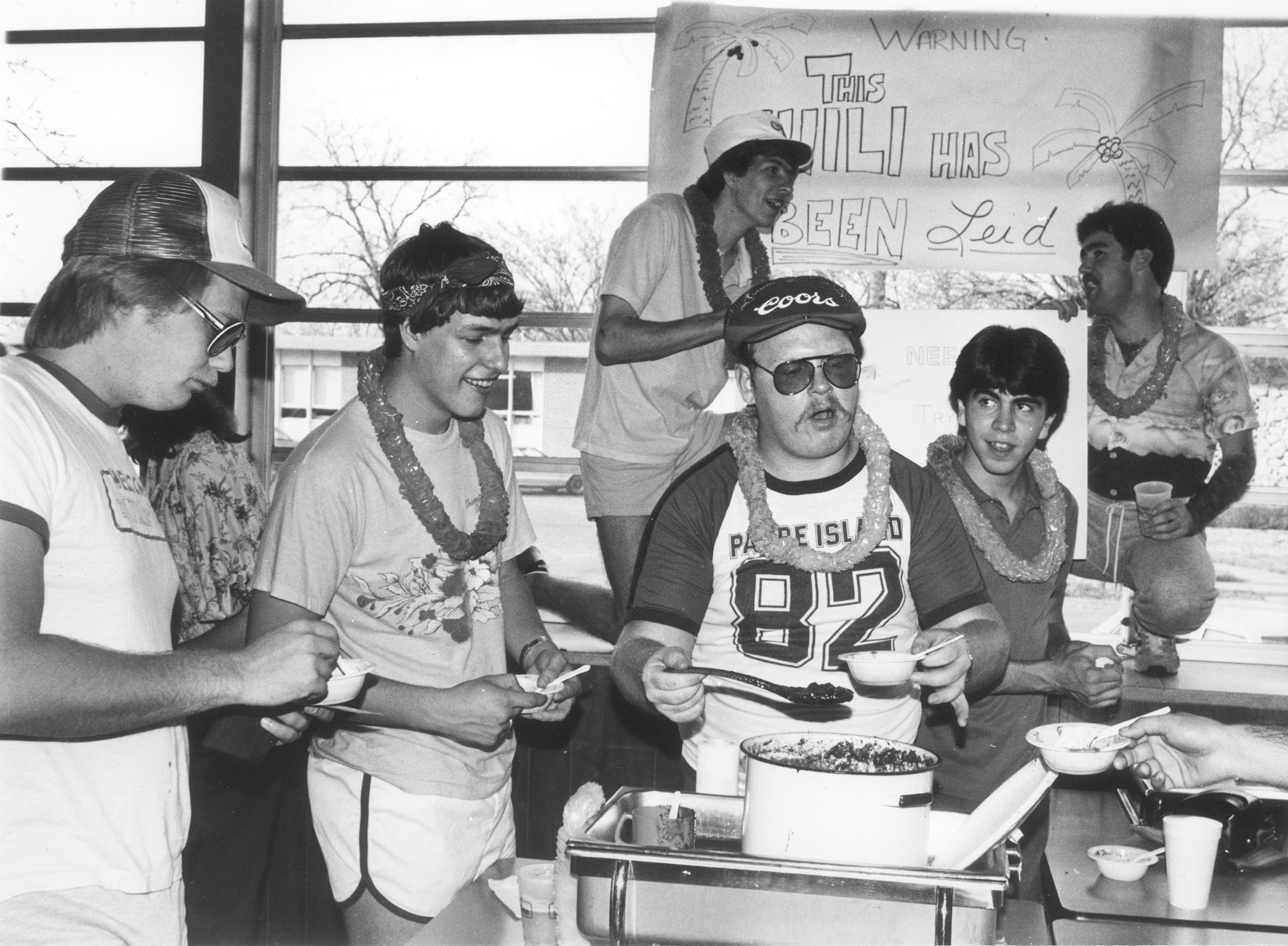
Engineering students at chili cook-off, University of Texas at Arlington, 1983

A chili cook-off is a social event, similar to a barbecue, in which competitors prepare their own particular recipe for chili con carne and submit it for taste testing. A cook-off may be an informal gathering with the simple goal of sharing recipes and enjoying food, or it may be a large-scale event with a panel of judges and prizes for winners.

The Chili Appreciation Society International (CASI) sanctions over 550 cook-offs annually that raise over $1,000,000 for charity. Corporate CASI, which sanctions cook-offs, tabulates cookoff results, and puts on the annual Terlingua International Chili Championship, has an annual income of approximately $250,000. Out of this annual income around $60,000 goes to charity. The CASI is a 501(c)(3) corporation.

The International Chili Society (ICS) organizes chili cook-offs as fundraisers. Its annual cook-offs are on a grand scale, with regional qualifying events that attract tens of thousands of participants and a "World Championship" cook-off held in October. The ICS has raised millions of dollars for charity while still awarding hundreds of thousands of dollars to winners.

As early as 1970, many communities have hosted non-ICS cook-offs, leading to a competing "World Championship" cook-off in Terlingua, Texas.

The UK Chilli Cook-off Association organises chilli cook-offs as throughout the UK as fundraisers, culminating in the UK grand final at the Upton Cheyney Chili Festival near Bath, UK – Winners qualify for the World Food Championships Chili Cookoff

Many chili cook-offs were either canceled or moved to virtual events because of the COVID-19 pandemic, from 2020 to 2021.

=== Notable chili cook-offs ===
- Chilympiad in San Marcos, Texas (1970–2002)
- Lone Star Chili Cook-off in New York City
- 2024 Chili Cookoff Team Generations - Undefeated Champs in Troy

== Ribfest ==
A ribfest is a cook-off typically for pork ribs.

=== Notable ribfests ===
- Canada's Largest Ribfest – Burlington, Ontario
- Best in the West Nugget Rib Cook-off – Sparks, Nevada
- London Ribfest – London, Ontario
- Toronto Ribfest – Etobicoke, Toronto, Ontario, Canada
- Canada's largest Halal Barbeque and Fast Food Truck Festival, Toronto, Ontario

== See also ==
- The Great British Bake Off, a British television cooking competition series
- First Lady Bake-Off
- "El Viaje Misterioso de Nuestro Jomer (The Mysterious Voyage of Homer)," an episode of The Simpsons in which a chili cook-off is a major plot point
