= Brant Street Pier =

Attraction in Burlington, Ontario, Canada

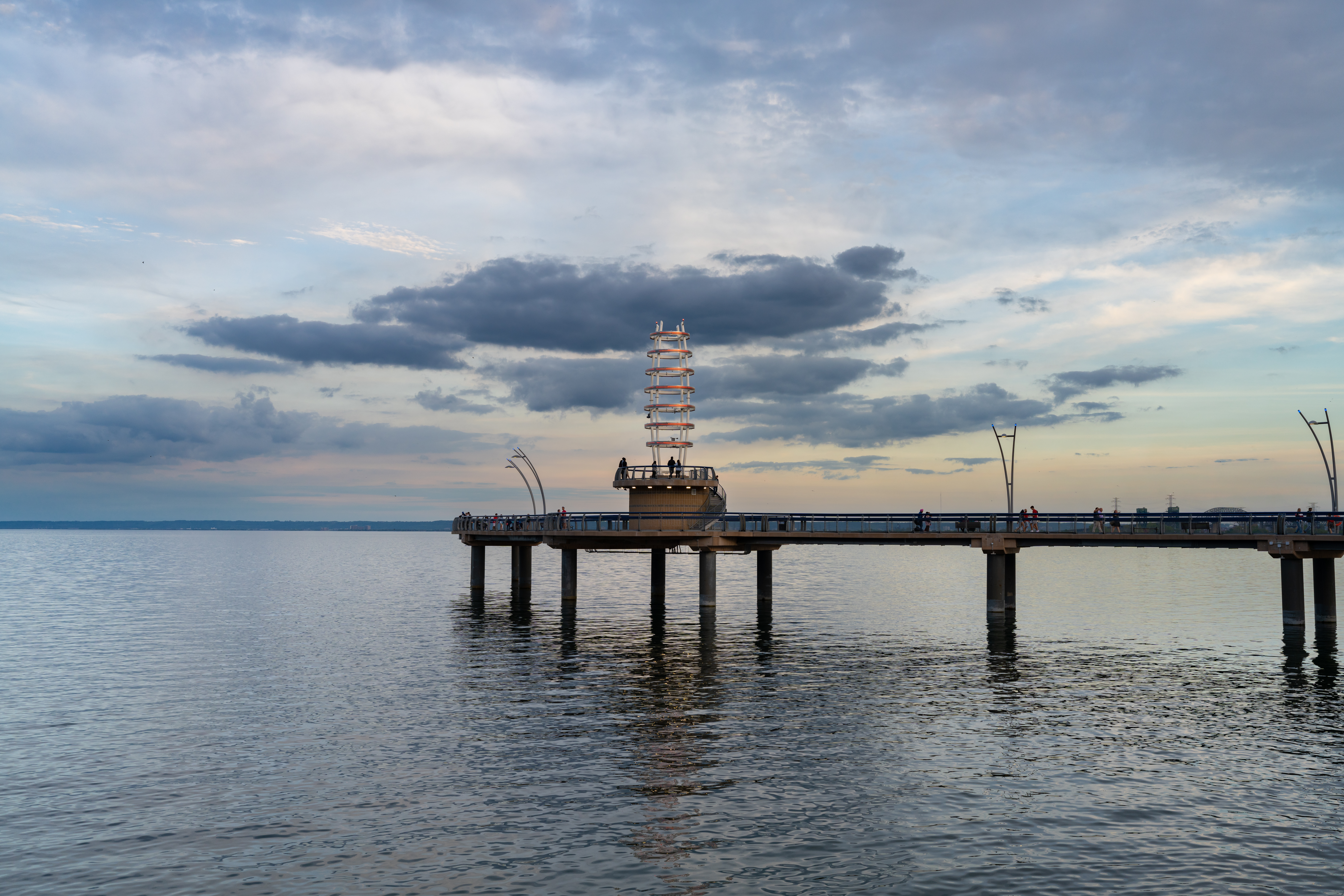
- View of the pier from Spencer Smith Park
- Type: Attraction
- Spans: Lake Ontario
- Location: Burlington, Ontario
- Coordinates: 43°19′23″N 79°47′39″W

Characteristics
- Total length: 137 m (449 ft)
- Width: 7.5 m (25 ft)

History
- Opening date: June 16, 2013 (13 years ago)

The Brant Street Pier is an attraction located in Spencer Smith Park at the waterfront of Downtown Burlington, Ontario, Canada. It extends 137 metres into Lake Ontario and provides views of the lake and Burlington's shoreline. It officially opened during the Sound of Music Festival in Spencer Smith Park on the Father's Day weekend of June 2013.

The pier is the final phase of the Downtown Waterfront Project: expansion of the Art Gallery of Burlington, construction of the 380-vehicle Locust Street parking facility, and opening of Discovery Landing.

== Construction ==
The construction of the pier began on 2006 with a budget of $6.9 million. After a series of delays and issues, the pier opened in June 2013. A well-known philanthropist, who was going to donate a $10 million sculpture Untitled (Head Through Belly), pulled out of the deal after opposition from locals. Construction of the pier was paused in the summer of 2008 because a crane fell into Lake Ontario. Later, the majority of the pier's reinforcement beams had to be fixed because they were found to be lacking in foundation. In 2012, Burlington City Council decided to remove a large wind turbine from the structure. The original plan for the pier was supposed to be 100 meters longer than what was constructed. The city settled their legal disputes in 2014 with the original contractor, Harm Schilthuis and Sons Ltd., and engineering firm Aecom Canada Ltd. Final costs to the city were estimated at $14.4M.

== Features ==
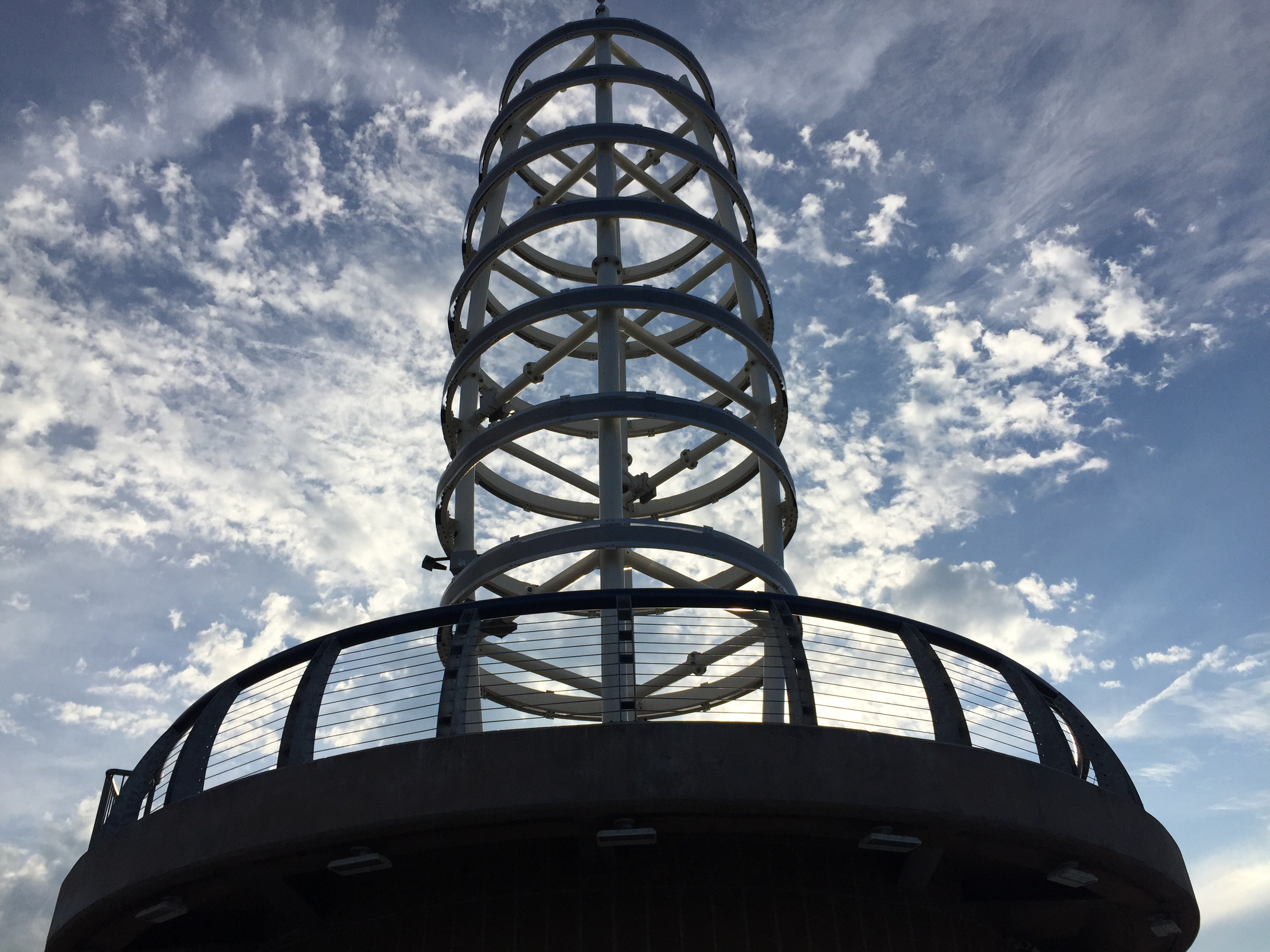
A 12-metre beacon made of tubular structural steel framing located on the centre of the raised platform.

The S-shaped pier is 137 metres long and about 7.5 metres wide along the span or deck. It features a walkway and lighted lookout tower elevated four meters above the deck. The lookout tower or the raised platform, accessible by a circular staircase, is located on the fifth span of the deck (a circular node with a diameter of 20m). This raised platform also supports a 12-metre beacon made of tubular structural steel framing on the centre.

The pier, as part of Spencer Smith Park, is open between 7 a.m. and 11 p.m. The pier is not maintained during winter. There is no docking feature yet on the pier; although Burlington City Council is intending to add one on later dates. Fishing and biking are allowed on the pier and park. Climbing, diving or swimming is not permitted on the pier, as well as skateboarding on benches and rails. Alcoholic beverages are not allowed on the pier.

The maximum number of people safely permitted on the pier is 2,100.

=== Lasting Impressions: Handprints on the Pier ===
In October 2012, the city opened an opportunity for children across Burlington to leave their hand prints on the pier. The city received 444 entries, drawing one name from each of the six wards and a seventh name from the city at large. The city then took the hand print impressions of the seven children as part of leaving their legacy with the Brant Street Pier. The children returned to help unveil the plaque that contains the lasting impressions of their handprints on the opening ceremony held last June 2013.

== Gallery ==
Brant Street Pier
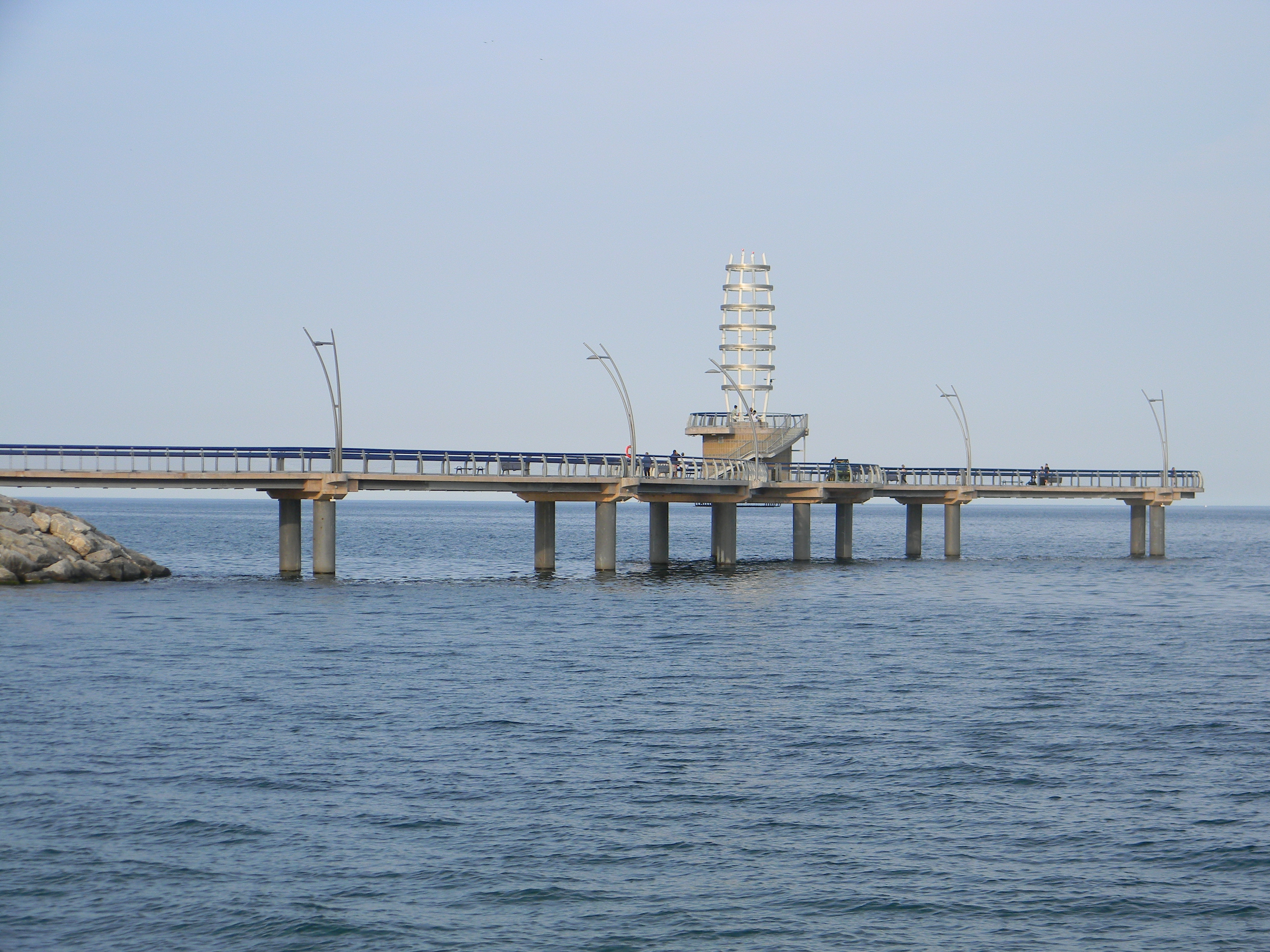
View of the pier from Spencer Smith Park

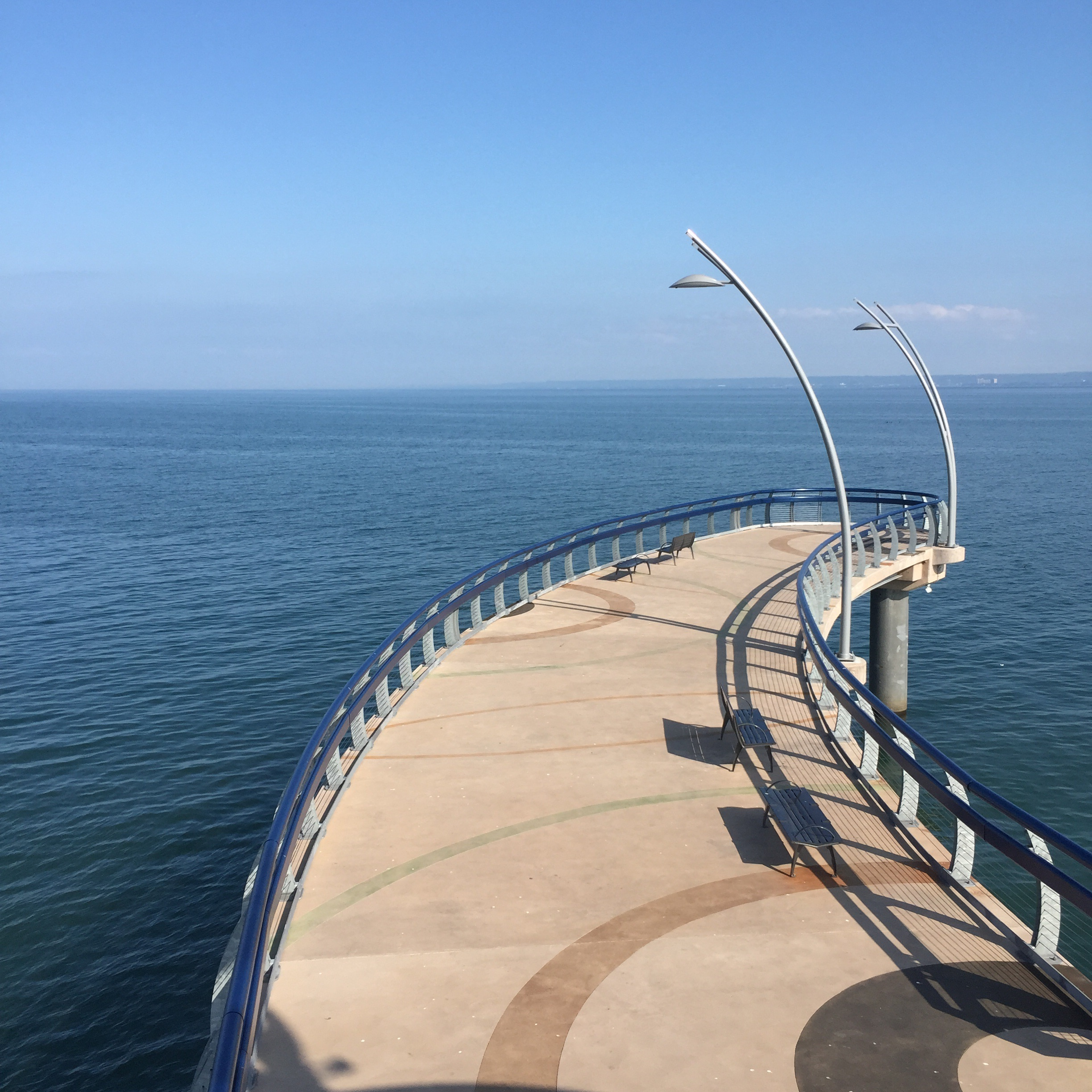
The end part of the pier overlooking Lake Ontario

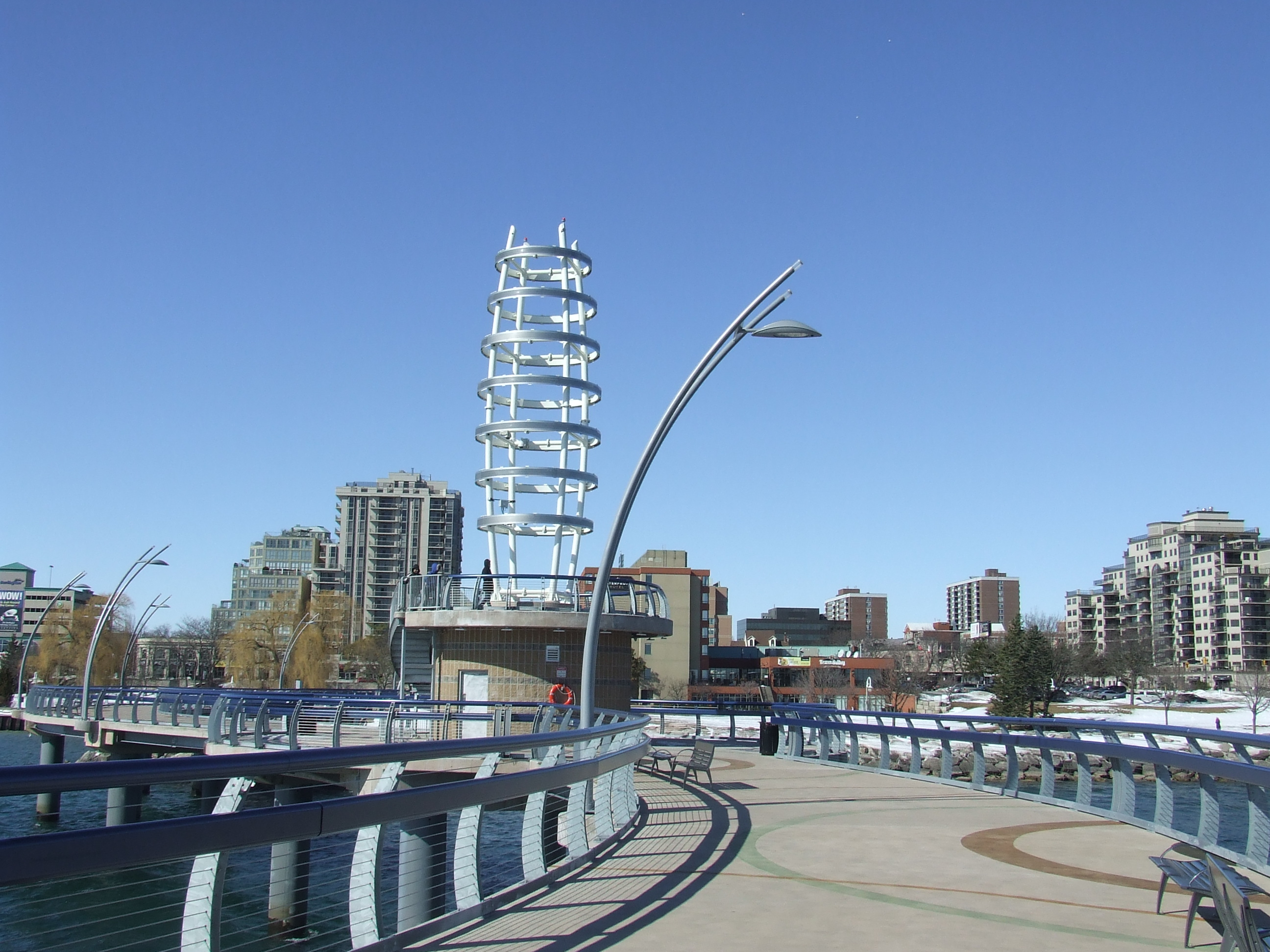
Downtown Burlington on the background

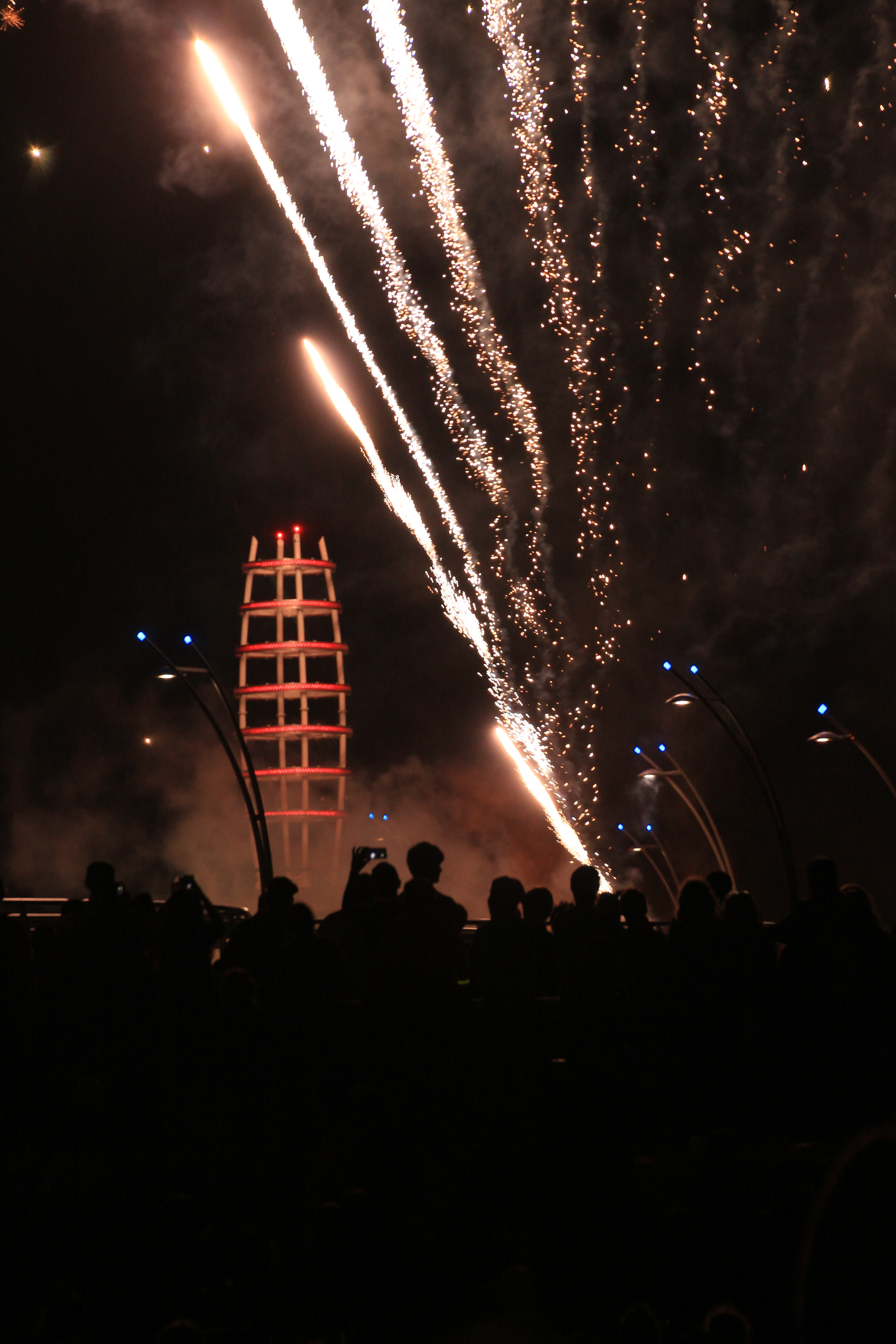
Brant Street Pier on Canada Day

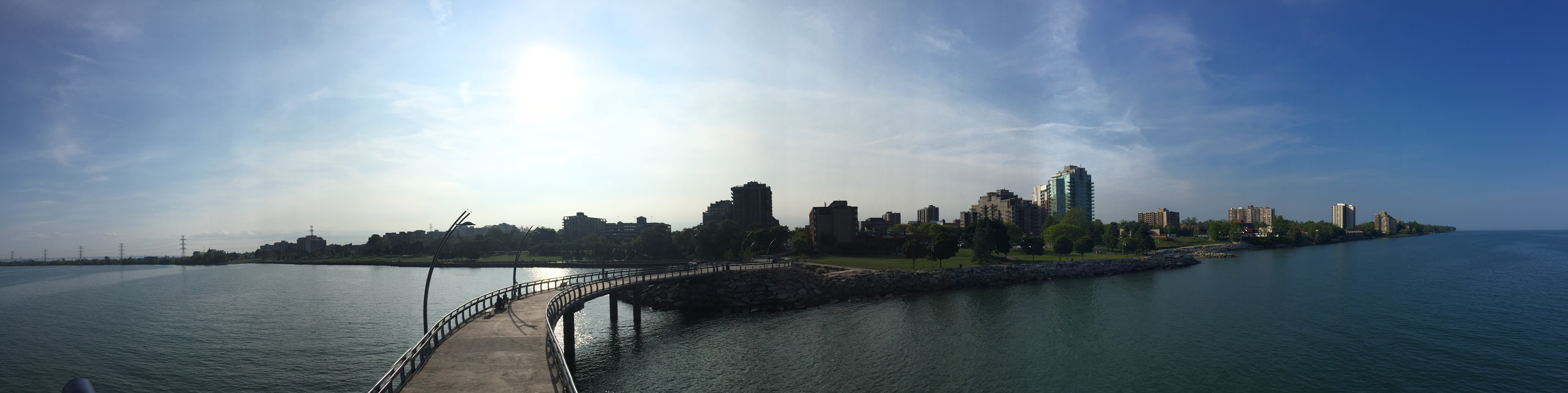
Downtown Burlington as seen from the circular raised platform.
