= Walter Hickling =

Canadian artist (1924–2011)

Walter Robert Hickling
- Born: 1 March 1924; Delhi, Ontario
- Died: 27 June 2011 (aged 87); Burlington, Ontario
- Education: Ontario College of Art
- Style: Figurative abstract artist

Walter Robert Hickling (1 March 1924 – 27 June 2011) was a Canadian artist, poet, composer and educator. Hickling was a graduate of the Ontario College of Art, an active member of local and regional art clubs, and a founding member of Hamilton Artists Inc.

== Early life ==
Walter Robert Hickling was born in Delhi, Ontario in 1924, to Samuel and Pearl Hickling. He studied at the University of Ontario College of Art under Carl Schaeffer, George Pepper, John Alfsen, William Ogilvie and Jock MacDonald graduating with a first class honours in drawing and painting in 1949. Initially after graduating Hickling concentrated his efforts on writing and composing music. In the early 1950s Hickling spent some time travelling and studying in France and Spain which influenced his colour palette and loosened his brushstrokes as he developed a figurative abstract style. Hickling was the assistant art editor of Liberty Magazine from 1949 until 1951.

== Career ==
Upon his return to Canada Hickling settled in Burlington, Ontario where he was to live for the remainder of his life. Hickling was an art master who taught at numerous schools throughout the region, including St. Catharine's, Brantford, Burlington, Guelph, and Hamilton. He also offered classes at Burlington Arts Centre, and for twenty-five years he taught at Dundas Valley School of Art.

Hickling exhibited widely across the region and the country, preferring to show in non-commercial and public gallery spaces. He had little interest in selling his art. In the 1940s nudes and other figure studies dominated his work. His work throughout the 1950s and 1960s was more experimental and imbued with a colour palette borrowed from Fauvism. In the 1970s and 1980s he became an en plein air painter concentrating on landscapes, where in he meticulously noted the locations, dates and other details on the back of his canvases.

Hickling showed in numerous group shows throughout his life and was an active participant on the local arts scene. He debuted at the Royal Canadian Academy in his graduation year and did not show there again until 1966. He showed at the same venue in 1968. He exhibited intermittently with the Ontario Society of Artists where he first showed in 1954 with Still Life: Gourd and Citrus. He participated in the 1955 15th Annual Western Ontario Artists Exhibition alongside Tony Urquhart. In the autumn of 1957 Hickling had a joint show with Jean and Dennis Osborne at the Art Gallery of Hamilton. Hickling was one of the few abstract artists to sit on the selection committee for the Art Gallery of Hamilton's annual show in 1960. In 1962 the Glenhyrst Arts Council in Brantwood, Ontario offered a solo exhibition of Hickling paintings. In 1965 Hickling held a one-man show at the Professional Arts Building in Hamilton. The Art Gallery of Hamilton hosted a solo exhibition of Hickling's work in November 1968. He showed four works at the Montreal Museum of Fine Art's Spring Exhibition in the same year, where he was to show infrequently thereafter.

In 1973 a fire destroyed the Burlington Arts Centre which housed Hickling's studio. Hickling was a founder member of Hamilton Artists Inc. in 1975, established as an exhibiting venue and to promote art production in the area. He retained his membership of the organisation for the remainder of his life. The Burlington Cultural Centre hosted a mid-career retrospective entitled Walter Hickling: 25 years in the autumn of 1980. The exhibition consisted of fifty-five works including forty-five from private collections. In 1991 Hickling's work was included in the Artists of Influence exhibition at Hamilton Artists Inc. Musician Valerie Nichol gave the first public performance of a Hickling piano sonata on the opening night.

Hickling was a skilled poet and musician. As part of the Guelph centennial celebrations Hickling contributed the cover art for the programme accompanying an oratorio entitled Angels of the Earth by Charles H Wilson when it was performed in Guelph and Hamilton in June 1967. In 1996 Violet Williams commissioned Hickling, Susan Lapp and Valerie Nichol to create recordings from Hicklings poems set to music. The poems came from Hicklings own sketch books and were set to music by the composer Robert Daigneault. Hickling acts as both poet and narrator on the recordings which came from live concerts and were released in 1998 under the title Ghosts Of Summer's Passing. Hickling cites influences from Schubert, Mahler, Ives, Debussy, Ravel and Shostakovich.

A few years before his death Hickling sold his house and moved into a residential home.

== Death and legacy ==
Walter Hickling died at the Joseph Brant Memorial Hospital on 27 June 2011 aged 87. He was unmarried and had no children. His contributions to the local community and the Arts were commemorated in a retrospective entitled Walter Hickling: a memory at Burlington Arts Centre in 2013.

His works can be found in many public and private collections including National Gallery of Canada, Canadian Museum of Contemporary Photography, Art Gallery of Ontario, Winnipeg Art Gallery, Art Gallery of Burlington and the Art Gallery of Hamilton.
