= The Offspring World Tour 2017 =

2017 concert tour by the Offspring

- World tour by The Offspring
- Start date: March 23, 2017
- End date: November 25, 2017
- Legs: 7

The Offspring concert chronology
- The Offspring World Tour 2016 (2016); The Offspring World Tour 2017 (2017); The Offspring World Tour 2018 (2018)

The Offspring World Tour 2017 was a concert tour by The Offspring, which began on March 23, 2017, in Nagoya, Japan and ended on November 25, 2017.

For the first time since he joined The Offspring in 1985, guitarist Noodles was absent from touring on the European summer 2017 dates, stating on Instagram that a "sudden family matter" forced him to stay in the U.S.A. Longtime live guitarist Todd Morse took his place as lead guitarist, while Sum 41 guitarist Tom Thacker played as second live guitarist.

To coincide with the 20th anniversary of its release, The Offspring played their fourth studio album Ixnay on the Hombre in its entirety during their appearance at Amnesia Rockfest.

== Tour dates ==
Date	City	Country	Event	Venue
Asia
March 23, 2017	Nagoya	Japan	-	Zepp Nagoya
March 25, 2017	Osaka	Japan	Punkspring	Kobe World
March 26, 2017	Tokyo	Japan	Punkspring	Makuhari Messe
Central America
March 31	Monterrey	Mexico	Pa'l Norte Music Fest	Fundidora Park
North America
April 1, 2017	Frisco	United States	Edgefest	Toyota Stadium
April 8, 2017	Dana Point	United States	Sabroso Festival	Doheny State Beach
April 13, 2017	Berkeley	United States	A Benefit for 924 Gilman	Cornerstone
April 15, 2017	Phoenix	United States	BRUFest	Fear Farm Festival Grounds
April 29, 2017	Jacksonville	United States	Welcome to Rockville	Metropolitan Park
April 30, 2017	Fort Myers	United States	Fort Rock	JetBlue Park at Fenway South
May 7, 2017	Charlotte	United States	Carolina Rebellion	Charlotte Motor Speedway
May 14, 2017	Somerset	United States	Northern Invasion	Somerset Amphitheater
May 20, 2017	Columbus	United States	Rock on the Range	Mapfre Stadium
May 27, 2017	San Antonio	United States	River City Rockfest	AT&T Center
May 28, 2017	Pryor Creek	United States	Rocklahoma	Catch the Fever Music Festival Grounds
June 10, 2017	Burlington	Canada	Sound of Music Festival	Spencer Smith Park
June 23, 2017	Montebello	Canada	Amnesia Rockfest	-
July 6, 2017	Spokane	United States	-	Northern Quest Resort & Casino
July 7, 2017	Abbotsford	Canada	-	Abbotsford Centre
July 8, 2017	Penticton	Canada	-	South Okanagan Events Centre
July 10, 2017	Calgary	Canada	-	Cowboys Stampede
July 11, 2017	Moose Jaw	Canada	-	Mosaic Place
July 12, 2017	Winnipeg	Canada	-	RBC Convention Centre
July 14, 2017	Greater Sudbury	Canada	-	Sudbury Arena
July 15, 2017	London	Canada	Rock the Park	Harris Park
Europe
July 27, 2017	Barolo	Italy	Collisioni Festival	Piazza Colbert
July 29, 2017	Gijón	Spain	-	Tsunami Xix
July 30, 2017	Gignac	France	Festival Ecaussysteme	-
August 2, 2017	Rome	Italy	Rock in Roma	Postepay Sound
August 4, 2017	Lignano Sabbiadoro	Italy	Sunset Festival	Stadio Comunale Teghil
August 5, 2017	Székesfehérvár	Hungary	Fezen Festival	-
August 7, 2017	Tolmin	Slovenia	Punk Rock Holiday	-
August 9, 2017	Lokeren	Belgium	Lokerse Feesten	-
August 11–13, 2017	Landerneau	France	Festival Fête du Bruit	-
August 15–17, 2017	Sankt Pölten	Austria	FM4 Frequency Festival	-
August 15–17, 2017	Übersee	Germany	Chiemsee Summer	Almfischer 11
August 17, 2017	Penthalaz	Switzerland	Venoge Festival	-
August 18–20, 2017	Leipzig	Germany	Highfield Festival	-
August 23, 2017	Prague	Czech Republic	-	Malá Sportovní Hala
August 25, 2017	Straszęcin	Poland	Czad Festiwal	Arena Park
August 27, 2017	Bucharest	Romania	Rock the City	Arenele Romane
North America
September 8, 2017	Chicago	United States	-	Huntington Bank Pavilion
September 9, 2017	Sterling Heights	United States	-	Lottery Amphitheatre
September 10, 2017	St. Louis	United States	Wayback Pointfest	Hollywood Casino Amphitheatre
September 12, 2017	Holmdel	United States	-	PNC Bank Arts Center
September 14, 2017	Philadelphia	United States	-	Festival Pier
September 15, 2017	Boston	United States	-	Leader Bank Pavilion
September 16, 2017	Wantagh	United States	-	Jones Beach Theater
September 19, 2017	Rogers	United States	-	Walmart Arkansas Music Pavilion
September 21, 2017	The Woodlands	United States	-	Cynthia Woods Mitchell Pavilion
September 22, 2017	Irving	United States	-	The Pavilion at Irving Music Factory
South America
September 24, 2017	Rio de Janeiro	Brazil	Rock in Rio	Barra Olympic Park
North America
September 26, 2017	Chula Vista	United States	-	Mattress Firm Amphitheatre
September 27, 2017	Mountain View	United States	-	Shoreline Amphitheatre
September 29, 2017	Las Vegas	United States	-	Downtown Las Vegas Events Center
September 30, 2017	Salt Lake City	United States	-	USANA Amphitheatre
October 27, 2017	Edmonton	Canada	The Bear's 25th Halloween Howler	Shaw Conference Centre

== Personnel ==
- Dexter Holland – lead vocals, rhythm and lead guitar
- Noodles – lead guitar, backing vocals (except on European dates)
- Greg K. – bass guitar, backing vocals
- Pete Parada – drums
- Todd Morse – lead guitar (on European dates), rhythm guitar, backing vocals
- Tom Thacker – rhythm guitar, backing vocals (on European dates)
- Jonah Nimoy – rhythm guitar, backing vocals (on European dates)
