= Ribfest =

Type of food festival that occurs throughout the United States and Canada

A ribfest (short for rib festival), sometimes called a rib cook-off, is a type of food festival that occurs throughout the United States and Canada.

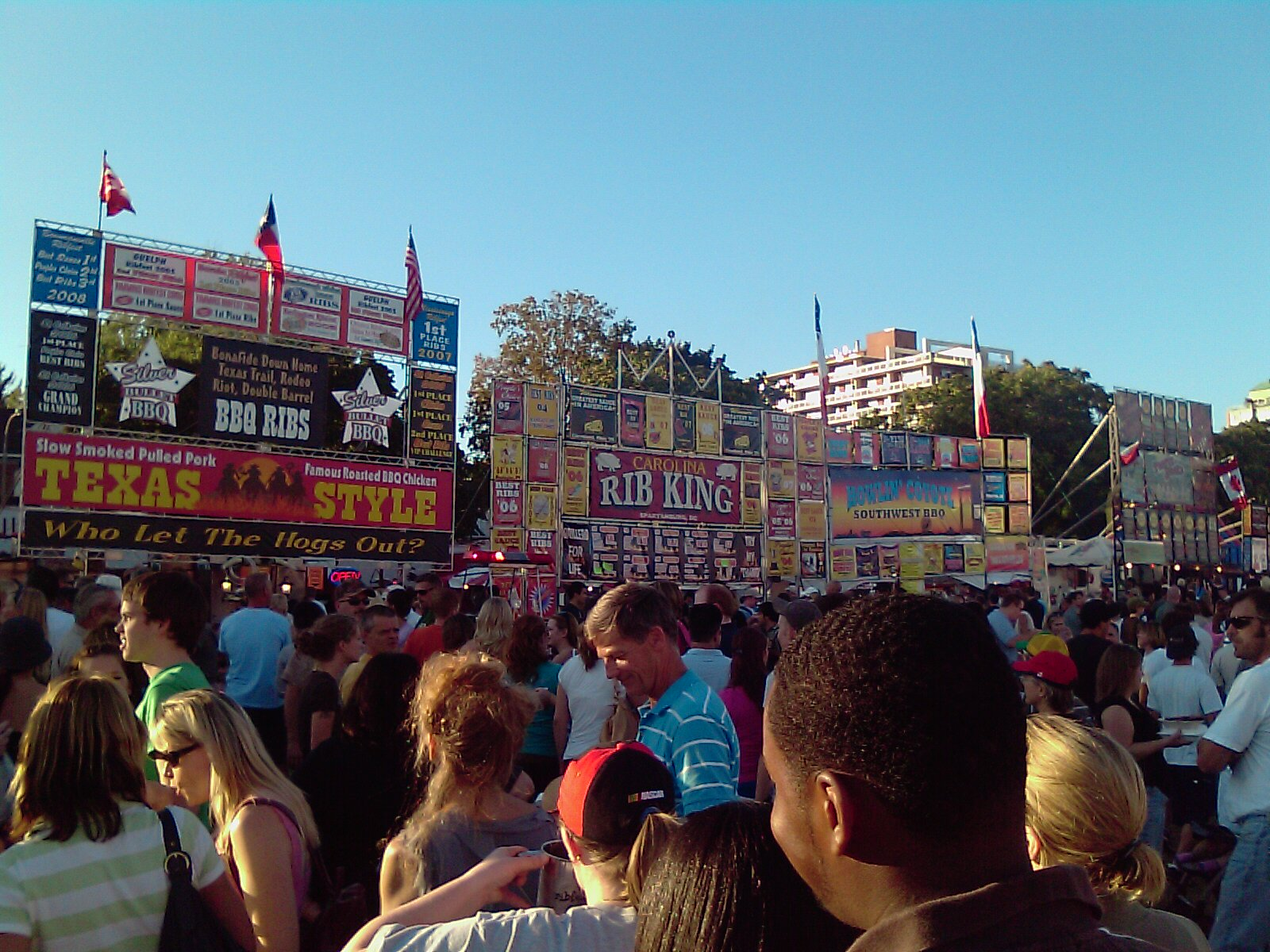
Ribfests typically attract large crowds

== Background ==
The size of each ribfest is often measured by the number of traveling professional "rib teams" which sell food and compete at the events.

A rib festival generally has multiple food vendors selling barbecue beef or pork ribs, pulled pork sandwiches, chicken, coleslaw, baked beans, and other related food choices. The vendors usually compete against one another for top spot in several categories including: Best Ribs, Best Sauce, Best Pulled Pork, and the Peoples Choice Award.

The rib festivals often coincide with music festivals, such as the "Dallas Ribfest Gospel BBQ", or Cleveland's "Great American Rib Cook-off & Music Festival".

After 30 years, Ribfest in St. Petersburg, Florida celebrated its final event in 2019. The festival raised nearly $4.5 million for local non-profits throughout the years. Dawson Creek, British Columbia held its first ribfest event in 2023.

== Notable ribfests ==
- Canada's Largest Ribfest – Burlington, Ontario
- Best in the West Nugget Rib Cook-off – Sparks, Nevada
- London Ribfest – London, Ontario
- Toronto Ribfest – Etobicoke, Toronto, Ontario, Canada
- Naperville Ribfest - Naperville, Illinois
- Canada's largest Halal Barbeque and Fast Food Truck Festival – Toronto, Ontario
- Ribfest Gaspésien - Gaspé, Quebec, Canada
