= Toronto Ribfest =

Annual ribfest in Etobicoke, Toronto, Ontario, Canada

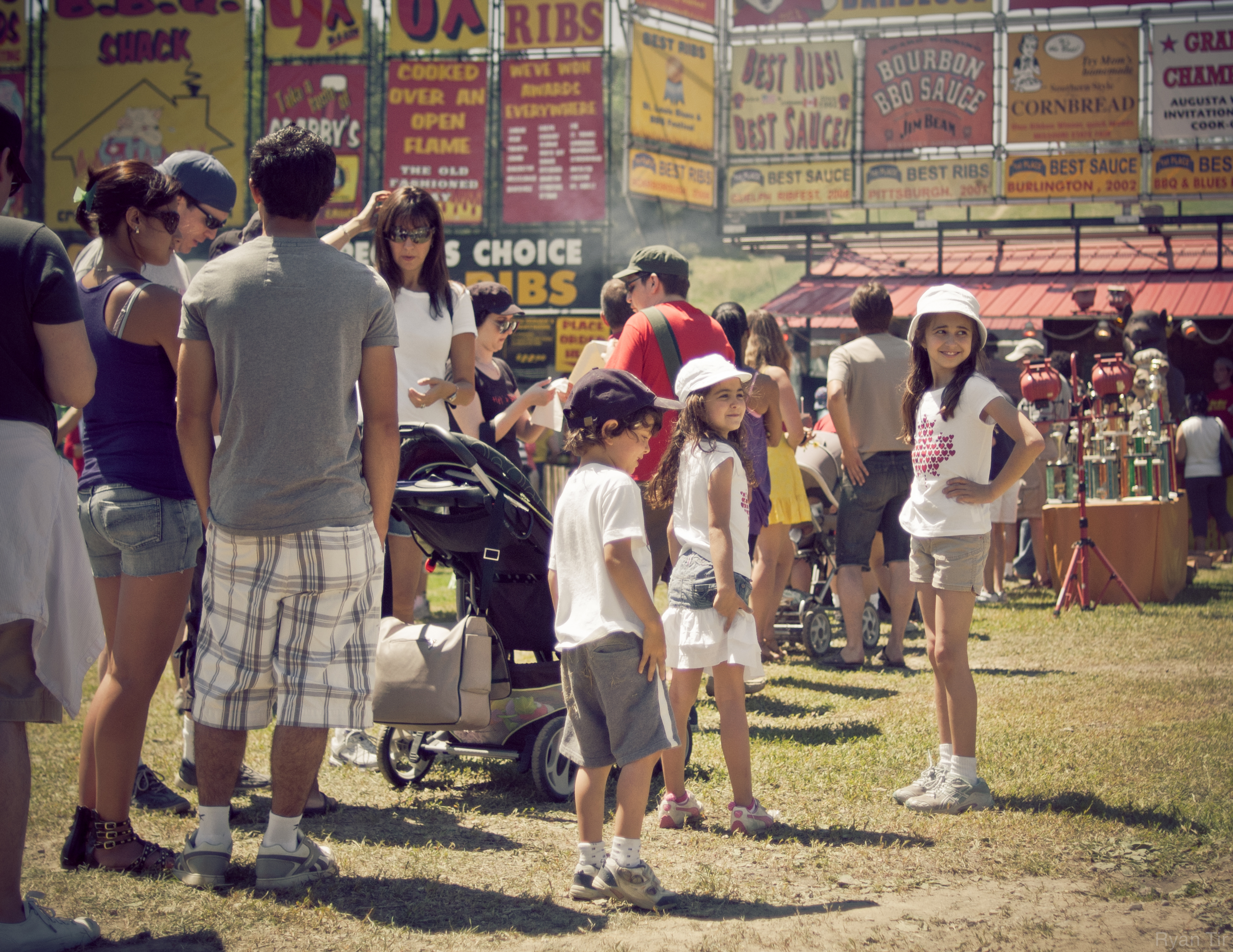
- Toronto Ribfest in Centennial Park, 2011
- Date: June
- Frequency: Annual
- Locations: Etobicoke, Toronto, Ontario, Canada
- Inaugurated: 1999
- Participants: 150,000
- Website: http://www.torontoribfest.com

Toronto Ribfest is an annual ribfest held at Cloverdale Mall (2026) in Etobicoke, Toronto, Ontario, Canada during the Canada Day weekend.

== Overview ==
The Toronto Ribfest is run by the Etobicoke Rotary Club. The festival is not for profit, volunteer run and gives all proceeds to charity. The festival takes place each year around the Canada Day weekend. The festival features rib vendors (which travel from all over North America), live music and beer for sale. The festival also includes many child friendly activities.

== History ==
The Toronto Ribfest was inaugurated in 1999. A drive-thru only event happened in 2020 and 2021 due to the COVID-19 pandemic in Toronto.

== See also ==
- London Ribfest
- Canada's Largest Ribfest
