= Canada's Largest Ribfest =

Annual food festival in Burlington, Ontario, Canada

Coordinates: 43.3218°N 79.7982°W

- The logo of Canada's Largest Ribfest
- Begins: 06 September 2021
- Frequency: Annual
- Locations: Spencer Smith Park, Burlington, Ontario, Canada
- Inaugurated: 1996
- Participants: approx. 175,000
- Website: http://www.canadaslargestribfest.com/

Canada's Largest Ribfest is the name of an annual ribfest food festival held in Spencer Smith Park by the lake shore in Burlington, Ontario. The Burlington Lakeshore Rotary Club organizes the four-day-long Ribfest to raise money for charity during the Labour Day weekend.

== History ==
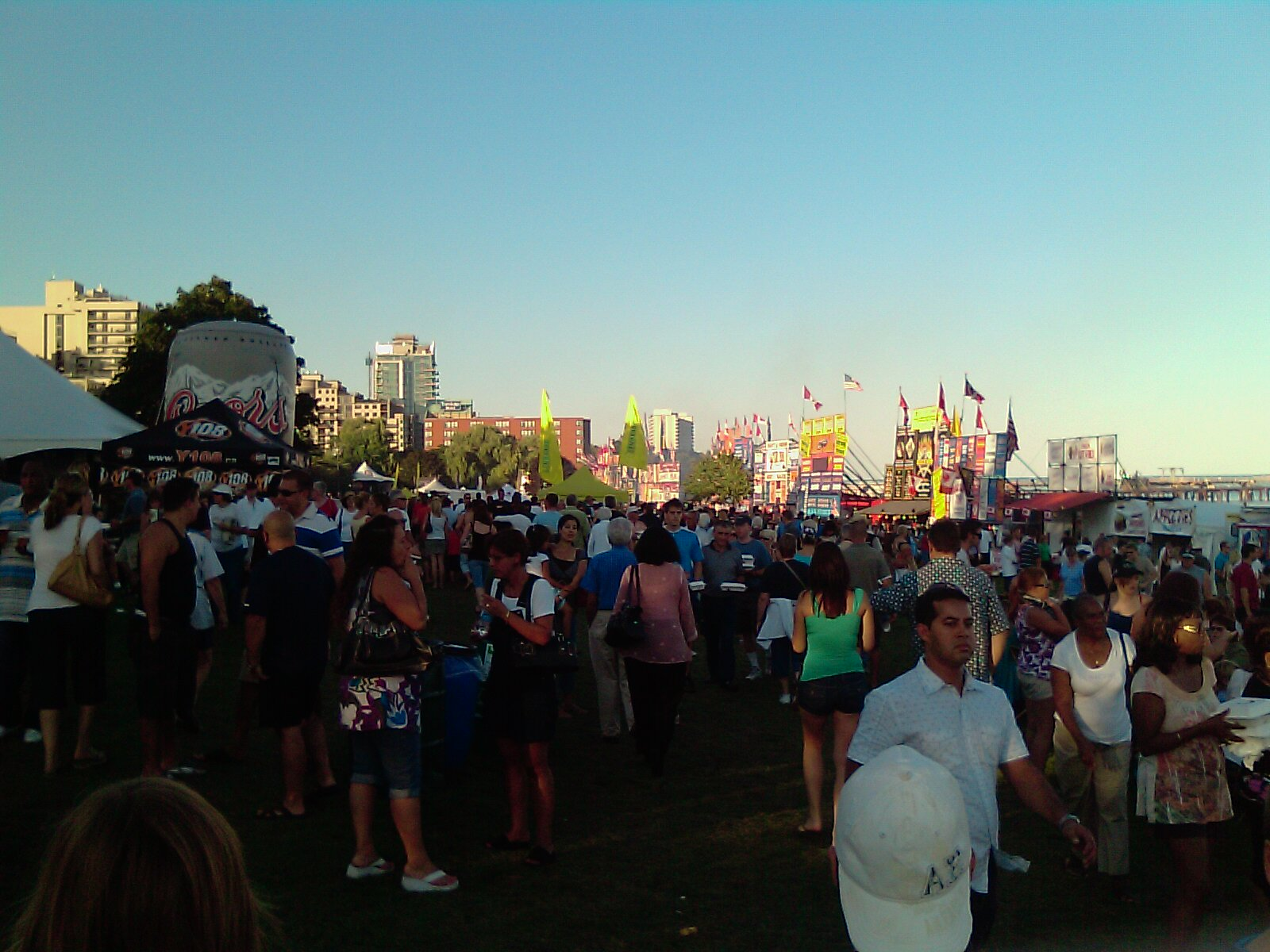
Canada's Largest Ribfest

The Burlington Lakeshore Rotary Club held the first Ribfest in 1996, then simply called the Ribfest.

By 2001, the festival had expanded to include ribs from 12 traveling rib teams.

The 2004 festival anticipated about 150,000 people eating 36 tonnes of ribs. It was called the Maple Leaf Pork Rotary Ribfest that year.

In early 2009, the Burlington Ribfest rebranded itself as "Canada's Largest Ribfest"—with its logo redesigned by Little Green Tree. In September, 175,000 people and 18 rib teams attended the 14th annual Canada's Largest Ribfest, consuming 150,000 lbs of ribs over the weekend. An estimated $320,000 was raised for local charities.

In 2010, the Canadian Federal government provided Can$98,610 in funding for the Ribfest as part of a Can$100 million Marquee Tourism Events Program fund.

2020, 2021 and 2022 saw drive-thru Ribfests due to the COVID-19 pandemic restrictions.

== Economic impact ==
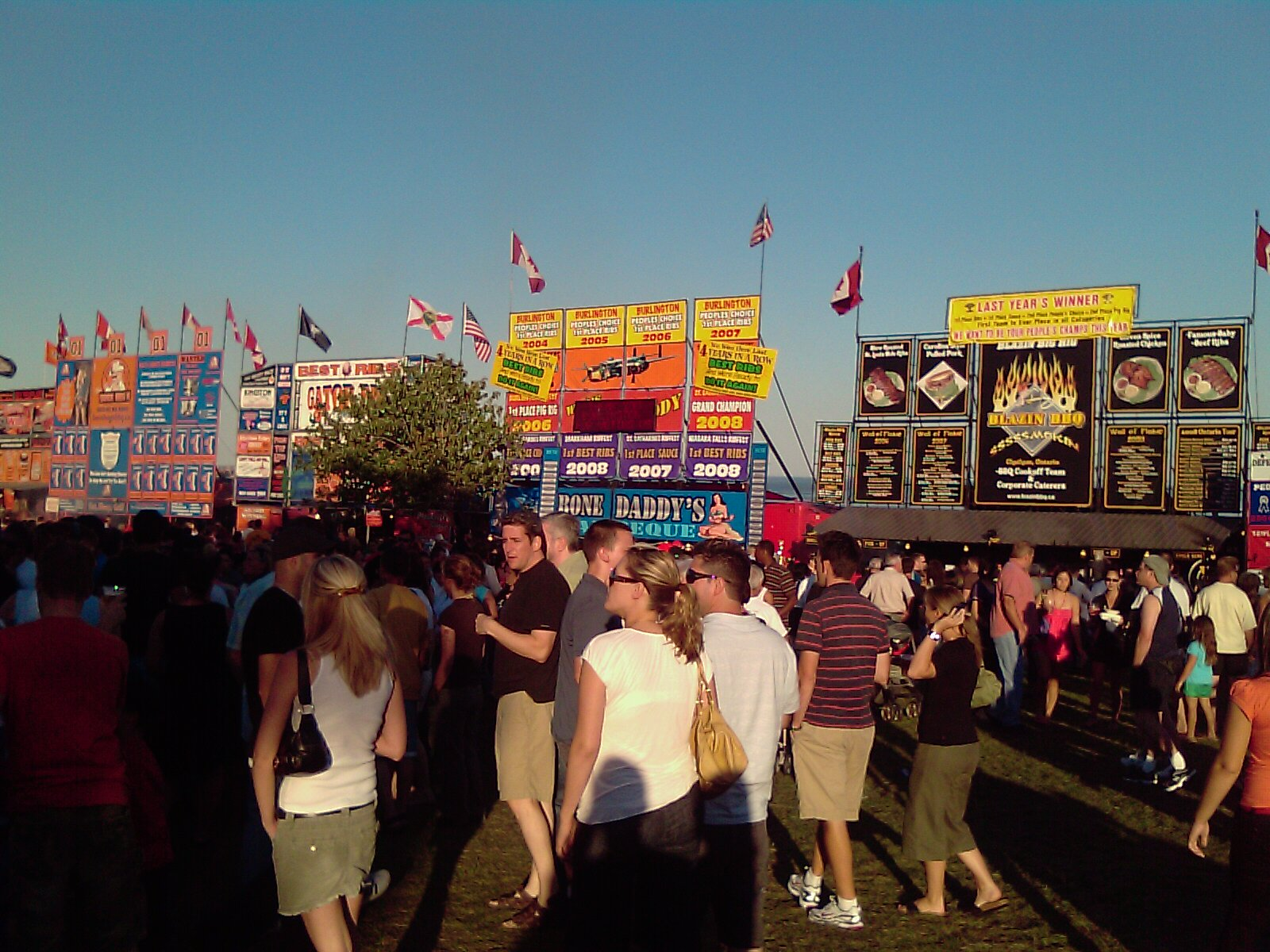
Some of the Ribbers and crowd, 2008

In 2003, an economic study was conducted on "Canada's Largest Ribfest." It found that almost 50% of visitors to the Ribfest come from outside Burlington. About 100% of those who came to the Ribfest would recommend it to out-of-town friends and/or relatives. About 69% said they would attend in 2007. About $1.8 million is being spent in the region by consumers.

== Charitable fundraising ==
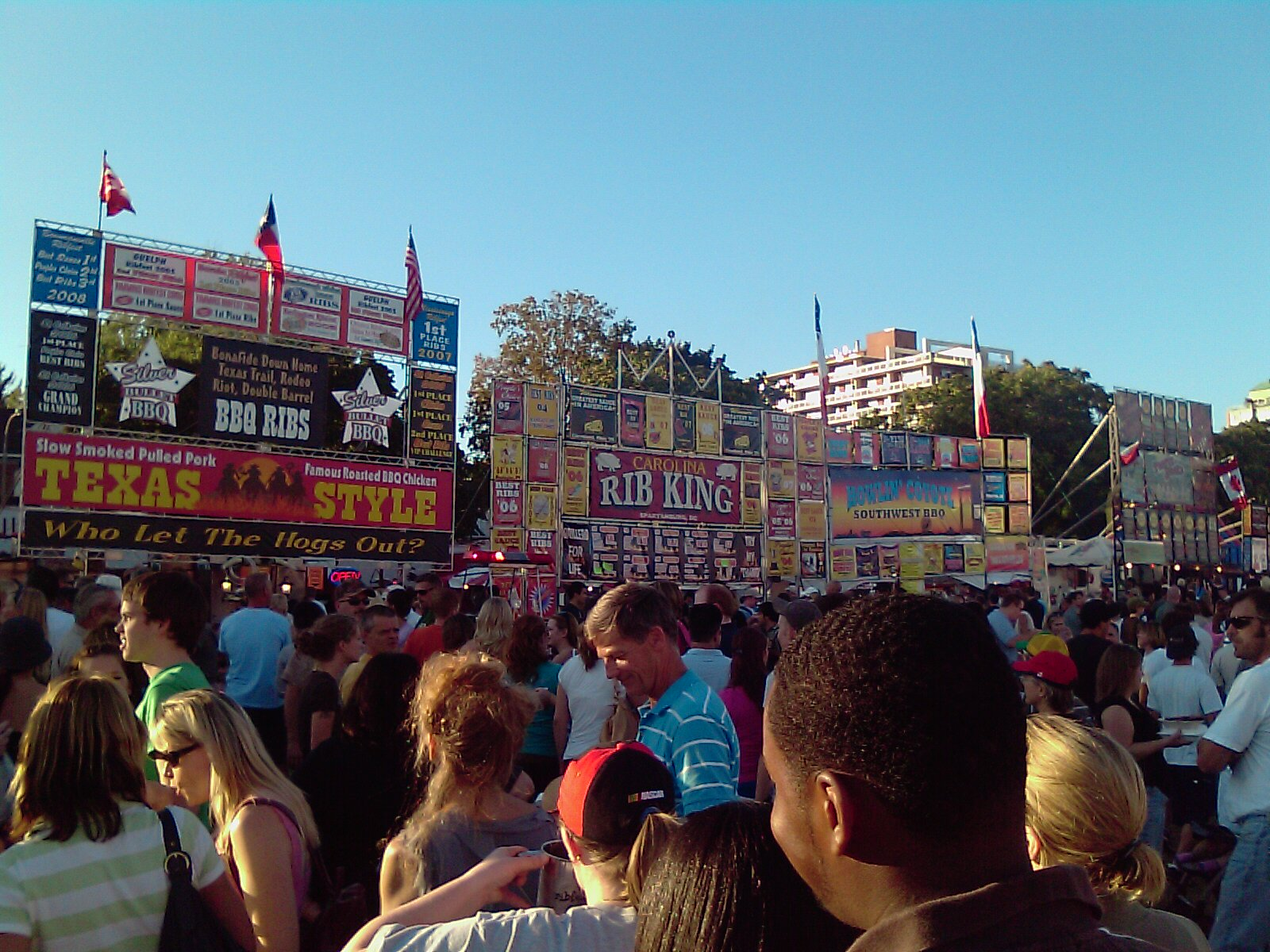
Some of the Ribbers and crowd, 2008

The Ribfest's funds are split to local organizations, business, and hospitals.

This is some of them:

- Scouts Canada
- Rotary Youth Leadership Awards
- Scholarships and Bursaries
- Burlington Teen Tour Band
- Burlington Art Centre
- Salvation Army
- The Carpenter Hospice
- Rotary Music festival
- Burlington International Games
- Burlington Food Bank
- Joseph Brant Hospital
- Children's Assessment & Treatment Centre
- Habitat for Humanity

== See also ==
- Burlington Sound of Music
