= Naperville Ribfest =

Annual food festival held at Knoch Park in Naperville, Illinois, US

The Naperville Ribfest was an annual ribfest held at Knoch Park in Naperville, Illinois, USA over the Fourth of July weekend. It was a fundraiser that involved food, live music and carnival rides. The first Naperville Ribfest was inaugurated in 1988. The 2022 ribfest occurred at the DuPage County Fairgrounds in Wheaton, Illinois.

There was no ribfest in 2020. Naperville Ribfest was permanently cancelled in July of 2024, ending a 35 year run.
