= Lone Star Chili Cook-off =

Texas Chili Cookoff
- Type: Contest
- Established: 1994
- Location: New York City, US

The Texas Chili Cook-off (formerly "Lone Star Chili Cook-off") is an annual chili cook-off held during May in New York City. The event is organized and run by the 'New York Texas Exes', local alumni chapter of the University of Texas at Austin. Proceeds from the Cook-off benefit the chapter's scholarship endowment.

== History ==
The first Texas Chili Cook-off was held in 1994. Attendance at the event was under 100 and only 8 chili teams competed. Today, the event draws upwards of 1,500 in attendance, has 36 teams competing and has a panel of 9 judges with professional experience in the food industry. The 2013 Cook-off is widely regarded as the most competitive to date.

There was no 2020 cook-off because of the COVID-19 pandemic in New York City.

== Teams ==
Teams consist of up to five members and are required to provide 5 gallons of chili to serve at the event. Prizes are awarded to the top three teams as well as a "People's Choice" winner. The prizes all consist of Shiner Bock beer, which is otherwise unavailable in New York City. Prizes are as follows:

- 1st Place - 2 cases of Shiner Bock
- 2nd Place - 1 case of Shiner Bock
- 3rd Place - ½ case of Shiner Bock (12 pack)
- Best Presentation - ½ case of Shiner Bock (12 pack) - new for 2011
- Best Restaurant Chili - ½ case of Shiner Bock (12 pack) - new for 2011
- People's Choice - ½ case of Shiner Bock (12 pack)

== Judging ==
The panel is made up of nine judges who all have professional experience in the food industry. The teams are divided into three groups of nine. Three judges judge each group. From each group, the top three teams advance to the final, where all nine judges will judge each chili. Judging is scored in the following categories:

- Color
- Heat
- Texture
- Flavor/Taste

== Results ==
- 2013
  - First Place - Red Hot Chili Peppers
- 2012
  - First Place - Austin Chili Limits
  - Second Place - Come and Take It Chili Co
  - Third Place - Dog's Mustache Chili Co.
  - People's Choice - Soy Caliente
  - Team Presentation - Chili con Blarney
- 2011
  - First Place - WildER Turkeys
  - Second Place - T Love and Special Sauce
  - Third Place - Dog's Mustache Chili Co.
  - People's Choice - WildER Turkeys
  - Team Presentation - T Love and Special Sauce
- 2010
  - First Place - Whaley Hot
  - Second Place - More Cowbell
  - Third Place (tie) - Austin Chili Limits/Big Tex & the Southern Sweethearts
  - People's Choice - WildER Turkey's
