= Chilympiad =

Chili cooking competition in Texas, US

Coordinates: 29°50′46″N 97°57′20″W

The Chilympiad was a Texas tradition held annually in the second week of September from 1970 to 2002. It originated in San Marcos, Texas, at Aquarena Springs, but in 1974, was relocated to its permanent headquarters at the Hays County Civic Center, also in San Marcos. The event was a competition of chili cooking. Winners of the contest automatically qualified for the World Championship Chili Cookoff at Terlingua, Texas.

The rules were few and simple, being no more than:

1. All chili must be made from scratch at the site of the contest.
2. Women are barred from entering the contest as chefs.

In response to the second rule, another cookoff was established in Luckenbach, Texas, named "Hell Hath No Fury Like A Woman Scorned," in which the winners similarly qualify for the world championship cookoff.

In 2001, the Chilympiad was scheduled for September 14 and 15. The September 11 attacks severely impacted participation and attendance at the event. The event lost $30,000. Attendance improved for 2002, but the event lost $19,000. Chilympiad was cancelled for 2003. Although the El Jefe Association, which organized the annual event, hoped to revive the festival in 2004, they were not able to recoup from previous losses, and was terminated hereafter.
