= Spencer Smith Park =

Park in Burlington, Ontario, Canada

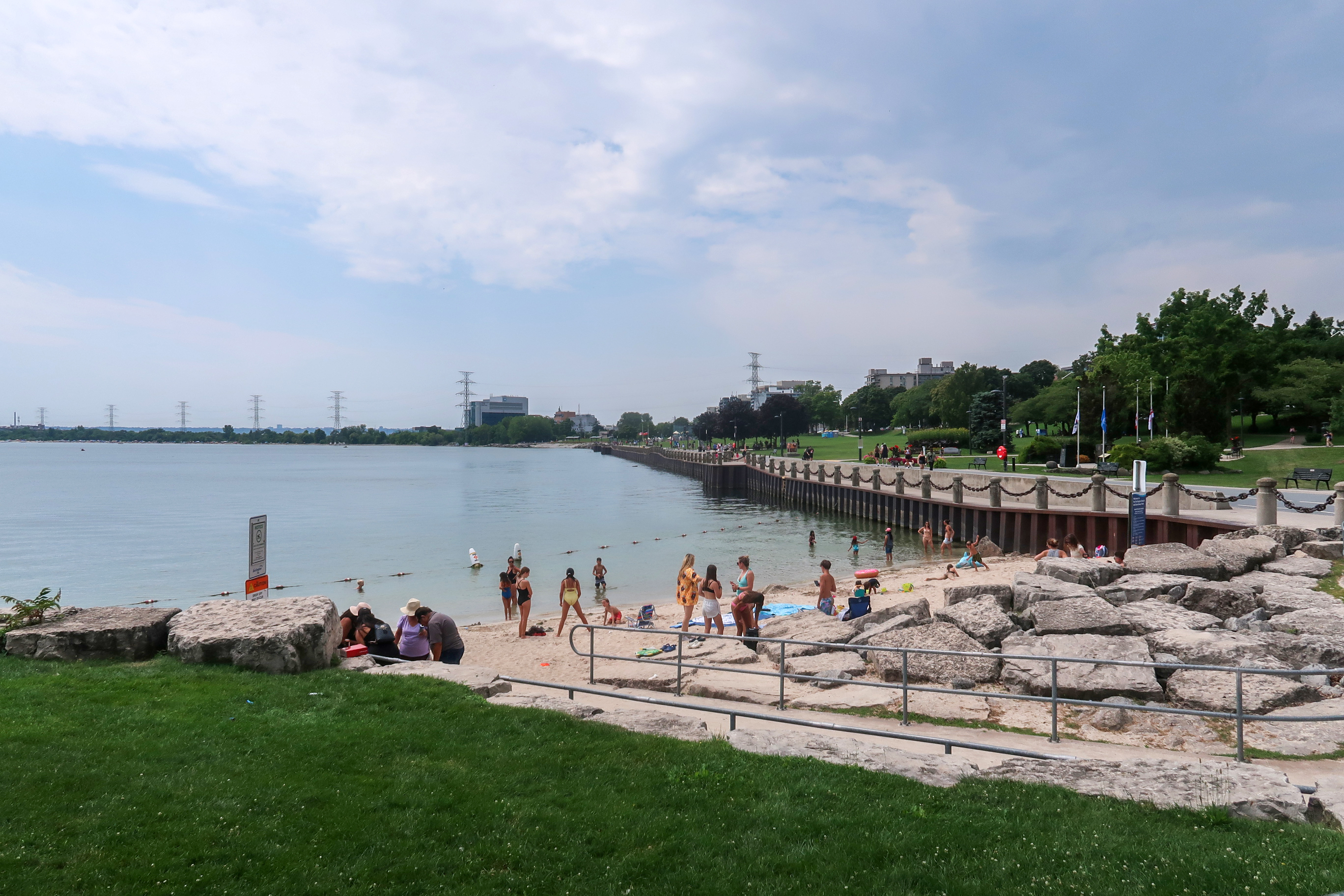
- Spencer Smith Park in downtown Burlington
- Interactive map of Spencer Smith Park
- Type: Public park
- Location: Burlington, Ontario, Canada
- Coordinates: 43°19′17″N 79°47′55″W
- Operator: City of Burlington

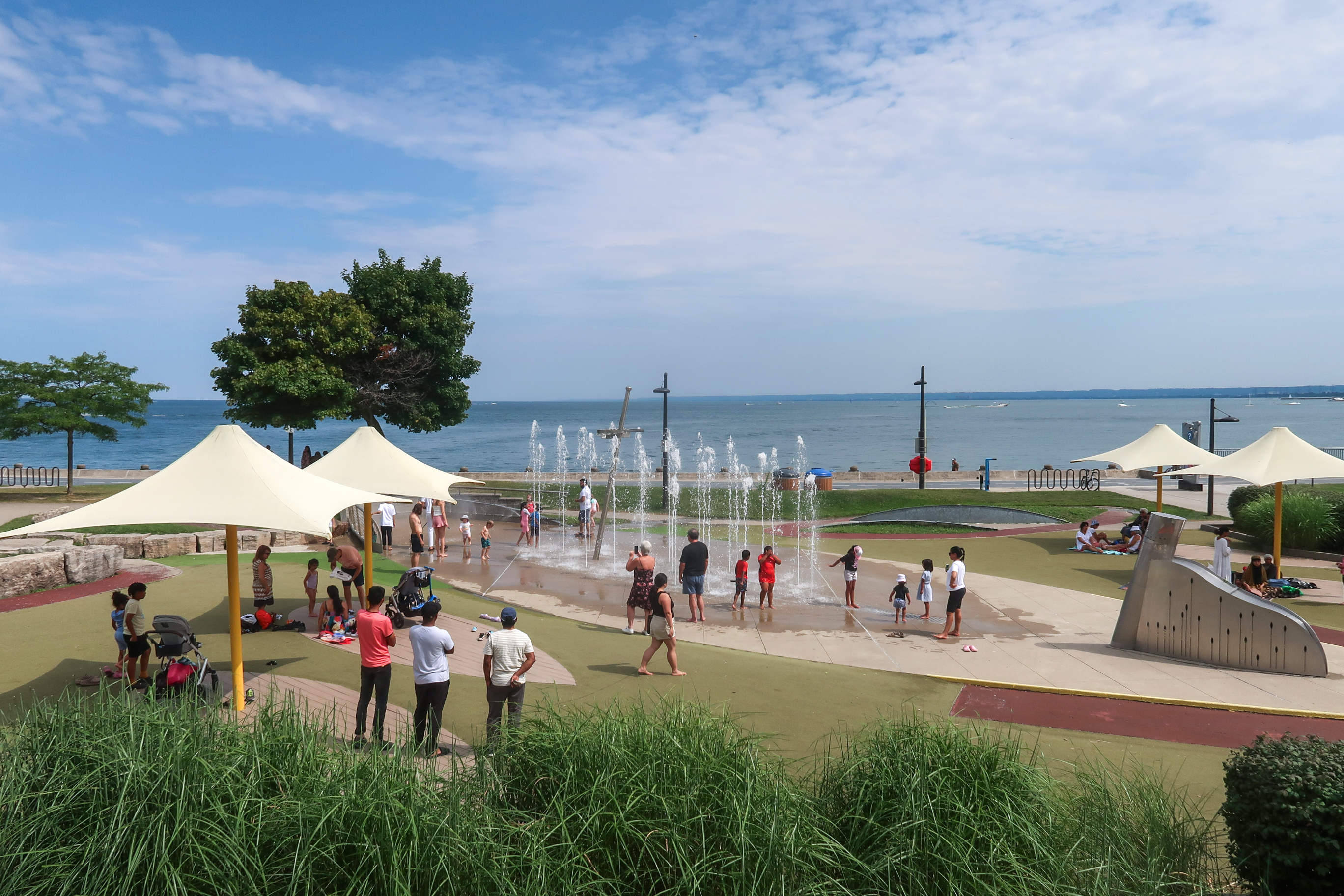
Splash pad in the park

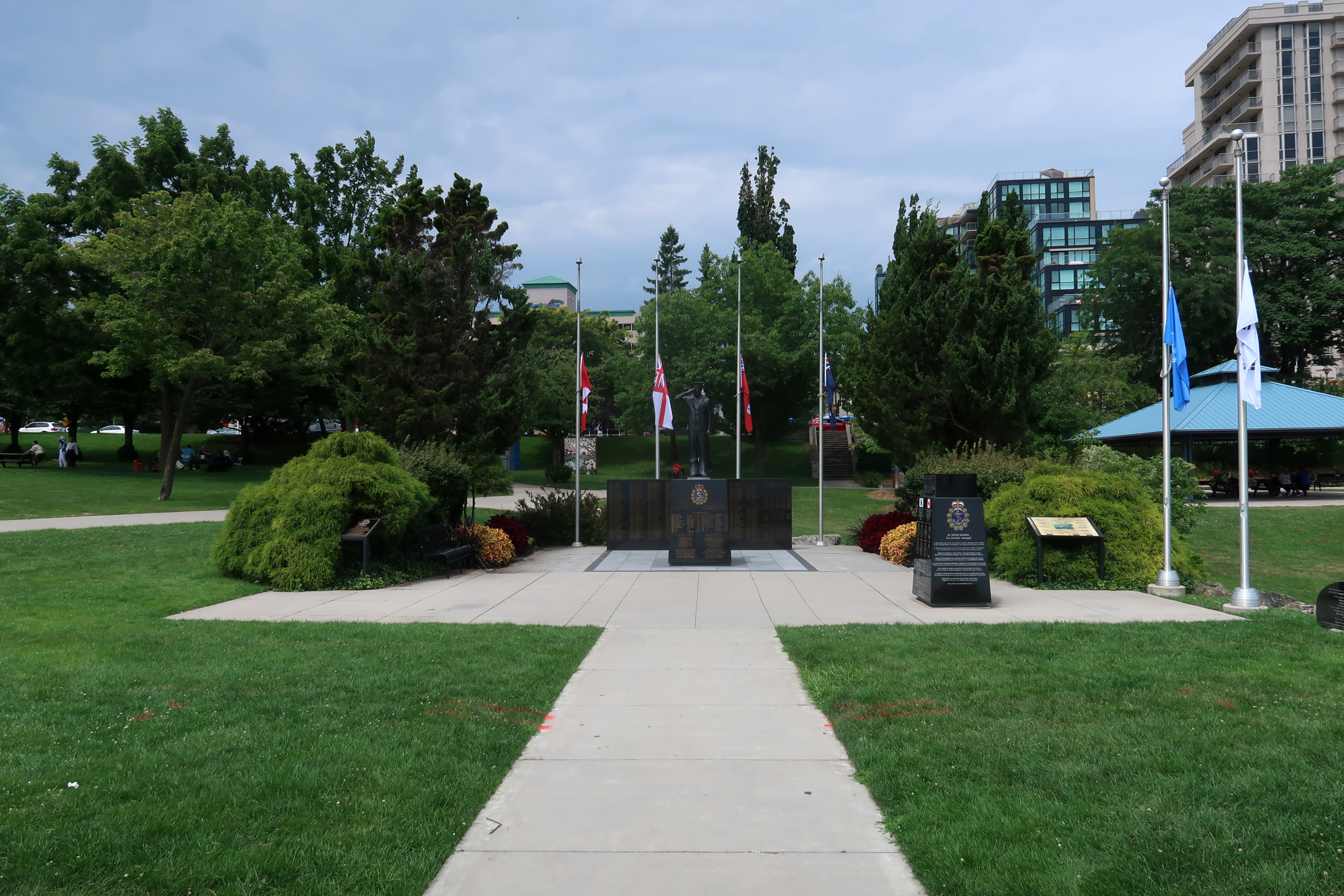
"Royal Canadian Naval Association Naval Memorial"(1995) by André Gauthier (sculptor) in Spencer Smith Park

Spencer Smith Park is a park in downtown Burlington, Ontario located on the shore of Lake Ontario. It was named in memory of Spencer Smith, a former president of the Burlington Horticultural Society who was instrumental in the development of the park system throughout the city. It is home to the Sound of Music Festival, Canada's Largest Ribfest and the Burlington Beer Festival. It has a small beach and plenty of walking paths along Lake Ontario.

The City of Burlington Waterfront Project opened in early June 2006. It is home to Spencer's, a restaurant with a capacity of more than two hundred diners, with a large patio are entirely made of glass offering beautiful views of Lake Ontario and Lakeshore Road. The Centennial Pond features ice skating in the winter months, and is used as a model sailboat pond in the summer. The Dofasco Waterjet plaza also opened in late July 2006 and offers a water play area for children with jets spraying water in the air, as well as a playground.

Along the walking path, across from the water, there is a Navy Memorial which recognizes the Canadian seamen that served in the Second World War. "Royal Canadian Naval Association Naval Memorial (1995)" by André Gauthier is a 6’4" high-cast bronze statue of a World War II Canadian sailor in the position of attention saluting his lost shipmates, which was erected in Spencer Smith Park. The model for the statue was a local Sea Cadet wearing Mike Vencel's naval service uniform. On the black granite base, the names of Royal Canadian Navy and Canadian Merchant Navy ships sunk during World War II are engraved.

On June 16, 2013, during the annual Sound of Music Festival and Fathers' day, the 137 meter long attraction Brant Street Pier officially opened to the public as a part of the park. The pier is designed with a walkway, raised platform and a beacon.

== See also ==
- Brant Street Pier
- Waterfront Trail
- Sound of Music Festival
- Canada's Largest Ribfest
- Burlington Beer Festival
