= Joseph Brant Hospital =

Hospital in Burlington, Ontario, Canada

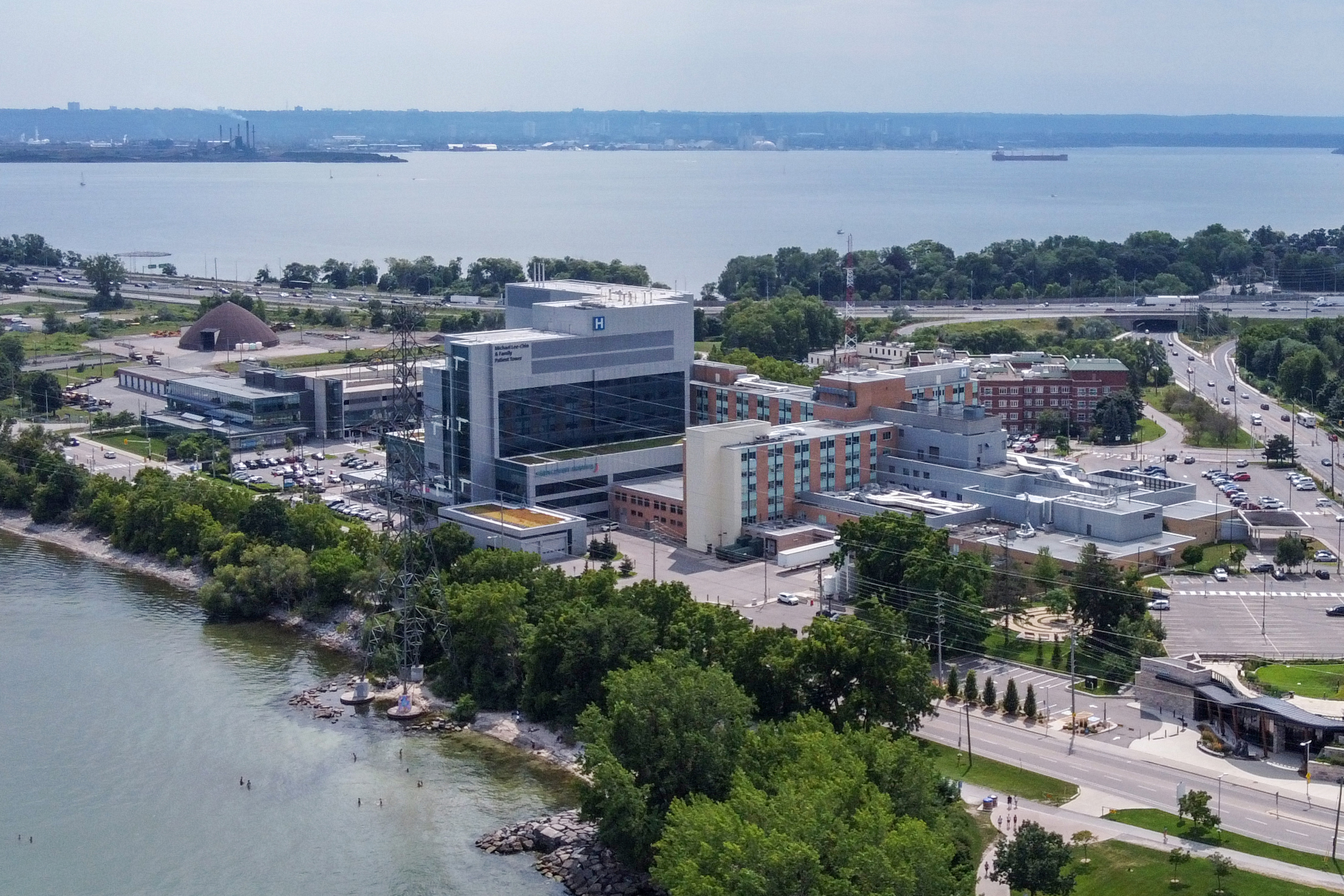

Geography
- Location: 1245 Lakeshore Road Burlington, Ontario, Canada
- Coordinates: 43°19′2″N 79°48′9″W

Organization
- Care system: Public Medicare (Canada) (OHIP)
- Type: Community
- Affiliated university: McMaster University

Services
- Emergency department: Yes
- Beds: 245

History
- Founded: February 1, 1961

Links
- Website: www.josephbranthospital.ca
- Lists: Hospitals in Canada

Joseph Brant Hospital is a hospital in Burlington, Ontario, Canada.

During the COVID-19 pandemic, the hospital was the first in Canada to erect a pandemic response unit. Designed by Adamson Associates Architects in joint venture with Parkin Architects Limited, this facility was built in April 2020 with 76 beds and began accepting patients in early January 2021. It was housing patients who had received their preliminary treatment in the main hospital and were showing improvement.

== Name ==
The hospital is named after Joseph Brant, a Mohawk military and political leader, slaveowner and prominent political figure in the early history of Thayendanegea region. Joseph Brant Hospital stands on part of the land bought for him by Upper Canada's Lieutenant Governor, John Graves Simcoe.

== Size ==
Joseph Brant Hospital opened on February 1, 1961, with 228 beds. In 1971, the Hospital expanded to 450 beds. In 1996 due to a major hospital restructuring occurring in Ontario, the Hospital contracted to 273 beds and in 2006 reduced to 256 beds. The hospital now has 245 inpatient beds.

From 2012 to 2013, the hospital had 13,258 admissions, the Emergency Department had 47,326 visits in 2012-13 and 1,459 births were recorded. The hospital has a skilled staff of 175 physicians, 1,400 full and part-time professional health care staff and more than 600 active volunteers.

== Catchment area ==
Joseph Brant Hospital has a huge geographic catchment area in the Halton and Hamilton-Wentworth Regions; about a quarter million people reside in this area which includes parts of Flamborough Township, the City of Hamilton, and Stoney Creek and all of Burlington and Waterdown.
