= Art Gallery of Burlington =

Public gallery in Burlington, Ontario, Canada

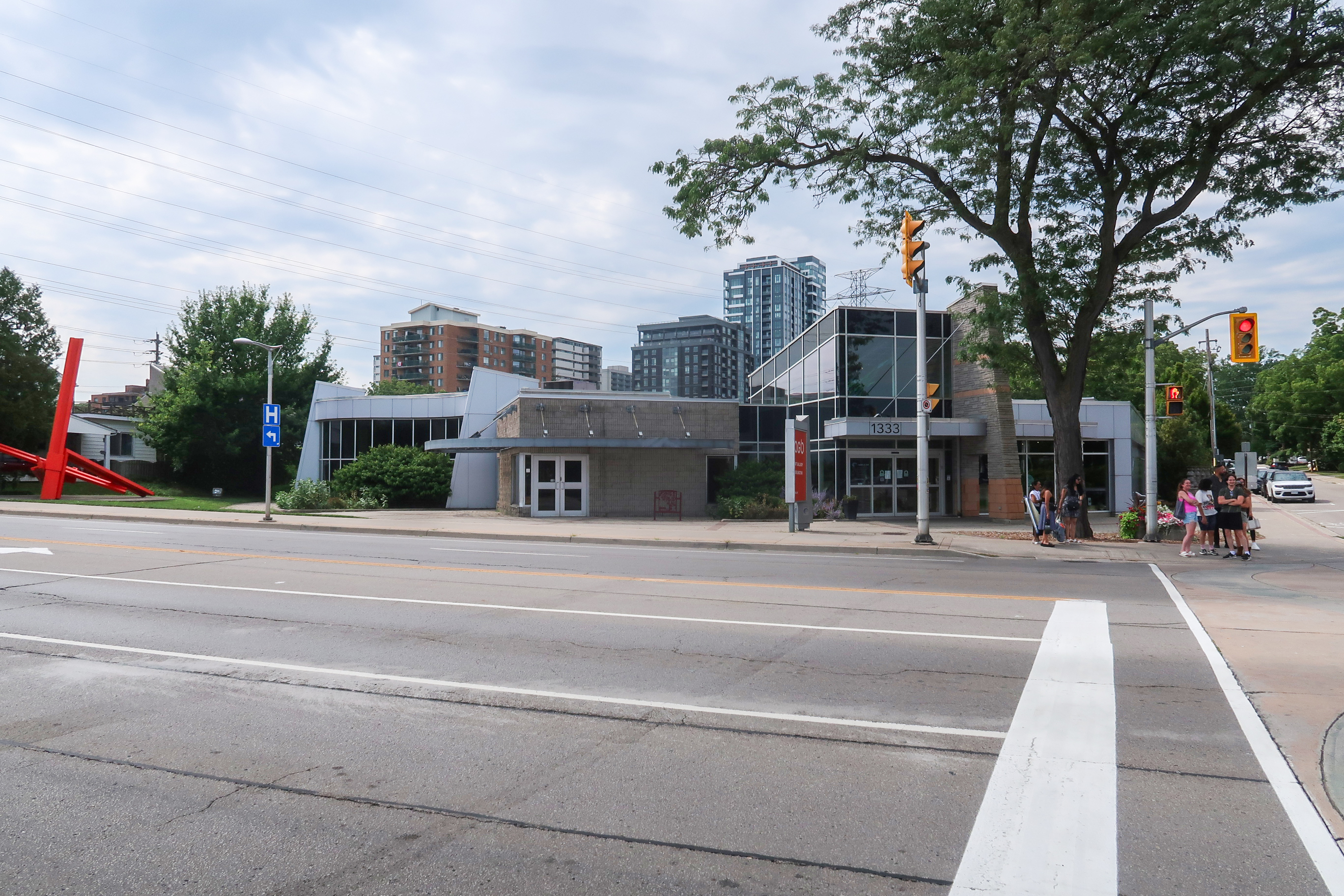
- Established: 1978
- Location: 1333 Lakeshore Road; Burlington, Ontario, Canada
- Coordinates: 43°19′15″N 79°48′02″W
- Type: Art museum
- Website: artgalleryofburlington.com

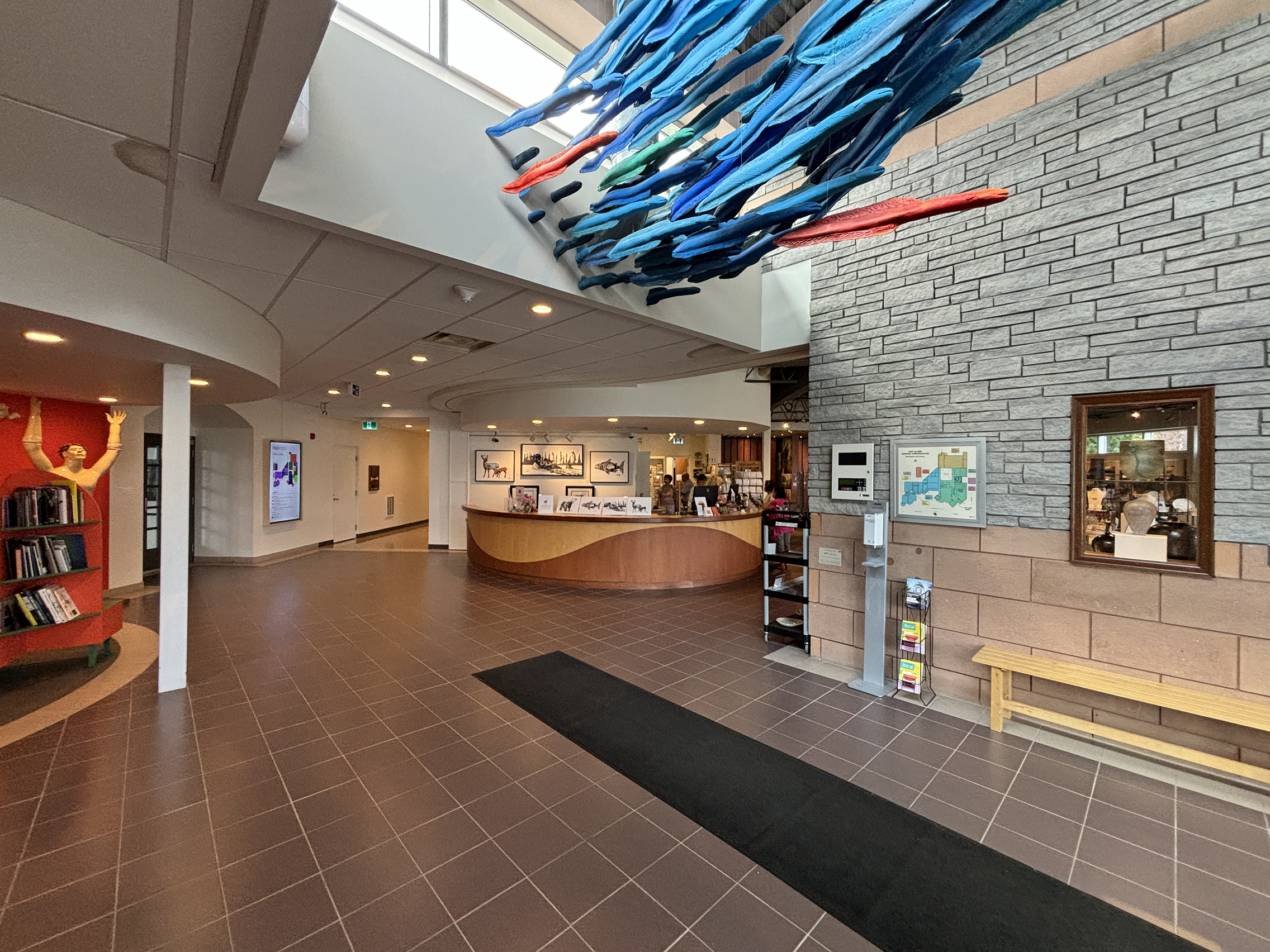
Lobby

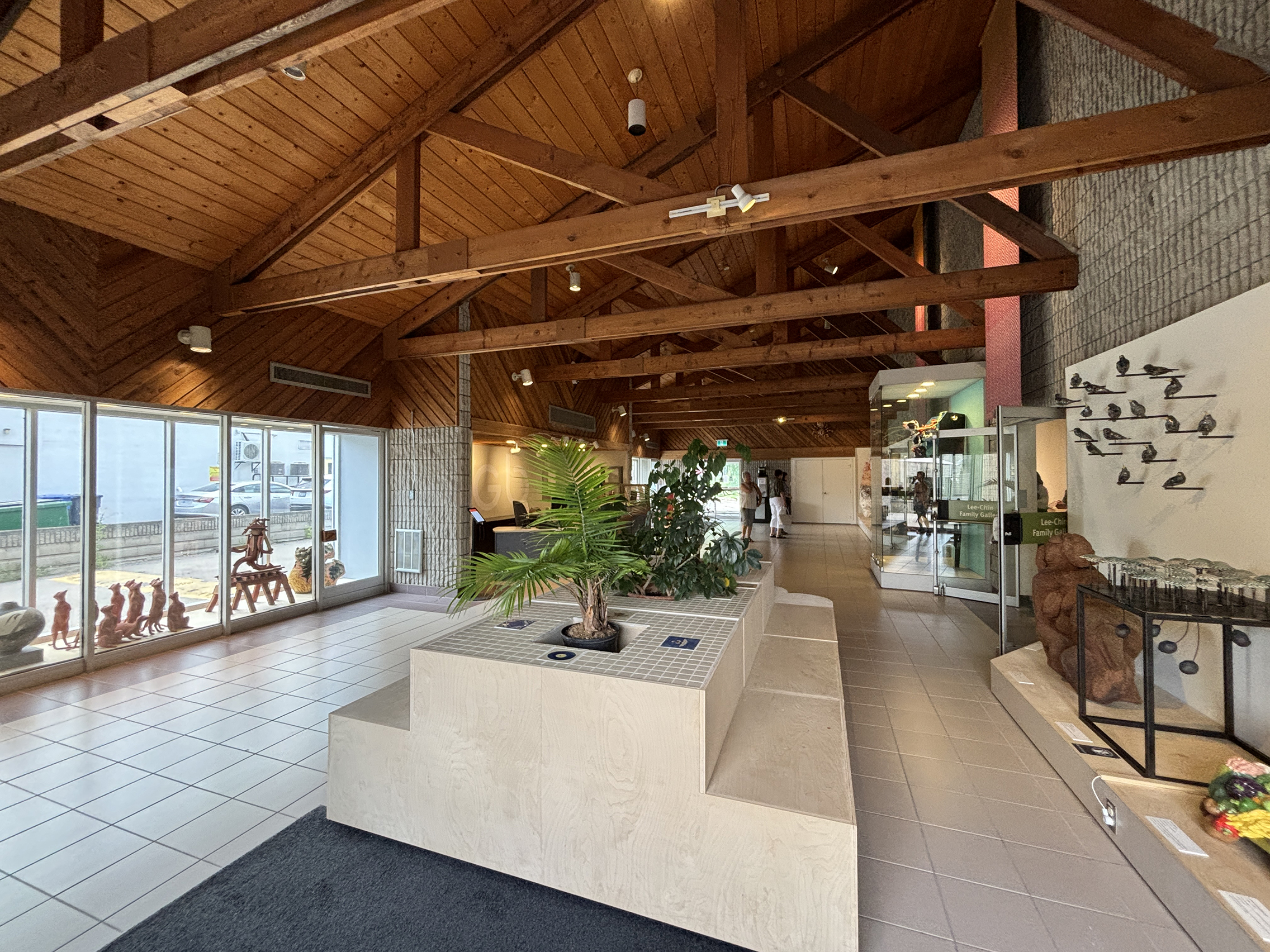
Lee-Chin Family Gallery

The Art Gallery of Burlington, founded in 1978, is the seventh largest public art gallery in Ontario. The gallery collects and maintains Canada's largest collection of contemporary Canadian ceramics. It is located on the City of Burlington waterfront in close proximity to Spencer Smith Park.

== History ==
It was formed by several active visual arts co-operatives and guilds in the Burlington region. It was opened in 1978 as a facility for art groups to develop dedicated studios, photography, hand weaving, spinning, sculpture, woodcarving, ceramics, fine arts, and hooking craft know today as Arts Burlington. The gallery expanded and it started to become a public art gallery with exhibitions, publications, and a collection (begun in 1983) of contemporary Canadian ceramic art and educational programs. The facility has undergone two capital expansions in 1991 and 2001.

== Facility ==
The art gallery operates a 4,100-square-metre (44,000 sq ft) facility with exhibition spaces that include the 400-square-metre (4,300 sq ft) AIC Gallery, the 40-square-metre (430 sq ft) F. R. (Bob) Perry Gallery, a collection atrium, multiple display cases throughout the facility for works in the collection, and a 225-square-metre (2,420 sq ft) exterior courtyard for site-specific exhibitions. The educational programs have 10 studio/classrooms. Meeting rooms, gallery shop, café and offices account for 1,400 square metres (15,000 sq ft).

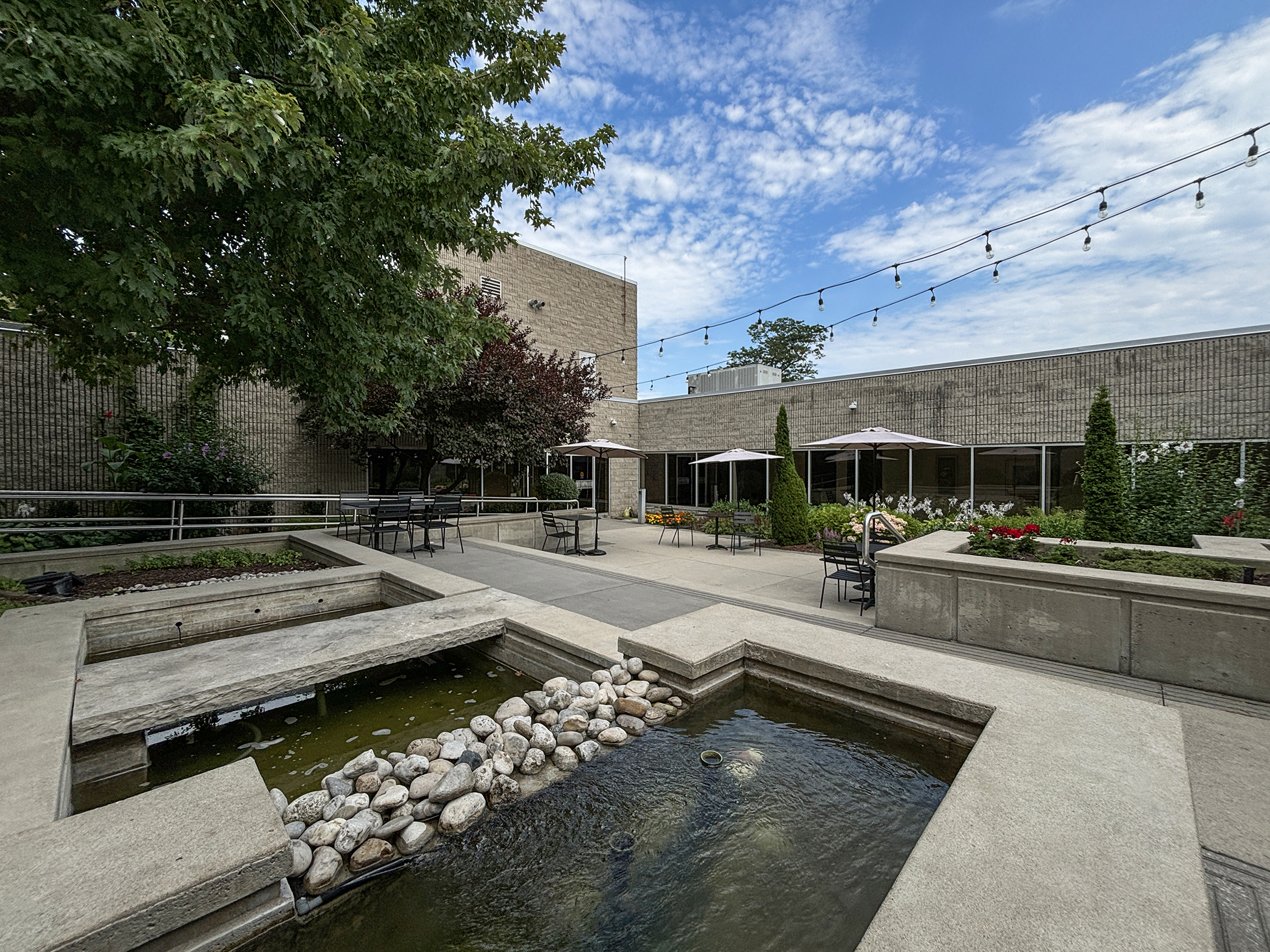
Courtyard

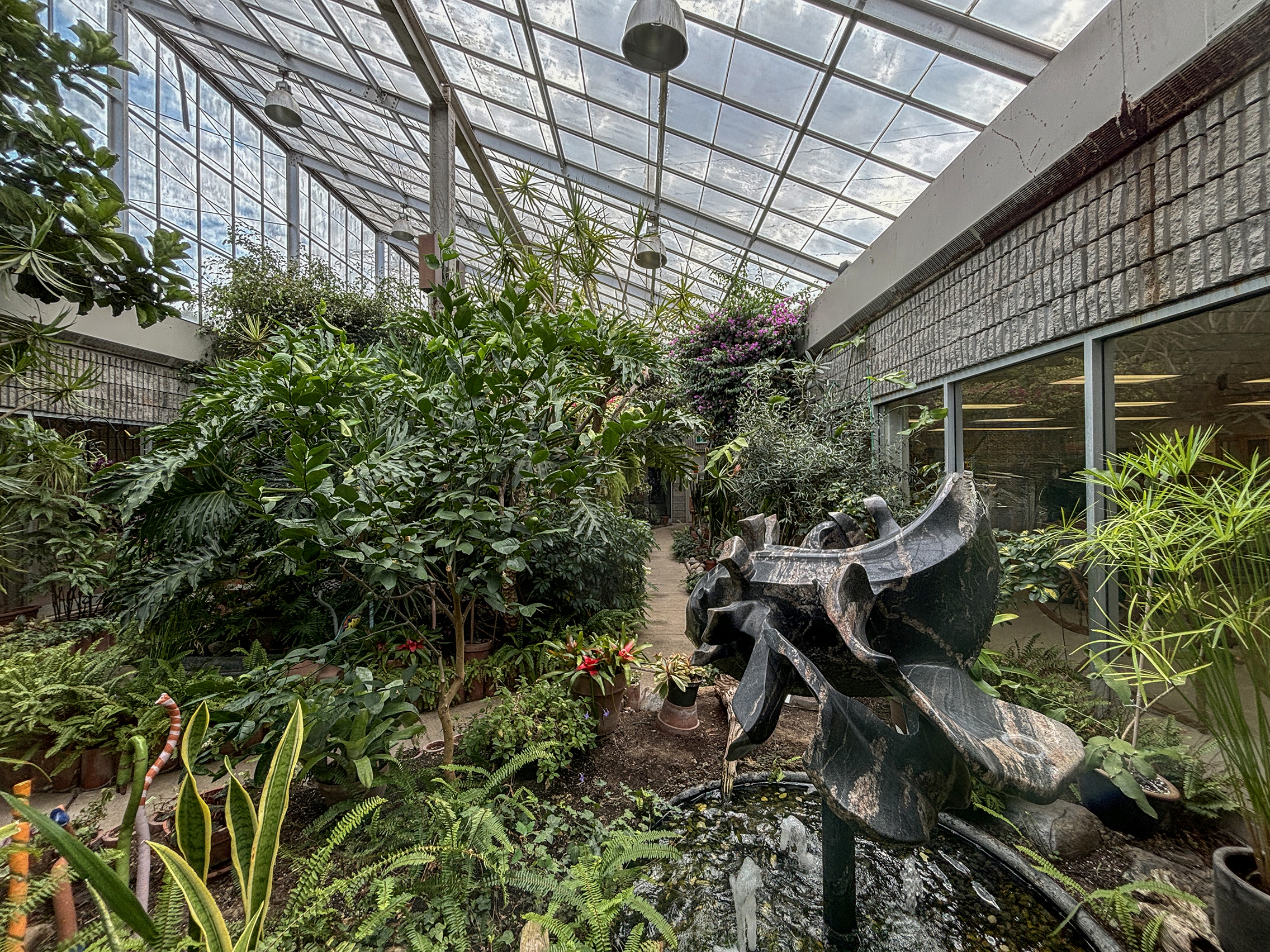
Conservatory inside the gallery

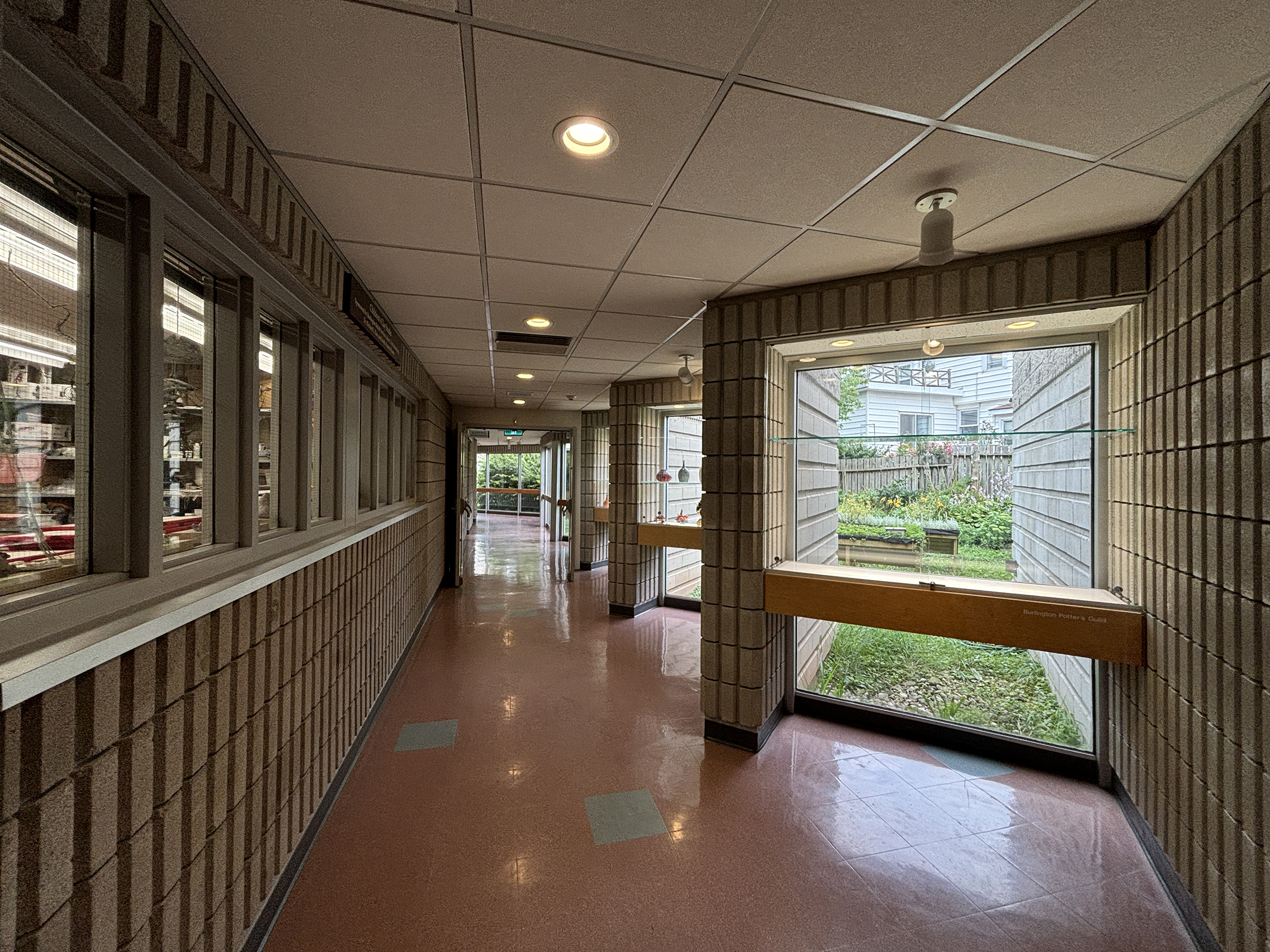
Corridor inside the gallery

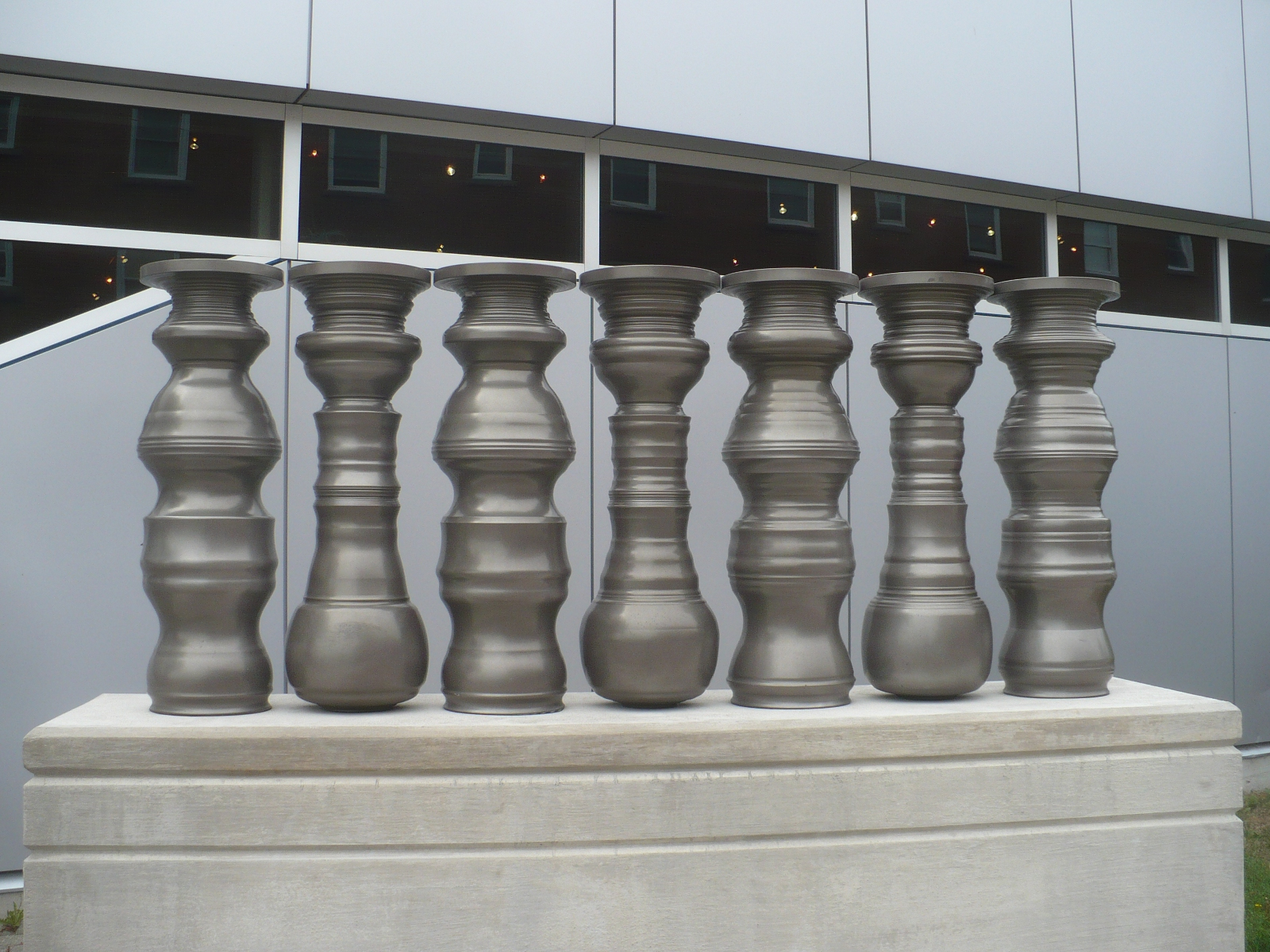
"Alumina, 2008" by Greg Payce, is on permanent display outside the east side of the building

== See also ==
- Spencer Smith Park
- Craft Ontario
