= London Ribfest =

Annual festival held in London, Ontario, Canada

- Begins: July 30, 2026
- Ends: August 3, 2026
- Frequency: Annual
- Locations: Victoria Park, London, Ontario, Canada
- Inaugurated: 1985
- Most recent: 2025
- Participants: 200,000
- Website: canadasbiggestparty.com

The London Ribfest is a festival held annually in London, Ontario, Canada on the weekend of Civic Holiday. It has been running since 1985 and involves charity and home show exhibits.

== History ==
Three years after the London Ribfest festival first started, the Boys & Girls Clubs of London took over operations for 20 years. In 2008, they decided to end their involvement with Ribfest, citing ongoing financial and sponsorship concerns. The possible cancellation of another festival in London caused concerns with how the city handles its festivals.

The city choose to pass the event to London-based company, Family Shows Canada, and in 2009, Family Shows Canada took over the operations of London Ribfest.

The London Ribfest has since expanded their list of things to do and eat at the event. In 2010, the event had 225 exhibits, 100 live bands, cooking demonstrations, food vendors, and amusement rides.

2020 was on hiatus for the first time on grounds of COVID-19 pandemic.
