= Sound of Music Festival =

Annual music festival in Burlington, Ontario

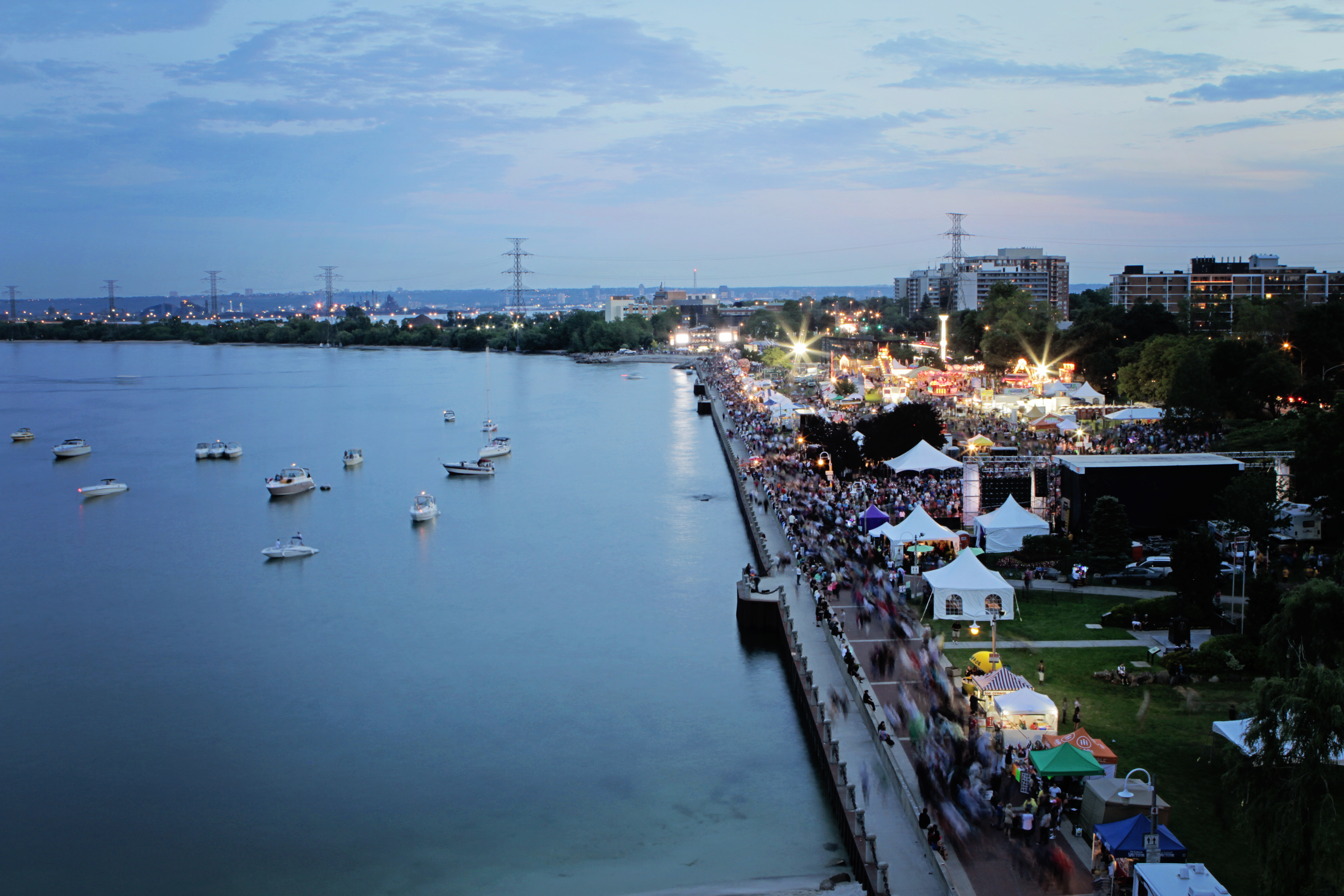
- The 2012 Sound of Music Festival
- Genre: Various
- Dates: Father's Day weekend
- Locations: Spencer Smith Park (Burlington, Ontario, Canada)
- Coordinates: 43°19′17″N 79°47′56″W
- Years active: 1980–2025
- Organizer: Burlington's Sound of Music Festival Inc.
- Website: soundofmusic.ca

The Sound of Music Festival was an annual free music festival traditionally held in Burlington, Ontario, Canada. Founded in 1980, it was held in mid-June and usually falls on the Father's Day weekend. The festival was organized by the nonprofit organization Burlington's Sound of Music Festival Inc.

The festival had free admission and had previously been held along the city's waterfront Spencer Smith Park and the downtown core. It bills itself as "Canada's Largest Free Music Festival," and utilized several stages throughout the waterfront and downtown area.

As of 2025, the festival will no longer be held at Spencer Smith Park in Burlington, after 45 years of residency. The change was announced due to financial constraints and the end of its sponsorship by city council. In February 2026, it was announced that the festival would be replaced by the Lakeshore Music & Arts Festival, starting in June of the same year

== Past performers ==
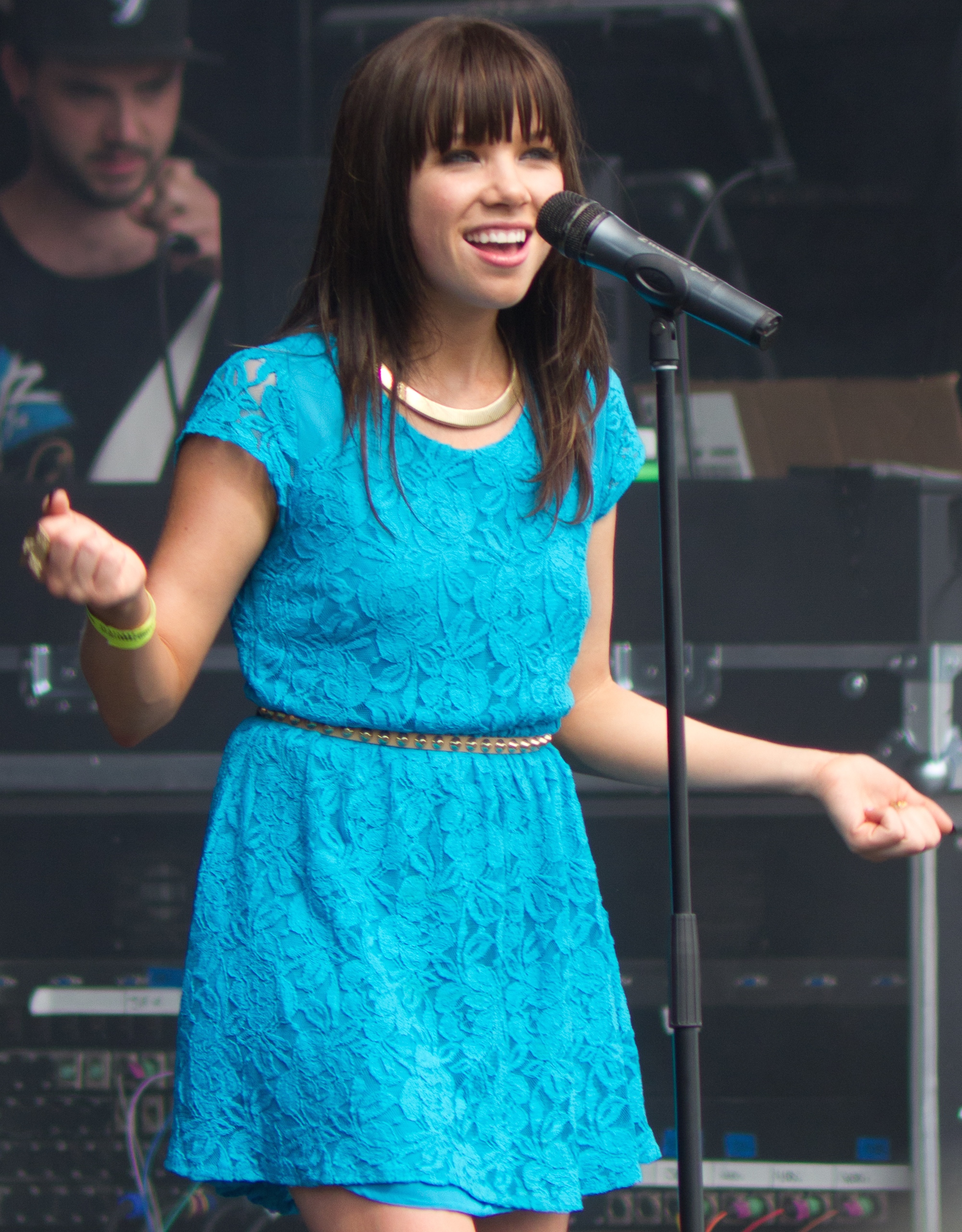
Carly Rae Jepsen at the Sound of Music, 2012

Musical performers have included:

- Tom Cochrane
- Marianas Trench
- Faber Drive
- Finger Eleven
- Sloan
- New York Dolls
- Men Without Hats
- The Tea Party
- Carly Rae Jepsen
- The Trews
- Jacksoul
- Bedouin Soundclash
- Great Lake Swimmers
- Devo
- Ashley MacIsaac
- David Wilcox
- These Kids Wear Crowns
- Smash Mouth

== See also ==
- Canada's Largest Ribfest
