= Burlington, Ontario =

City in Ontario, Canada

Burlington
- City (lower-tier)
- City of Burlington
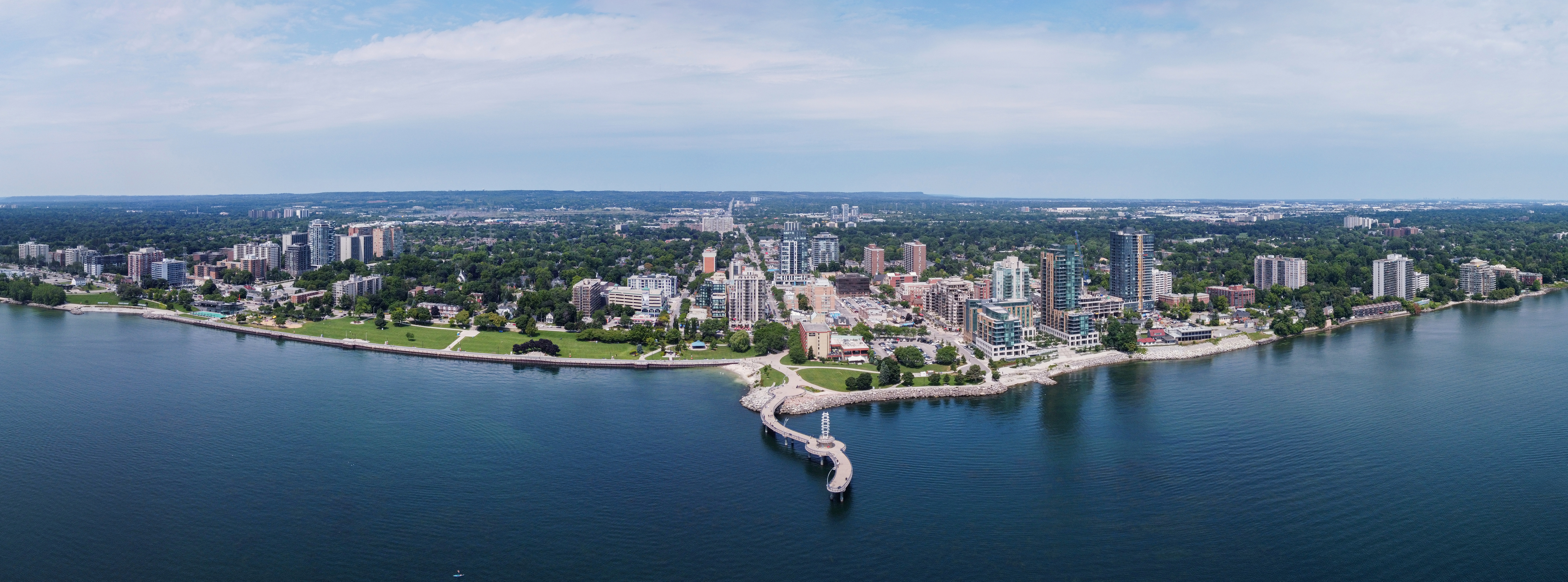
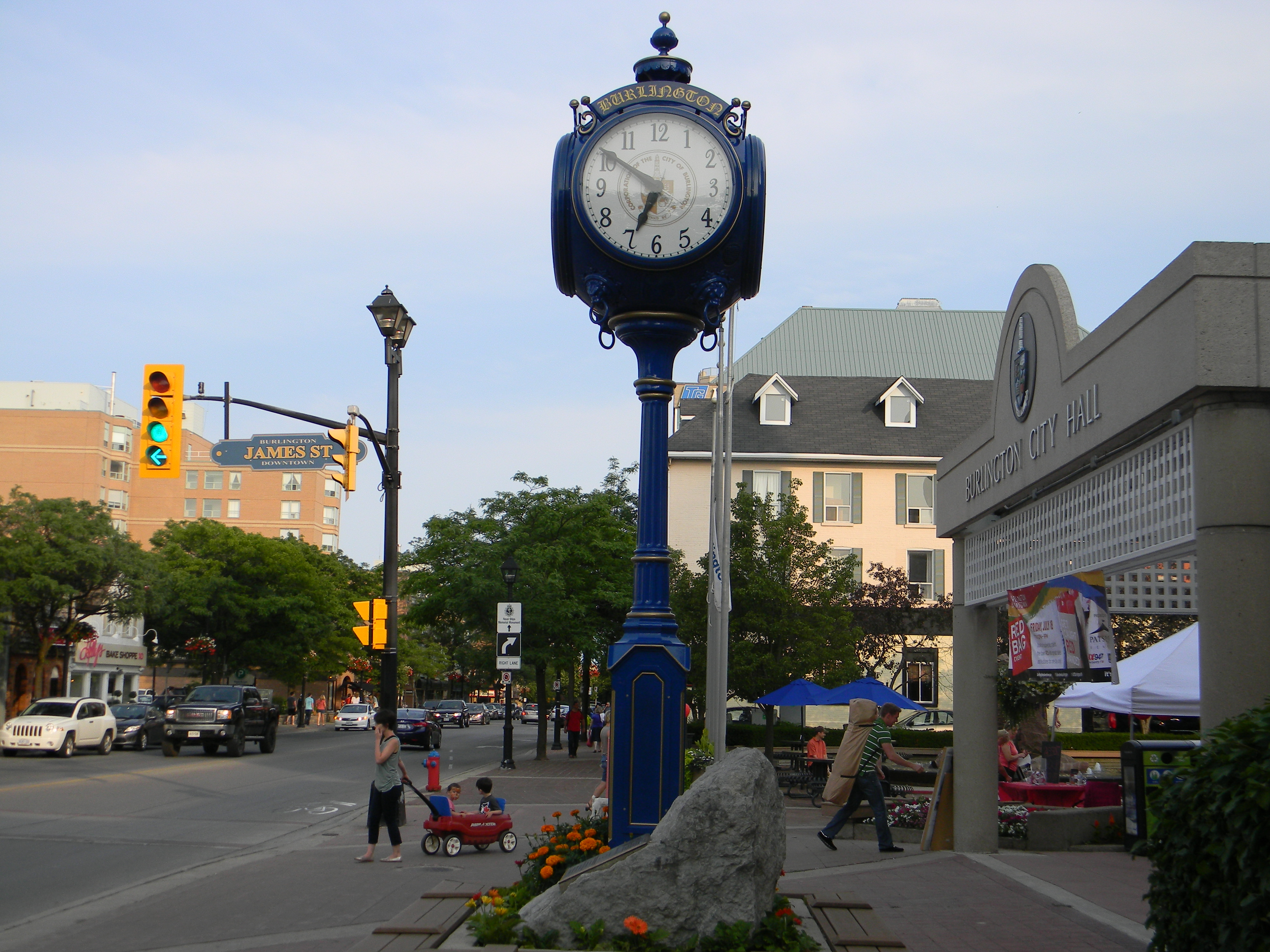
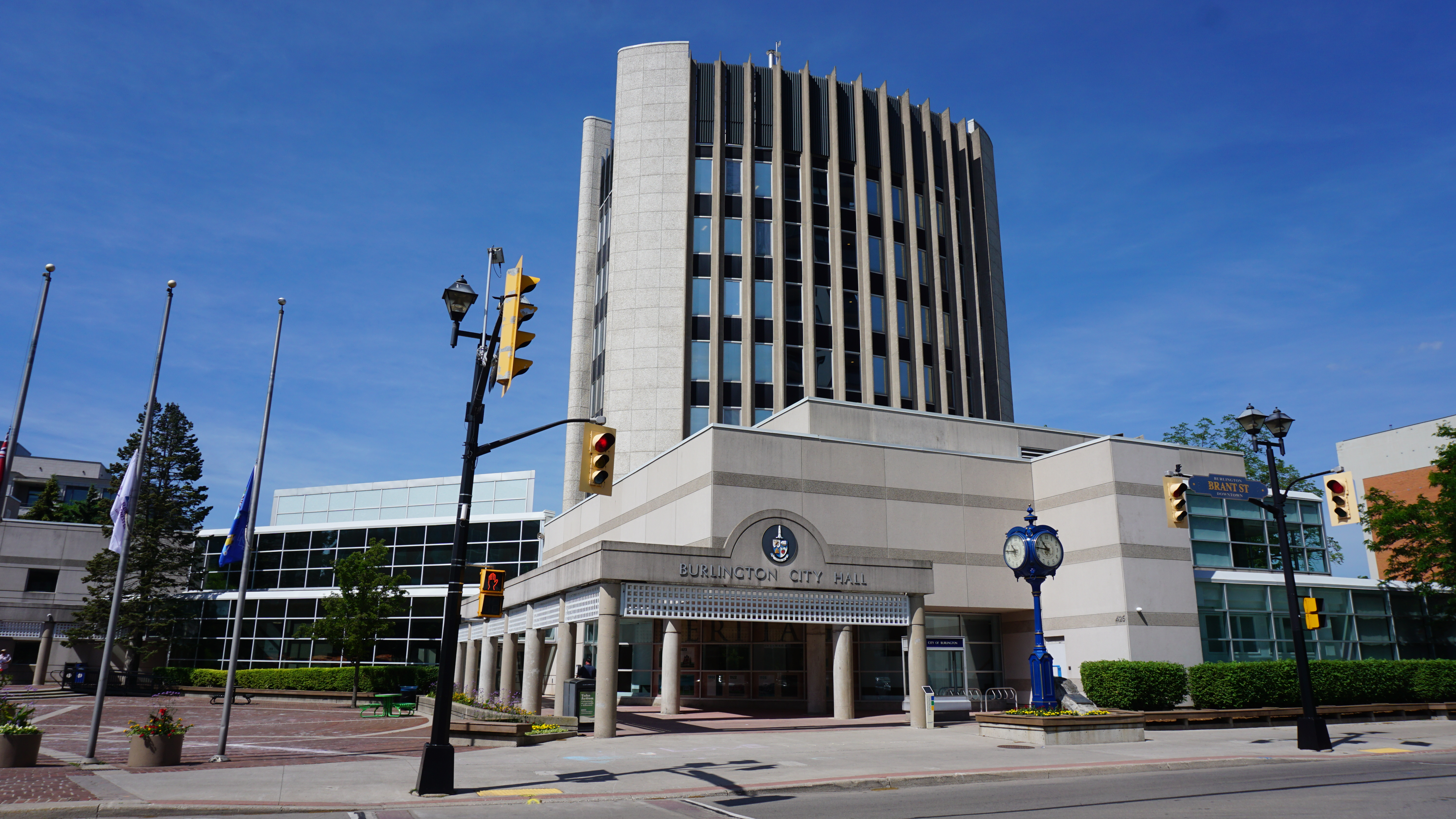
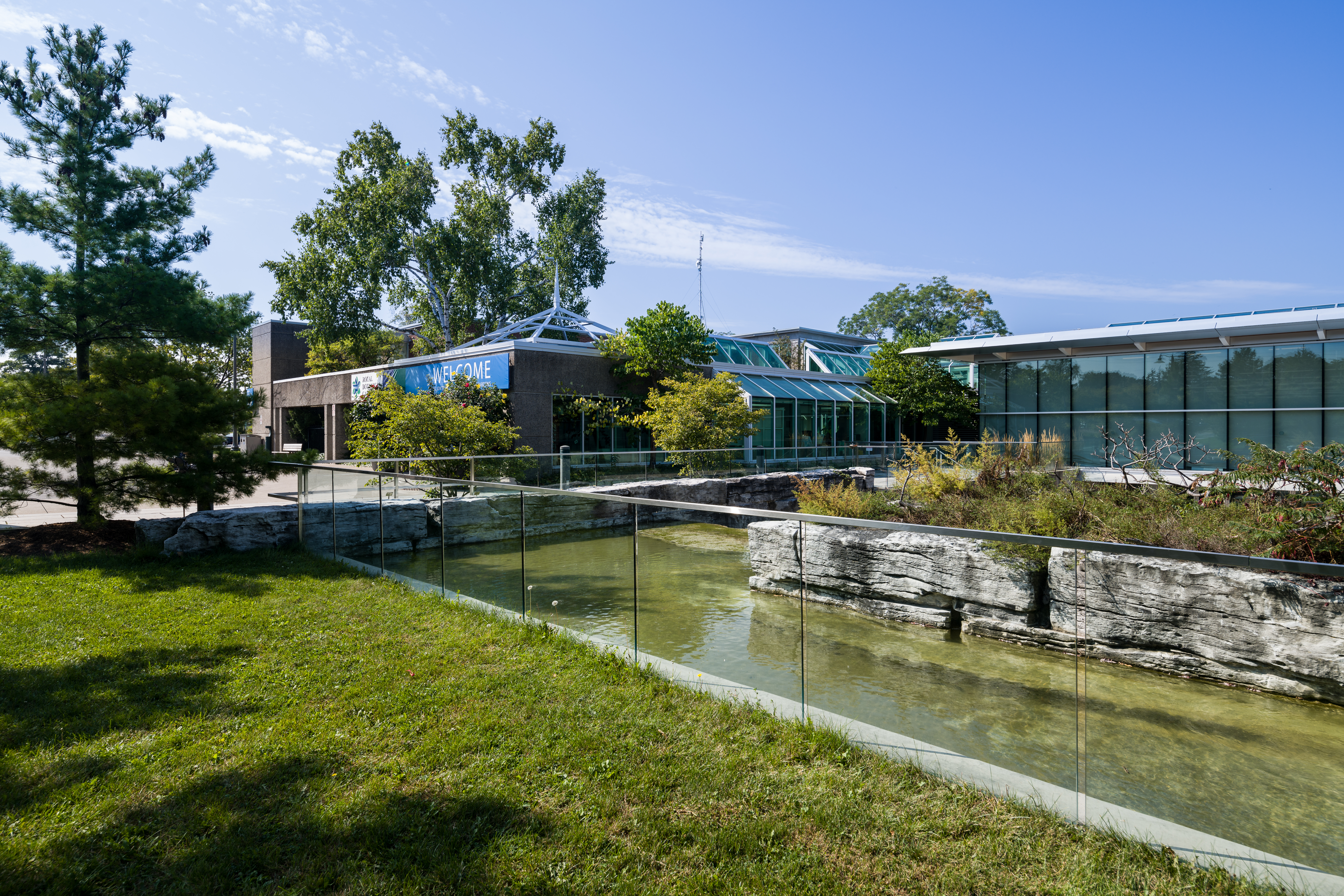
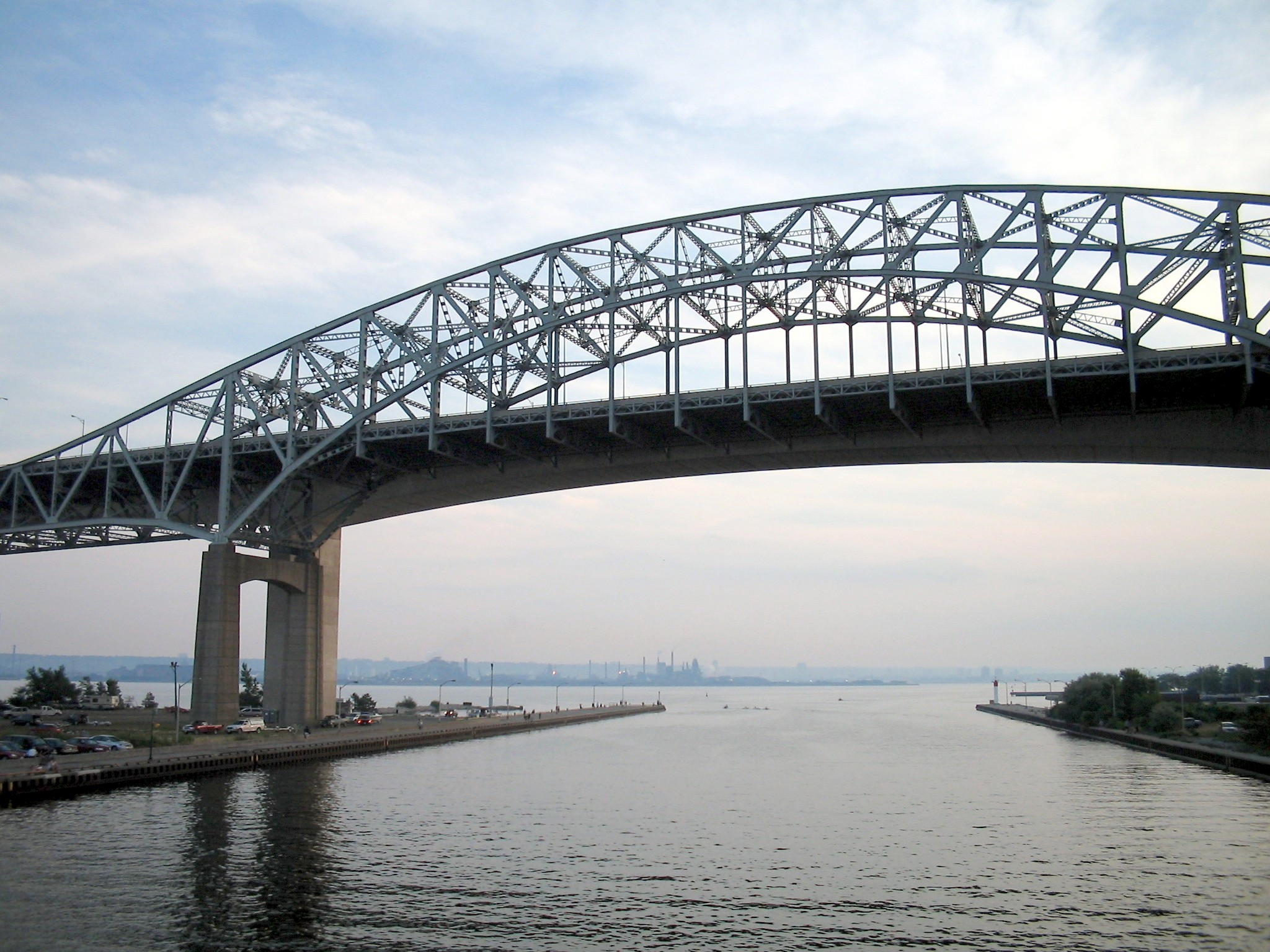
- Aerial view of Burlington with Spencer Smith Park and the Brant Street Pier Downtown Burlington Burlington City Hall Royal Botanical Gardens Burlington Skyway

- Coat of arms Logo
- Motto: Stand By
- Interactive map of Burlington
- Location within Southern Ontario Location within Regional Municipality of Halton
- Coordinates: 43°22′12″N 79°48′51″W
- Country: Canada
- Province: Ontario
- Region: Halton
- Established: 1874
- City status: 1974

Government
  - Mayor: Marianne Meed Ward
  - Governing Body: Burlington City Council
  - MPs: Karina Gould (Lib), Adam van Koeverden (Lib)
  - MPPs: Natalie Pierre (PC), Zee Hamid (PC), Effie Triantafilopoulos (PC)

Area
  - Total: 186.12 km^{2} (71.86 sq mi)
- Elevation: 74 m (243 ft)

Population (2021)
  - Total: 186,948 (Ranked 28th)
  - Density: 1,004.4/km^{2} (2,601/sq mi)
- Demonym(s): Burlingtonian, Burlingtonite
- Time zone: UTC−05:00 (EST)
  - Summer (DST): UTC−04:00 (EDT)
- Forward sortation area: L7L to L7T
- Area codes: 905, 289, 365, and 742
- Highways: Queen Elizabeth Way; Highway 403; Highway 407; Former Highway 2 Former Highway 5
- Website: burlington.ca

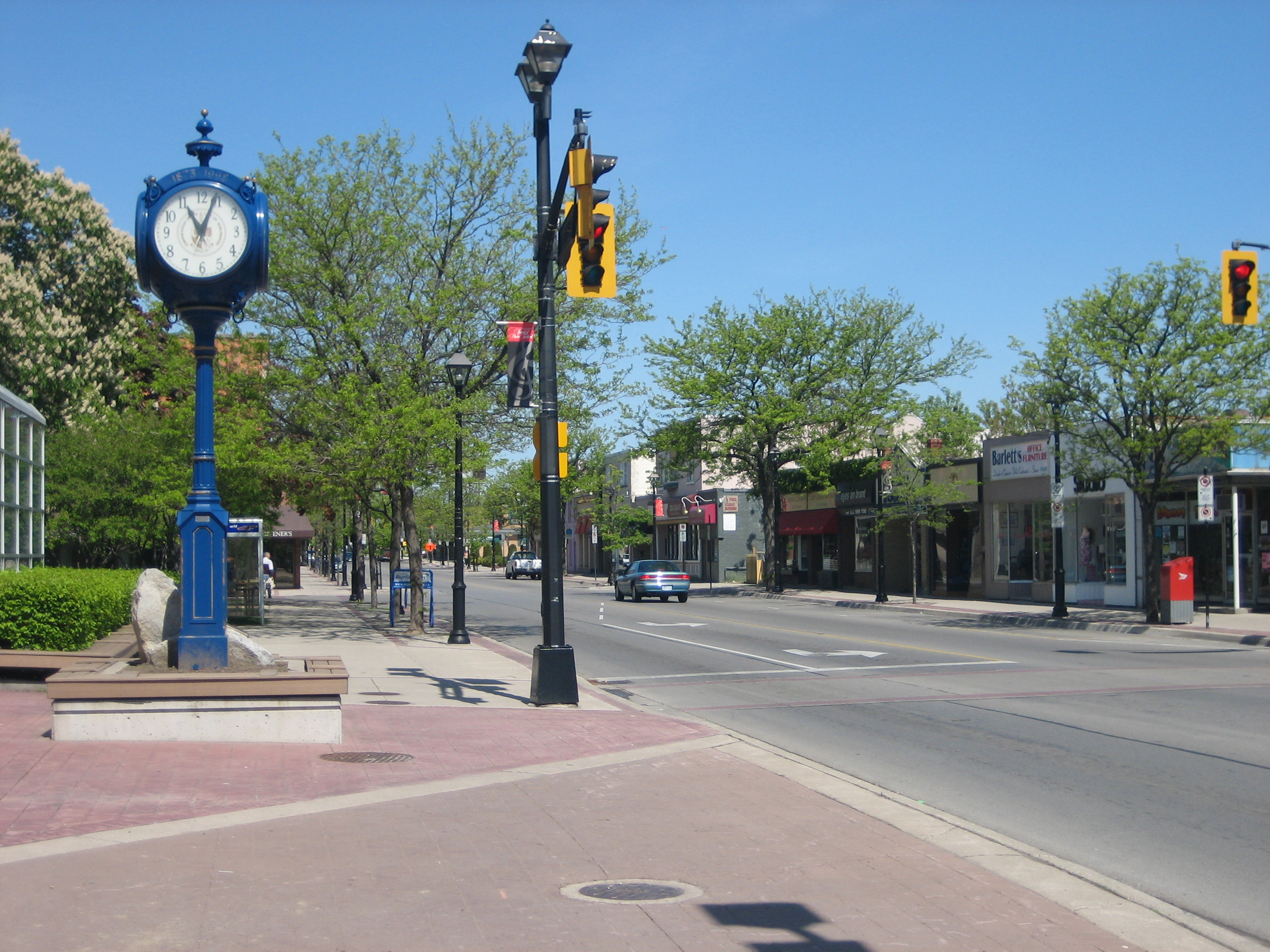
Brant Street in Downtown Burlington (2009)

Burlington is a city at the west end of Lake Ontario in Halton Region, Ontario, Canada. It borders Hamilton to the south, Milton to the northwest, and Oakville to the northeast. It is part of the Greater Toronto Area, the Hamilton census metropolitan area, and the Golden Horseshoe urban region. Burlington was founded in 1874, and gained city status in 1974. With a population of 186,948 as of 2021, Burlington is the twenty-eighth-most populous municipality in Canada.

== History ==
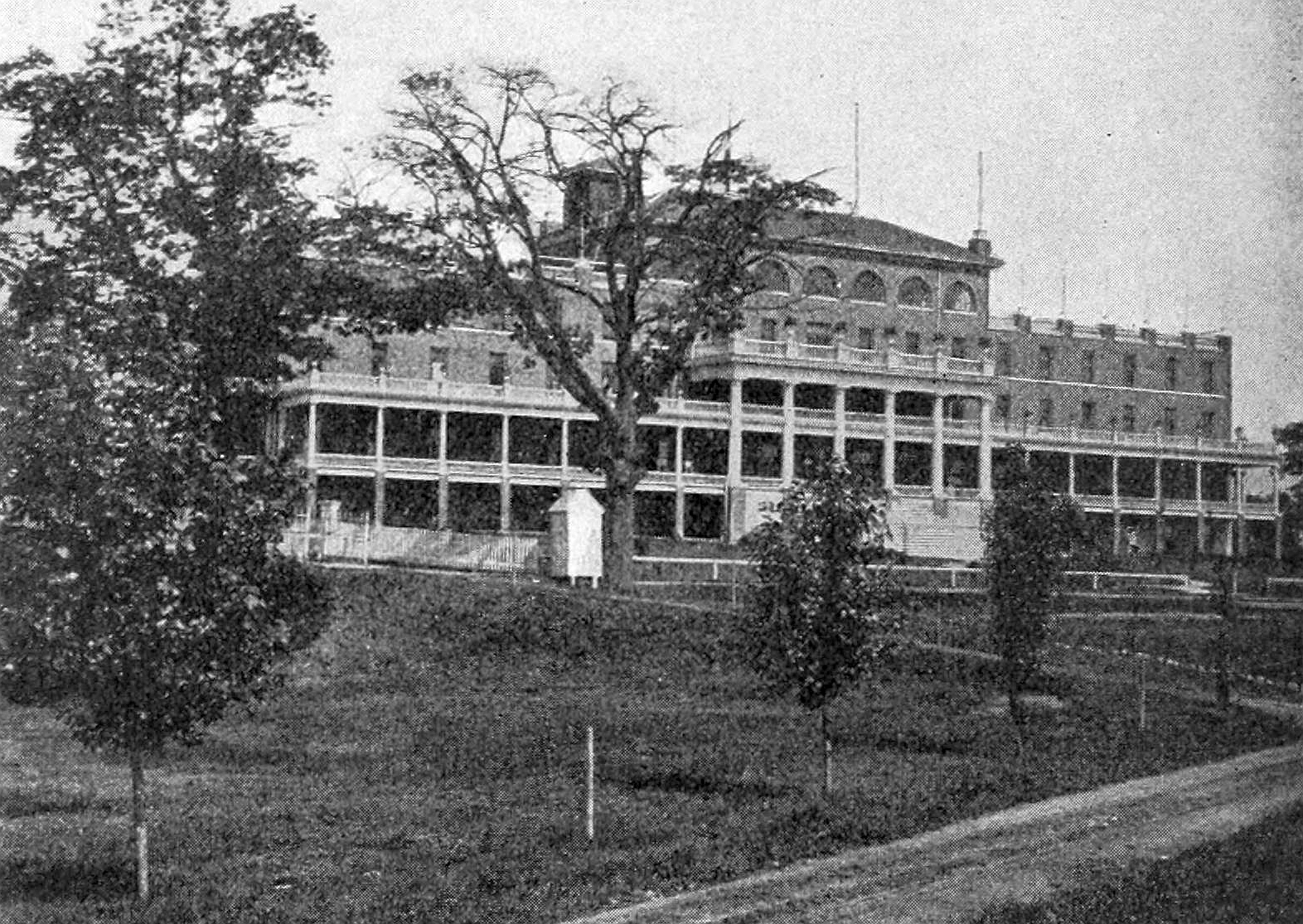
The Brant Hotel in 1902. Located on the shore of Lake Ontario in Burlington, the hotel was erected on the former homestead of Joseph Brant, and was the largest resort in Canada. The hotel was expropriated and used as a military hospital in 1917, demolished and rebuilt in the 1930s, and then demolished in 1964.

Before the 19th century, the land on which Burlington now stands was home to the Mississauga nation. The British purchased the land from the Mississaugas in Upper Canada Treaties 3 (1792), 8 (1797), 14 (1806), and 19 (1818).

In 1792, John Graves Simcoe, the first lieutenant governor of Upper Canada, named the western end of Lake Ontario "Burlington Bay" after the town of Bridlington in the East Riding of Yorkshire, England.

Treaty 8 concerned the purchase of the Brant Tract, 14.0 km^{2} (3,450 acres) on Burlington Bay which the British granted to Mohawk chief Joseph Brant for his service in the American Revolutionary War. Joseph Brant and his household settled on this tract of land around 1802. Brant is accordingly often referred to as the founder of Burlington, and the city still celebrates an annual Joseph Brant Day in early August.

Subsequent disputes between the Mississaugas of the Credit First Nation and the Canadian government over payment for the Brant Tract and the Toronto Purchase were settled in 2010 for the sum of $145 million (CAD).

With the completion of the local survey after the War of 1812, the land was opened for settlement. Early farmers prospered in the Burlington area because the area had fertile soil and moderate temperatures. Produce from the farms was shipped out via the bustling docks of the lakeside villages of Port Nelson and Wellington Square, as well as Brown's Wharf in the nearby village of Port Flamborough (which was to become Aldershot). Lumber taken from the surrounding forests also competed for space on the busy docks. In the latter half of the 19th century, increased wheat production from Western Canada convinced local farmers to switch to fruit and vegetable production.

In 1873, the villages of Wellington Square and Port Nelson merged to become the Village of Burlington which then became the Town of Burlington in 1914. The arrival of large steamships on the Great Lakes made the small docks of the local ports obsolete, and the increased use of railway to ship goods marked the end of the commercial wharves.

Farming still thrived though, and the resultant growth resulted in continued prosperity. By 1906, the town boasted its own newspaper—the Burlington Gazette—as well as a town library and a local rail line that connected Burlington to nearby Hamilton. During the First World War, 300 local men volunteered for duty in the Canadian Expeditionary Force—38 did not return. In 1914, Burlington was incorporated into a town.

As more settlers arrived and cleared the land, cash crops replaced subsistence farming. Gradually, mixed farming and market gardens became the dominant form of agriculture, and in the early 20th century the area was declared the Garden of Canada. The first peaches grown in Canada were cultivated in the Grindstone Creek watershed in the city's south-west part. The farming tradition has passed down through the generations. Today over 40 per cent of the Grindstone Creek watershed is still devoted to farms, orchards and nurseries.

Following the Second World War, cheap electricity from nearby Niagara Falls and better transportation access due to the new (1939) Queen Elizabeth Way encouraged both light industry and families to move to Burlington. The population skyrocketed as new homes were built, encouraging developers to build even more new homes. On January 1, 1958, Burlington officially annexed most of the Township of Nelson, as well as Aldershot, formerly a part of East Flamborough Township. By 1967, the last cash crop farm within the city had been replaced by the Burlington Centre.

Burlington was the site of the Brant Inn built by the lake in 1917, which became famous during the '40s and '50s for showing big-band performers.

By 1974, with a population exceeding 100,000, Burlington was incorporated as a city. The extremely high rate of growth continued, and between 2001 and 2006, the population of Burlington grew by 9%, compared to Canada's overall growth rate of 5.4%. By 2006, the population topped 160,000.

== Geography ==
Burlington is at the southwestern end of Lake Ontario, just to the north east of Hamilton and the Niagara Peninsula, roughly in the geographic centre of the urban corridor known as the Golden Horseshoe. Burlington has a land area of 187 km^{2} (72 sq mi). The main urban area is south of the Parkway Belt and Highway 407. The land north of this, and north Aldershot is used primarily for agriculture, rural residential and conservation purposes. The Niagara Escarpment, Lake Ontario and the sloping plain between the escarpment and the lake make up the land area of Burlington. The city is no longer a port; sailing vessels in the area are used for recreational purposes and moor at a 215 slip marina in LaSalle Park.

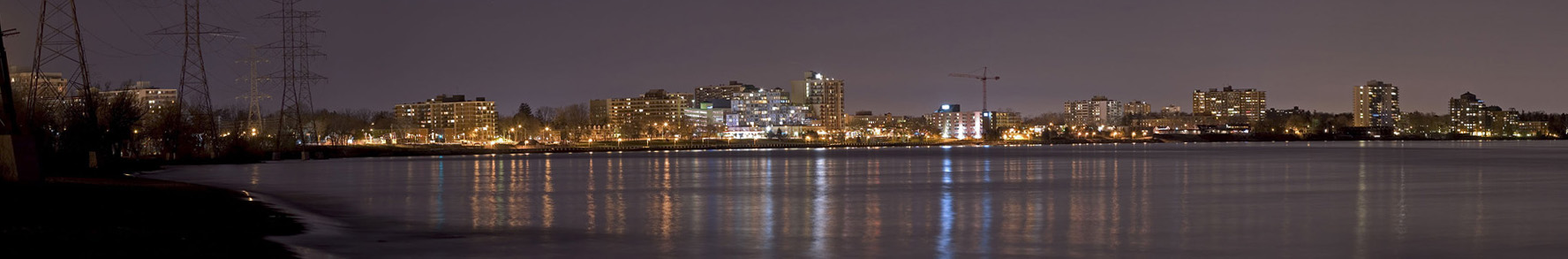
Burlington at night

=== Climate ===
Burlington's climate is humid continental (Köppen climate classification Dfa) with warm to hot, humid summers and cold, occasionally snowy winters. The climate is moderated somewhat by its proximity to Lake Ontario. Monthly mean temperatures range from 22.5 °C (72.5 °F) in July to −4.4 °C (24.1 °F) in January. The average annual precipitation is 763 mm (30.0 in) of rain and 99 cm (39 in) of snow.

Although it shares the continental climate found in Southern Ontario, its proximity to the lake moderates winter temperatures, and it also benefits from a sheltering effect of the Niagara Escarpment, allowing the most northerly tracts of Carolinian forest to thrive on the Escarpment that runs through western sections of city. Several species of flora and fauna usually found only in more southern climes are present in Burlington, including paw-paw (Asimina triloba), green dragon (Arisaema dracontium), tuckahoe (Peltandra virginica), American columbo (Frasera caroliniensis), wall-rue (Asplenium ruta-muraria), plus the Louisiana waterthrush, hooded warbler, southern flying squirrel and rare eastern pipistrelle bat. Near the visible promontory of Mount Nemo that rises some 200 m (650 ft) above the lake level, a "vertical forest" of white cedar clinging to the Escarpment face includes many small trees that are more than one thousand years old.

Hamilton Harbour, the western end of Lake Ontario, is bounded on its western shore by a large sandbar, now called the Beach strip, that was deposited during the last ice age. A canal bisecting the sandbar allows ships access to the harbour. The Burlington Bay James N. Allan Skyway (part of the Queen Elizabeth Way), and the Canal Lift Bridge allow access over the canal.

Climate data for Burlington TS Climate ID: 6151064; coordinates 43°20′N 79°50′W, elevation: 99.1 m (325 ft); 1981–2010 normals, extremes 1866–present (Note: Long term records have been recorded at various climate stations in or nearby Burlington since 1866)
Month	Jan	Feb	Mar	Apr	May	Jun	Jul	Aug	Sep	Oct	Nov	Dec	Year
Record high °C (°F)	18.4 (65.1)	17.9 (64.2)	27.2 (81.0)	32.0 (89.6)	36.1 (97.0)	38.9 (102.0)	41.1 (106.0)	38.3 (100.9)	37.8 (100.0)	31.1 (88.0)	26.7 (80.1)	22.0 (71.6)	41.1 (106.0)
Mean daily maximum °C (°F)	−0.6 (30.9)	0.8 (33.4)	5.2 (41.4)	12.4 (54.3)	19.4 (66.9)	25.0 (77.0)	28.0 (82.4)	26.7 (80.1)	21.8 (71.2)	15.1 (59.2)	8.0 (46.4)	2.4 (36.3)	13.7 (56.7)
Daily mean °C (°F)	−4.4 (24.1)	−3.2 (26.2)	1.0 (33.8)	7.5 (45.5)	13.9 (57.0)	19.4 (66.9)	22.5 (72.5)	21.4 (70.5)	16.9 (62.4)	10.4 (50.7)	4.4 (39.9)	−1 (30)	9.1 (48.4)
Mean daily minimum °C (°F)	−8.1 (17.4)	−7.1 (19.2)	−3.3 (26.1)	2.6 (36.7)	8.3 (46.9)	13.8 (56.8)	16.9 (62.4)	16.1 (61.0)	11.9 (53.4)	5.7 (42.3)	0.7 (33.3)	−4.3 (24.3)	4.4 (39.9)
Record low °C (°F)	−30.6 (−23.1)	−29.4 (−20.9)	−27.2 (−17.0)	−14.4 (6.1)	−7.2 (19.0)	0.0 (32.0)	1.1 (34.0)	1.7 (35.1)	−3.9 (25.0)	−11.1 (12.0)	−22.8 (−9.0)	−27.8 (−18.0)	−30.6 (−23.1)
Average precipitation mm (inches)	66.0 (2.60)	54.5 (2.15)	61.6 (2.43)	70.6 (2.78)	81.0 (3.19)	69.1 (2.72)	75.3 (2.96)	82.0 (3.23)	83.1 (3.27)	71.9 (2.83)	84.9 (3.34)	63.0 (2.48)	863.1 (33.98)
Average rainfall mm (inches)	31.8 (1.25)	33.0 (1.30)	44.7 (1.76)	68.2 (2.69)	81.0 (3.19)	69.1 (2.72)	75.3 (2.96)	82.0 (3.23)	83.1 (3.27)	71.9 (2.83)	79.7 (3.14)	43.5 (1.71)	763.3 (30.05)
Average snowfall cm (inches)	34.2 (13.5)	21.5 (8.5)	16.9 (6.7)	2.4 (0.9)	0.0 (0.0)	0.0 (0.0)	0.0 (0.0)	0.0 (0.0)	0.0 (0.0)	0.0 (0.0)	5.3 (2.1)	19.5 (7.7)	99.9 (39.3)
Average precipitation days (≥ 0.2 mm)	12.4	9.6	11.0	12.5	11.8	10.9	10.1	10.2	10.9	10.7	13.9	11.9	135.8
Average rainy days (≥ 0.2 mm)	4.9	4.5	8.0	11.7	11.8	10.9	10.1	10.2	10.9	10.7	12.7	7.7	113.9
Average snowy days (≥ 0.2 cm)	8.1	6.0	3.6	0.84	0.0	0.0	0.0	0.0	0.0	0.0	1.6	5.4	25.5
Source: Environment and Climate Change Canada

== Demographics ==
Burlington
Year	Pop.	±%
1901	1,119	—
1911	1,831	+63.6%
1921	2,709	+48.0%
1931	3,046	+12.4%
1941	3,815	+25.2%
1951	6,017	+57.7%
1961	47,008	+681.3%
1971	87,023	+85.1%
1981	114,853	+32.0%
1991	129,575	+12.8%
1996	136,976	+5.7%
2001	150,836	+10.1%
2006	164,415	+9.0%
2011	175,779	+6.9%
2016	183,314	+4.3%
2021	186,948	+2.0%

In the 2021 Census of Population conducted by Statistics Canada, Burlington had a population of 186,948 living in 73,180 of its 74,891 total private dwellings, a change of 2% from its 2016 population of 183,314. With a land area of 186.12 km^{2} (71.86 sq mi), it had a population density of 1,004.4/km^{2} (2,601.5/sq mi) in 2021.

According to the 2016 census, Burlington's population was 183,314 where 48% of residents were male and 52% female. Minors (individuals up to the age of 19) made up 22.6% of the population (almost identical to the national average of 22.4%), and seniors (age 65+) were 19.2% (higher than the national average of 16.9%). This older population was also reflected in Burlington's median age of 43.3, which was higher than the Canadian median of 41.2.

=== Religion ===
According to the 2021 census, 58.3% of Burlington residents identify as Christian, with Catholics (29.4%) making up the largest denomination, followed by Anglican (5.8%), United Church (5.2%), and other denominations. Others identify as Muslim (4.3%), Sikh (2.3%), Hindu (1.1%), Buddhist (0.6%), Jewish (0.4%), and with other religions. A total of 32.4% of the population report no religious affiliation.

=== Language ===
According to the 2016 census, the most common mother tongue in Burlington is English (78.7%), followed by French (1.6%), Spanish (1.5%), Polish (1.3%), and Arabic (1.2). The three most commonly known languages are English (99.1%), French (9%), and Spanish (2.5%).

Mother tongue	Population	%
English	142,605	78.7
French	2,970	1.6
Spanish	2,680	1.5
Polish	2,365	1.3
Arabic	2,205	1.2
Italian	1,845	1.0
Punjabi	1,795	1.0
German	1,645	0.9
Mandarin	1,555	0.9
Portuguese	1,545	0.9
Tagalog (Filipino)	1,290	0.7
Dutch	1,080	0.6

Knowledge of language	Population	%
English	178,540	99.1
French	16,140	9.0
Spanish	4,455	2.5
Polish	2,920	1.6
Italian	2,865	1.6
Arabic	2,750	1.5
German	2,685	1.5
Punjabi	2,565	1.4
Hindi	2,055	1.1
Portuguese	2,040	1.1
Mandarin	1,990	1.1
Tagalog (Filipino)	1,830	1.0

=== Ethnicity ===
Ethnic origin	Population	%
English	56,130	31.2
Canadian	42,935	23.8
Scottish	40,050	22.2
Irish	37,160	20.6
German	18,645	10.4
French	16,585	9.2
Italian	14,235	7.9
Polish	10,475	5.8
Dutch	9,115	5.1
Ukrainian	8,160	4.5
East Indian	7,245	4.0

The 2021 census records a visible minority of 20.9%.

The top 11 ethnic origins from the 2016 census are listed in the accompanying table. Percentages add up to more than 100% because respondents can report more than one ethnicity.

Panethnic groups in the City of Burlington (2001−2021)
Panethnic group	2021		2016		2011		2006		2001	
Panethnic group	Pop.	%	Pop.	%	Pop.	%	Pop.	%	Pop.	%
European (Note: Statistic includes all persons that did not make up part of a visible minority or an indigenous identity.)	143,180	77.83%	149,320	82.9%	151,195	87.15%	145,720	89.68%	137,575	91.88%
South Asian	11,955	6.5%	8,695	4.83%	6,325	3.65%	5,030	3.1%	3,235	2.16%
East Asian (Note: Statistic includes total responses of "Chinese", "Korean", and "Japanese" under visible minority section on census.)	6,295	3.42%	5,160	2.86%	4,175	2.41%	3,280	2.02%	2,335	1.56%
Middle Eastern (Note: Statistic includes total responses of "West Asian" and "Arab" under visible minority section on census.)	5,510	3%	3,495	1.94%	2,385	1.37%	1,555	0.96%	1,075	0.72%
African	4,670	2.54%	3,795	2.11%	2,830	1.63%	2,450	1.51%	2,305	1.54%
Southeast Asian (Note: Statistic includes total responses of "Filipino" and "Southeast Asian" under visible minority section on census.)	4,075	2.22%	3,520	1.95%	2,270	1.31%	1,550	0.95%	890	0.59%
Latin American	3,205	1.74%	2,325	1.29%	1,660	0.96%	1,135	0.7%	665	0.44%
Indigenous	2,385	1.3%	1,970	1.09%	1,510	0.87%	1,070	0.66%	905	0.6%
Other/Multiracial (Note: Statistic includes total responses of "Visible minority, n.i.e." and "Multiple visible minorities" under visible minority section on census.)	2,680	1.46%	1,835	1.02%	1,135	0.65%	685	0.42%	755	0.5%
Total responses	183,955	98.4%	180,125	98.26%	173,490	98.7%	162,480	98.82%	149,735	99.27%
Total population	186,948	100%	183,314	100%	175,779	100%	164,415	100%	150,836	100%
Note: Totals greater than 100% due to multiple origin responses

== Economy ==
Burlington's economic strength is the diversity of its economic base, mainly achieved because of its geography, proximity to large industries in southern Ontario (Canada's largest consumer market), its location within the Greater Toronto and Hamilton Area (GTHA) and proximity to Hamilton, and its transportation infrastructure including the Port of Hamilton on Burlington Bay. This diversity has allowed for sustained growth with regards to the economy. The city has a robust economy with potential for growth—it is at the hub of the Golden Horseshoe, is largely driven by both the automotive and manufacturing sectors.

No single employer or job sector dominates Burlington's economy. The leading industrial sectors, in terms of employment, are food processing, packaging, electronics, motor vehicle/transportation, business services, chemical/pharmaceutical and environmental. The top five private sector employers in Burlington are Fearmans Pork Inc, Cogeco Cable, Evertz Microsystems, Boehringer Ingelheim and EMC2. Other notable business include The EBF Group, ARGO Land Development, The Sunshine Doughnut Company and TipTapPay Micropayments Ltd. The largest public sector employers in the city are the City of Burlington, Burlington Economic Development, the Halton District School Board, the Halton Catholic District School Board and Joseph Brant Hospital.

Burlington Centre and Mapleview Centre are popular malls within the city. The city's summer festivals include Canada's Largest Ribfest, and the Burlington Sound of Music Festival which also attract many visitors.

== Arts and culture ==
=== Organizations ===
The Burlington Teen Tour Band has operated in the city since 1947, including members between the ages of 13 and 21. The marching band are regular participants in major international parades. They are also referred to as "Canada's Musical Ambassadors" and have represented Canada all over the world. One such occasion was during the 2018 Tournament of Roses Parade, where the band represented Canada for the fifth time in the band's history. The band is led by Jeff Thomblison, managing director. In 2019, the band performed on Juno Beach for the 75th anniversary of D-Day and returned in 2024 for the 80th anniversary.

The Junior Redcoats are the younger version of the Teen Tour Band. The band includes children between the ages of 9 and 12. They are directed by Caroline Singh.

The Burlington Concert Band (BCB) is the oldest band in Burlington and has been in operation since 1908. It is composed of local volunteer musicians, and plays a wide variety of musical styles and repertoire. The band's main goal is to raise money for local charities and organizations. The BCB maintains an open membership policy, allowing anyone who feels they can handle the music competently to join without an audition. The BCB is led by an elected volunteer board. The current musical director is Joanne Romanow.

The Burlington Symphony Orchestra, formed in 1973, is a community orchestra under the direction of Denis Mastromonaco.

== Attractions ==
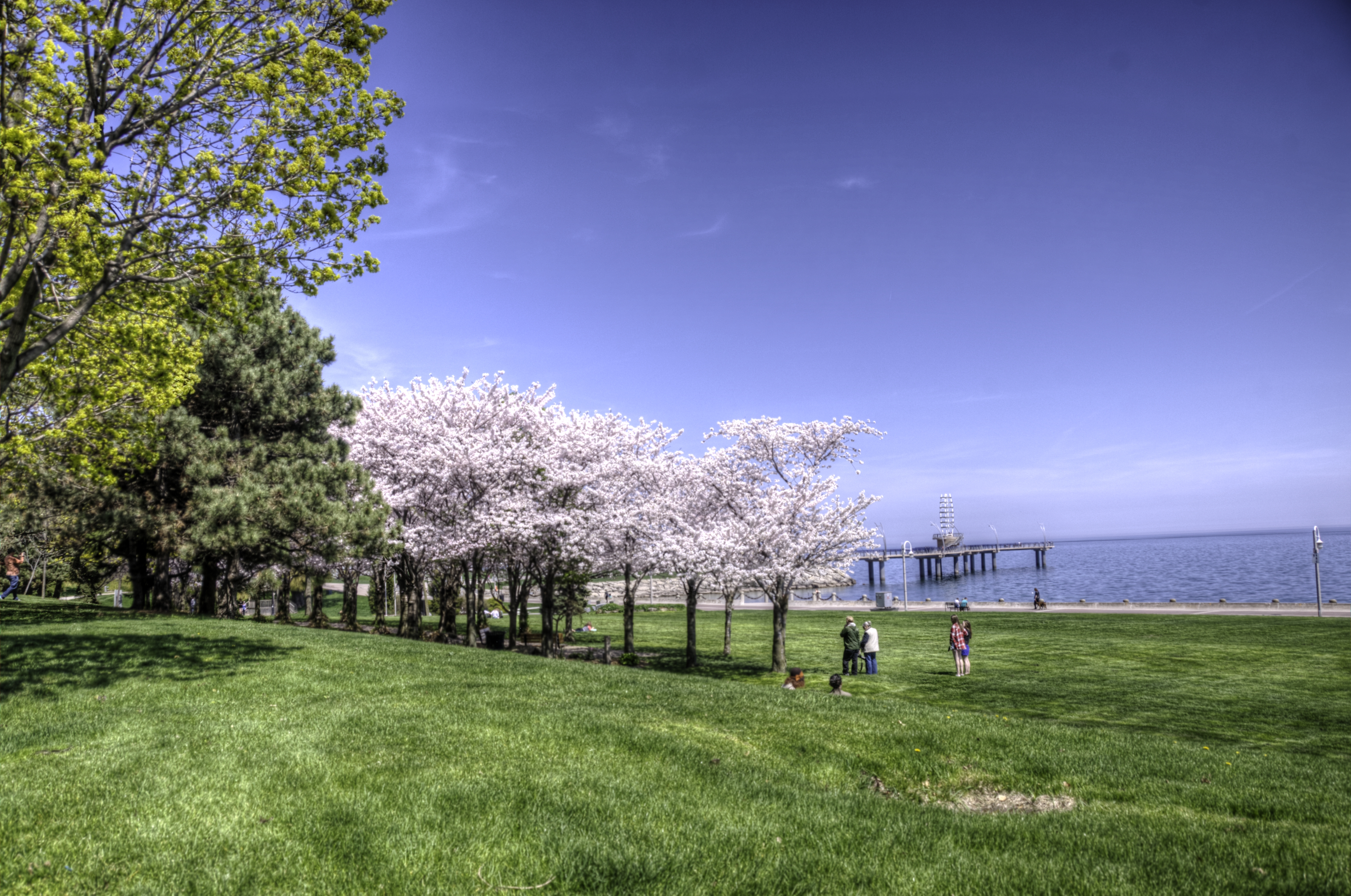
Spencer Smith Park on Burlington's waterfront

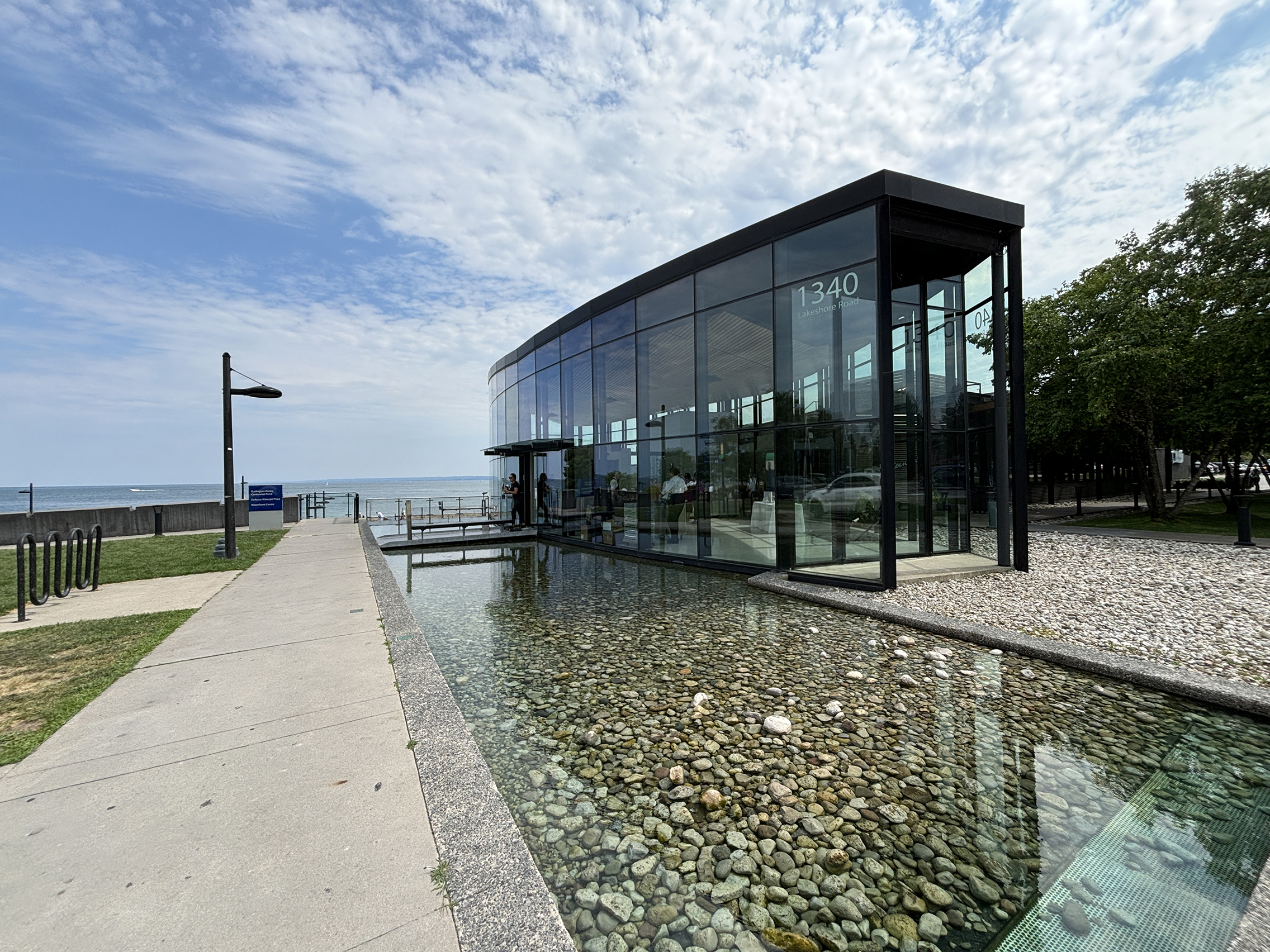
Spencer's At The Waterfront

There are 115 parks and 580 hectares (1,400 acres) of parkland in the city. On the shore of Lake Ontario, Spencer Smith Park features a shoreline walking path, an observatory, water jet play area and restaurant. The park includes the Burlington Rotary Centennial Pond, used for model sail boating and ice-skating. Festivals in Spencer Smith Park include Ribfest, the Sound of Music Festival, Canada Day, Children's Festival and Lakeside Festival of Lights.

The Brant Street Pier opened in Spencer Smith Park during the Sound of Music Festival in 2013.

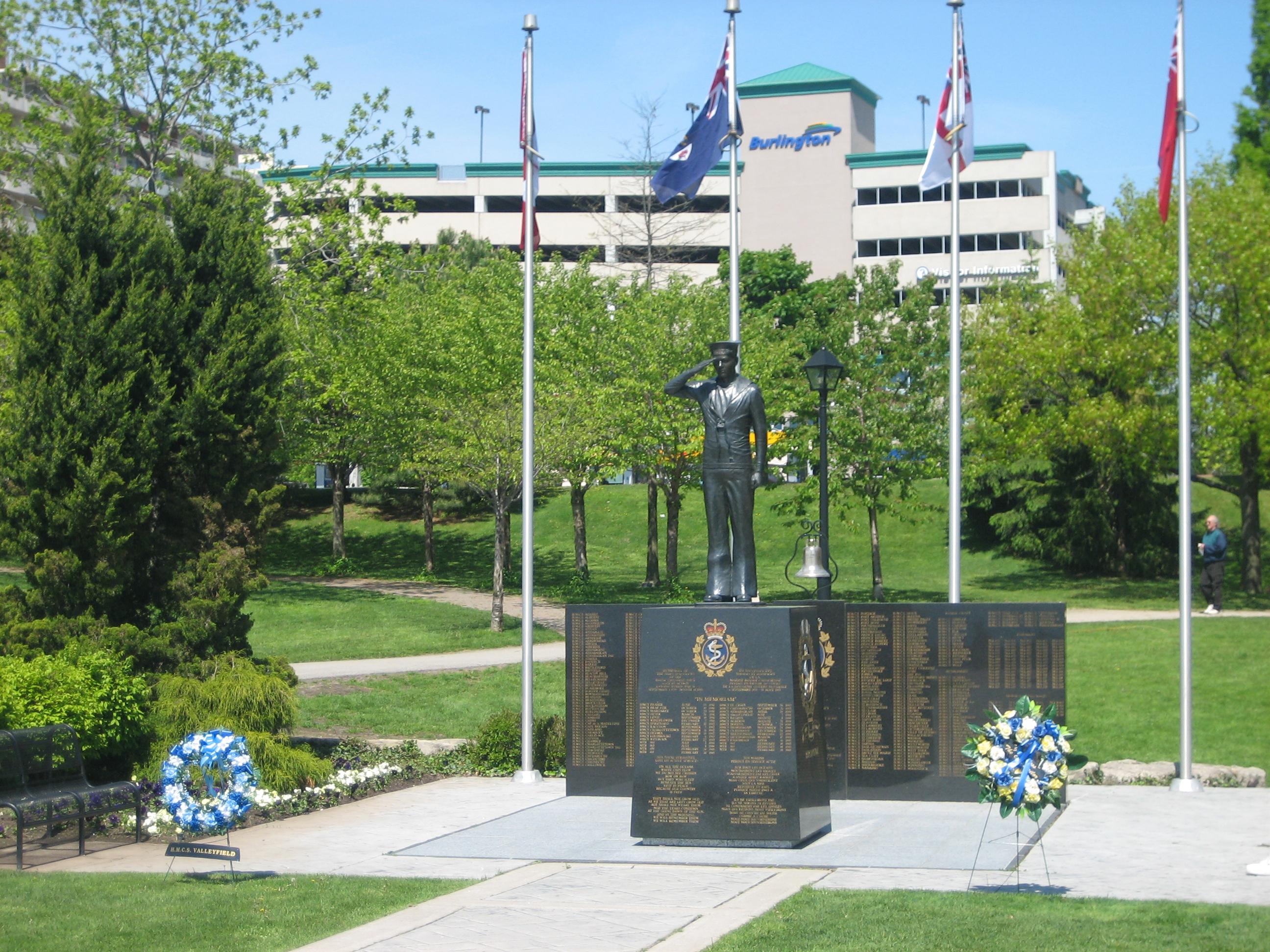
"Royal Canadian Naval Association Naval Memorial" (1995) by André Gauthier, Spencer Smith Park

The Art Gallery of Burlington contains permanent and temporary exhibits.

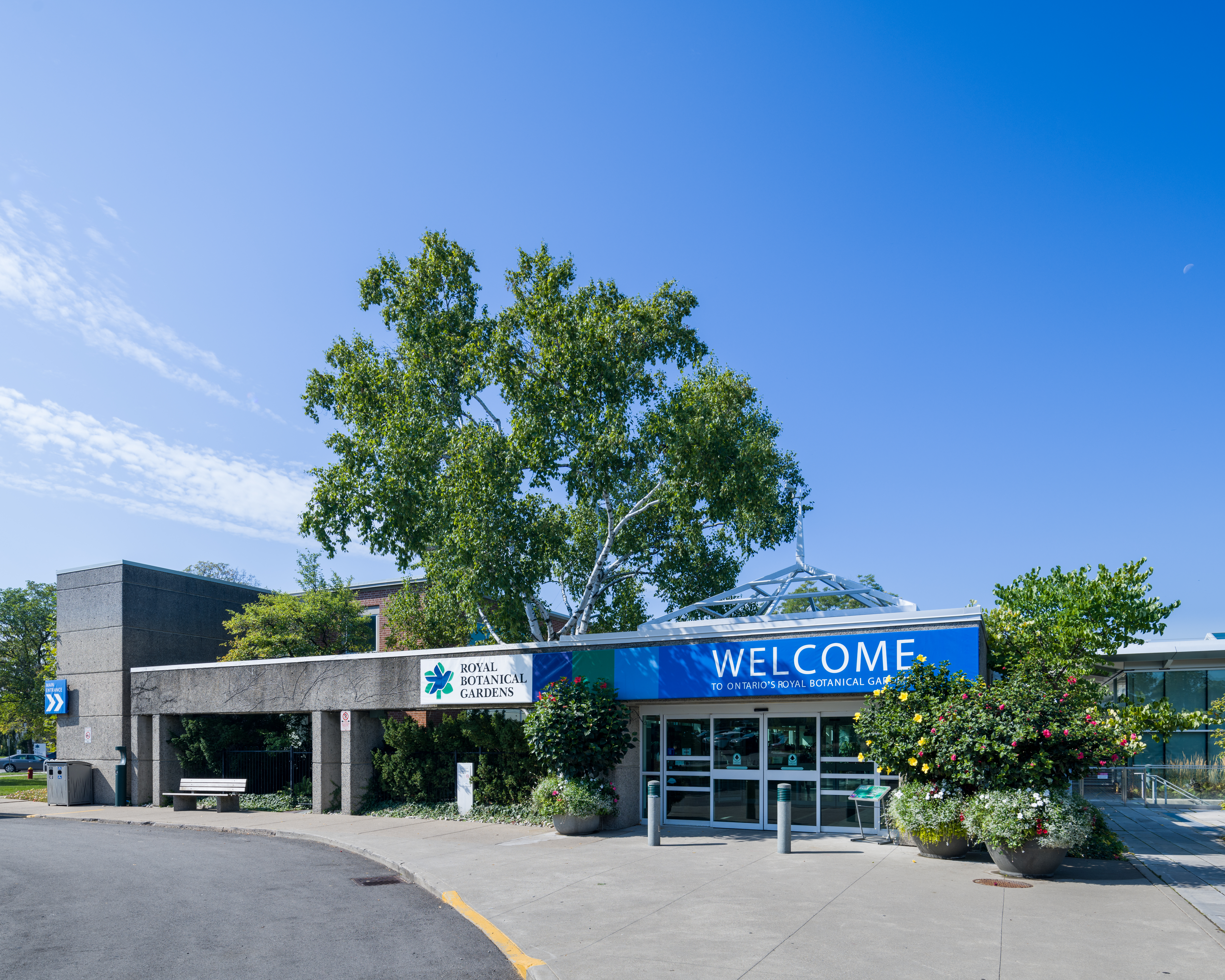
Royal Botanical Gardens

"Royal Canadian Naval Association Naval Memorial" (1995), by André Gauthier, is a 1.93 m (6 ft 4 in) high cast bronze statue of a World War II Canadian sailor in Spencer Smith Park.

The Royal Botanical Gardens in Burlington is the largest botanical garden in Canada. Ontario's botanical garden and National Historic Site of Canada features over 11 km^{2} (2,700 acres) of gardens and nature sanctuaries, including four outdoor display gardens, the Mediterranean Garden under glass, three on-site restaurants, the Gardens' Gift Shop, and festivals.

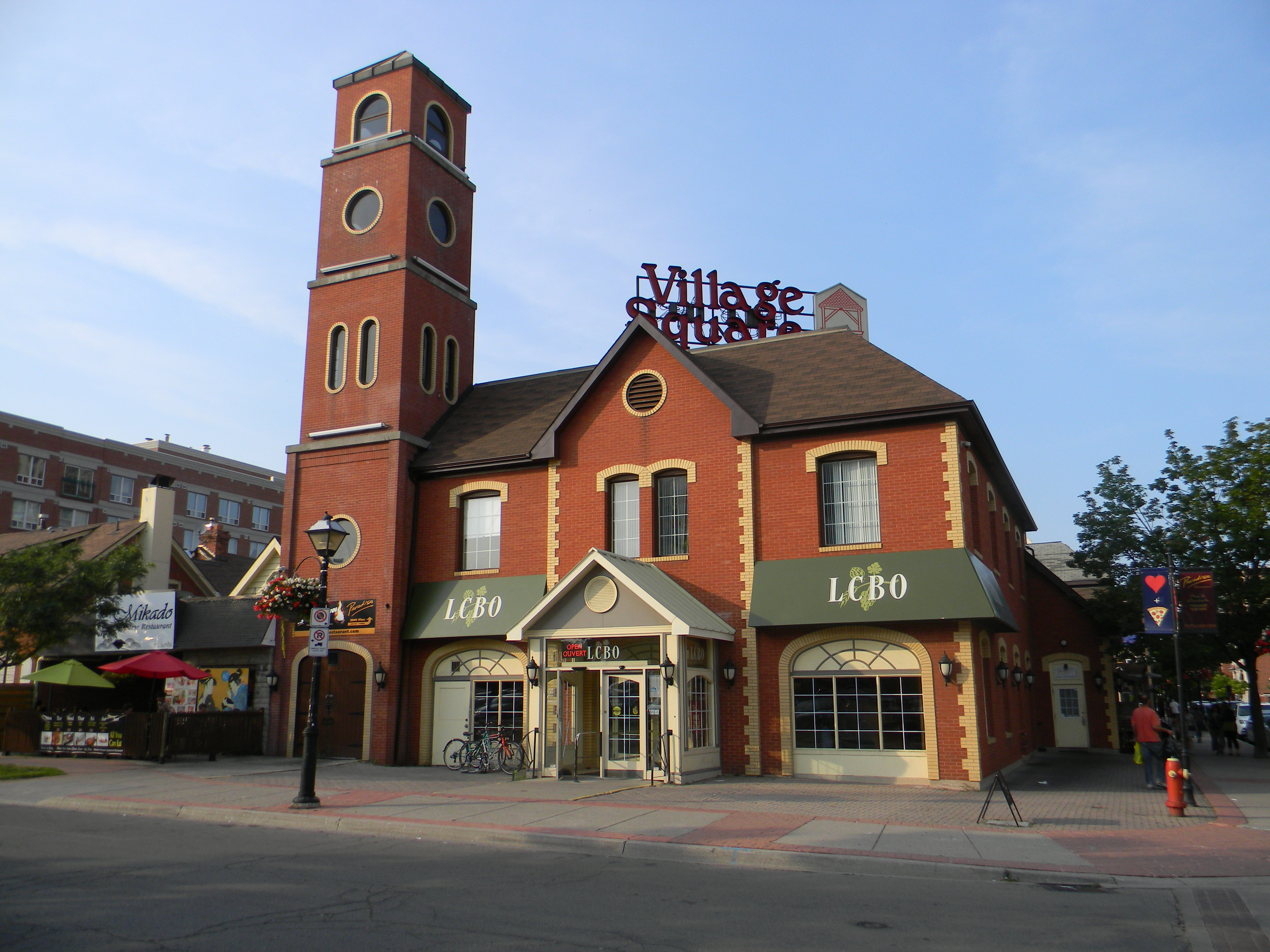
An LCBO outlet housed in a former firehall at The Village Square

Located at The Village Square in Burlington's downtown are historic landmarks, businesses, shopping, and dining area.

Mount Nemo Conservation Area is operated by Conservation Halton. Bronte Creek Provincial Park features a campground and recreational activities.

The local sections of the Bruce Trail and the Niagara Escarpment, which is a UNESCO designated World Biosphere Reserve, provide hiking trails. Kerncliff Park, in a decommissioned quarry on the boundary with Waterdown, is a naturalized area on the lip of the Niagara Escarpment. The Bruce Trail runs through the park, at many points running along the edge of the cliffs, providing an overlook.

The Joseph Brant Museum has exhibits on the history of Burlington, the Eileen Collard Costume Collection, Captain Joseph Brant and the visible storage gallery. Ireland House at Oakridge Farm is a museum depicting family life from the 1850s to the 1920s. Freeman Station (1906) of the Grand Trunk Railway, reopened as an interpretive centre in 2017, but temporarily closed in 2023 because the building could not receive an occupancy permit without certain upgrades.

Burlington offers four indoor and two outdoor pools, one splash park, nine splash pads, seven arenas and ice centres, six community centres and nine golf courses. The Appleby Ice Centre is a 4-pad arena, used year-round for skating and ice hockey.

The Burlington Performing Arts Centre, opened in 2011. It offers a 718-seat Main Stage, and a 148-seat Community Studio Theatre. The main stage offers a six-storey fly tower, and an orchestra pit. The Community Studio Theatre was designed as a Black Box Space, to accommodate rehearsals, recitals, meetings, and exhibits.

=== Malls and shopping ===
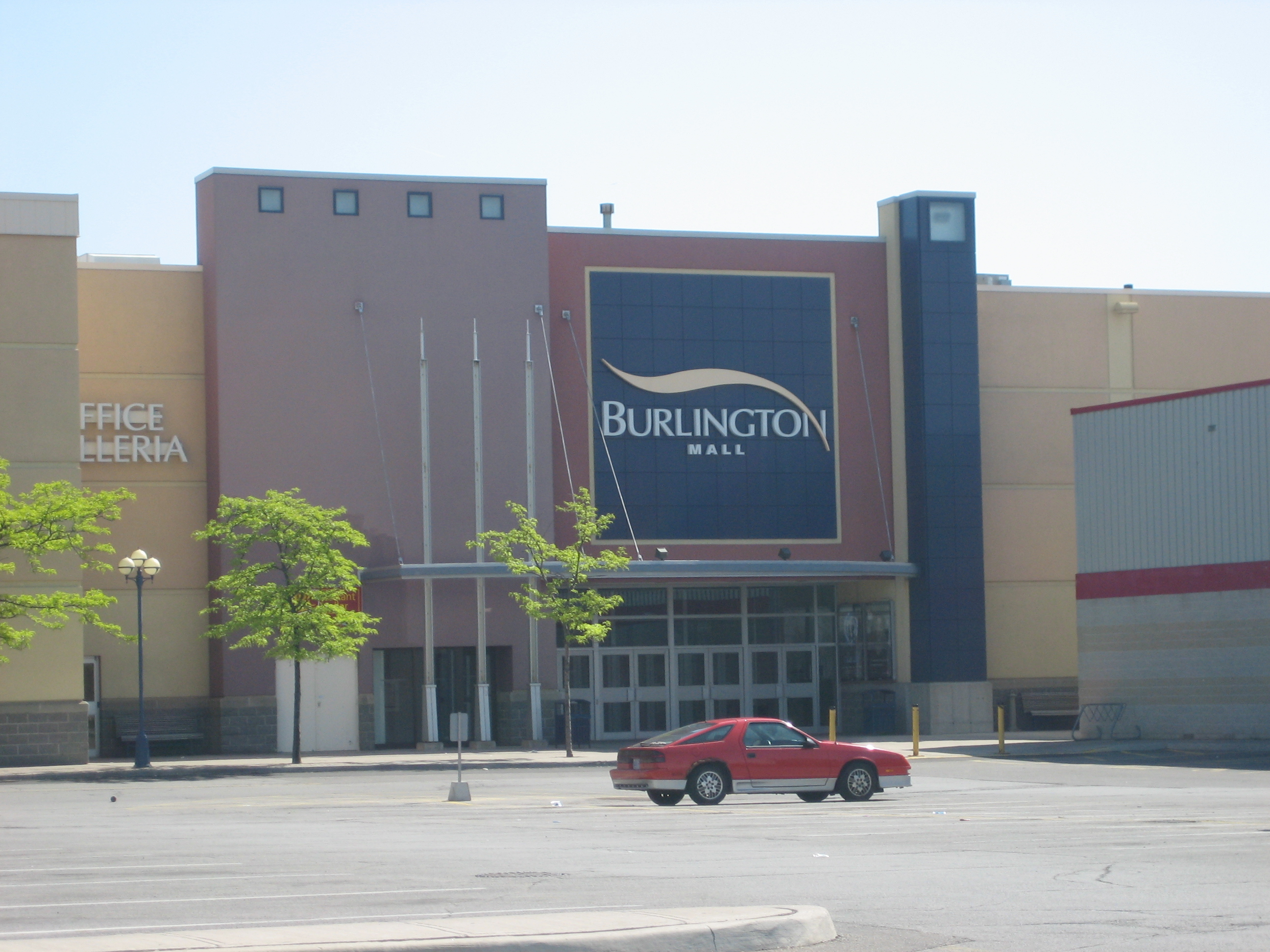
Burlington Mall (Now Burlington Centre)

Burlington Centre is a two-storey mall opened in 1968, and Mapleview Centre is a two-storey mall opened in 1990.

== Sports ==
Burlington doesn't host any professional teams, though several minor league teams are based in the city.

Club	Sport	League / Association	Venue
Burlington Cougars	Ice hockey	Ontario Junior Hockey League	Appleby Ice Centre
Burlington Blaze	Box lacrosse	Ontario Junior A Lacrosse League	Central Arena
Burlington Jr. Barracudas	Ice hockey	Provincial Women's Hockey League	Mainway Ice Centre
Halton United	Soccer	Canadian Soccer League	Norton Park
Burlington SC	Soccer	League1 Ontario	
Burlington Eagles	Ice hockey	Ontario Minor Hockey Association	
Burlington Bayhawks	Soccer	League1 Ontario	
NEXXICE	Synchronized skating	Burlington Skating Club, Kitchener Waterloo Skating Club	
Burlington Track and Field Club	Track and Field	Minor Track Association of Ontario, Athletics Ontario	La Salle Park (fall), Tansley Woods Community Centre (winter), Nelson High School (spring and summer)

=== International competition ===
Burlington, Ontario, founded the Burlington International Games (B.I.G.). The games were first held in 1969 "to offer an athletic and cultural exchange experience for the youth of Burlington". Until recently, the games took place between Burlington, Ontario, and Burlington, Vermont, United States. But, other cities from places such as Quebec, Japan, the Netherlands, and the U.S. have all had athletes compete since 1998. The games celebrated their 40th anniversary in 2009 and the competition ceased in 2010 due to limited participation in later years.

== Government ==
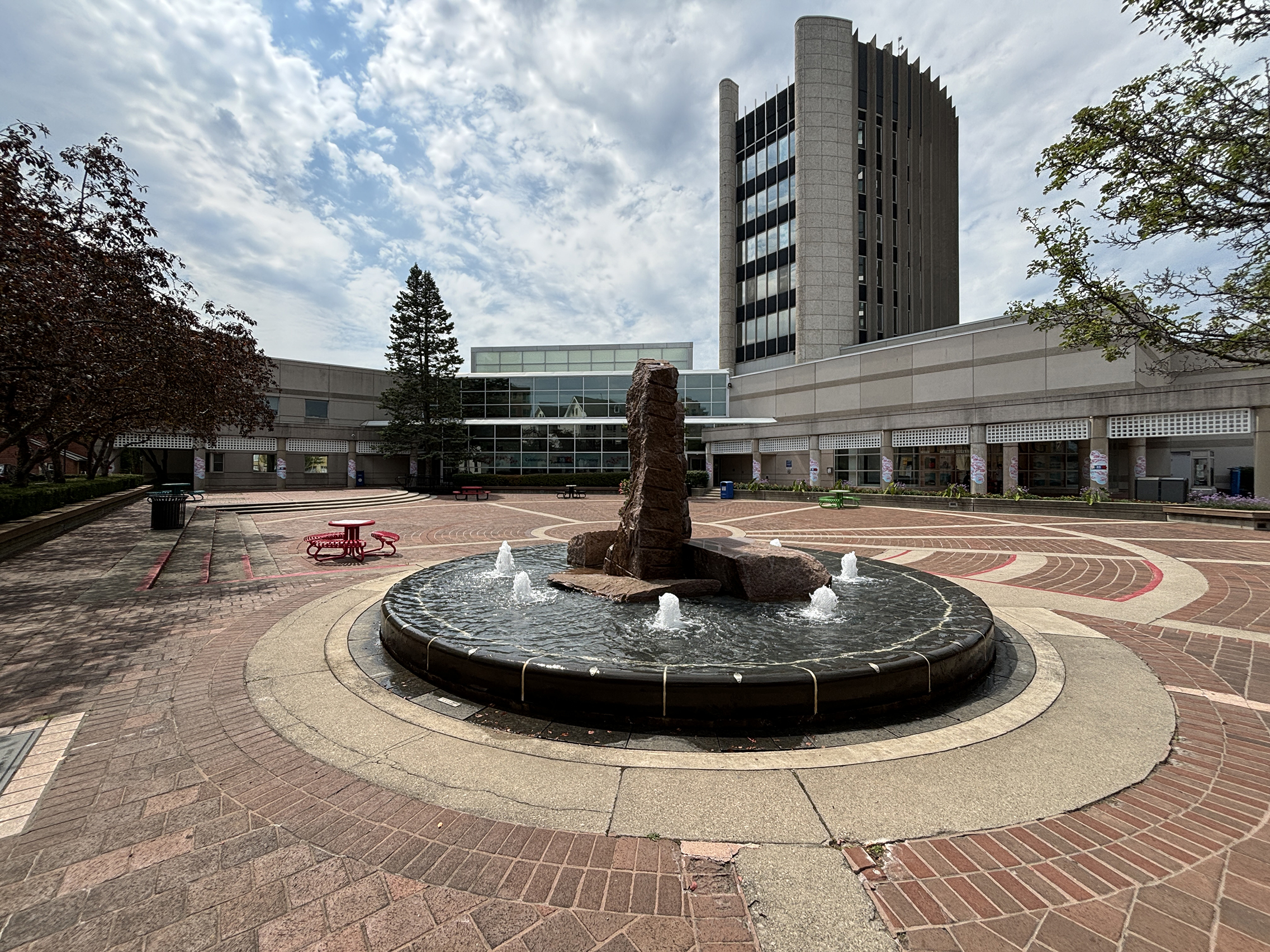
City Hall, on Brant Street

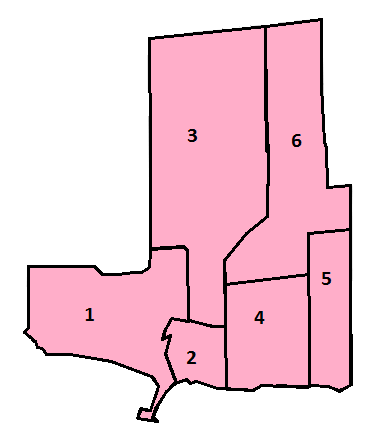
Burlington's six municipal wards

=== Local government ===
The city is divided into six wards, each represented by a city councillor. The mayor, who chairs the city council, is Marianne Meed Ward.

==== City council ====
- Mayor: Marianne Meed Ward
- Ward 1: Kelvin Galbraith
- Ward 2: Lisa Kearns
- Ward 3: Rory Nisan
- Ward 4: Shawna Stolte
- Ward 5: Paul Sharman
- Ward 6: Angelo Bentivegna

=== Federal ===
Burlington federal election results
Year	Liberal		Conservative		New Democratic		Green	
2021	45%	45,058	38%	37,877	11%	10,721	2%	1,820
2019	48%	50,253	35%	36,621	10%	10,324	6%	6,350

Burlington provincial election results
Year	PC		New Democratic		Liberal		Green	
2022	44%	33,239	16%	11,700	31%	23,227	6%	4,566
2018	42%	38,124	28%	24,839	24%	21,517	4%	3,952

Federally, the city is represented by three MPs whose ridings cover parts of the city:

- Burlington (covers most of the city): Karina Gould, Member of Parliament (Liberal)
- Milton (the mainly rural countryside north of Highway 407): Adam van Koeverden (Liberal)
- Oakville North-Burlington (the area bounded by Highway 407 to the north, Upper Middle Road to the south, Guelph Line to the west and 9th Line, Oakville to the east): Pam Damoff (Liberal)

=== Provincial ===
Provincially, the city is represented by three MPPs:

- Burlington: Natalie Pierre (Progressive Conservative)
- Milton: Zee Hamid (Progressive Conservative)
- Oakville North-Burlington: Effie Triantafilopoulos (Progressive Conservative)

== Infrastructure ==
=== Transportation ===
==== Highways ====
Major transportation corridors through the city include:

- Queen Elizabeth Way
- Highway 403
- 407 ETR
- Highway 6
  - Boundary with City of Hamilton

The Queen Elizabeth Way and Ontario Highway 403 run concurrently throughout most of Burlington.

==== North-South Arterial Roads ====
- Burloak Drive
  - Signed as a standard road south/east of Wyecroft Road & Harvester Road.
  - Northern/Western end continues as Upper Middle Road.
  - Boundary with Town of Oakville
- Tremaine Road
  - Boundary with Town of Oakville south of Burnhamthorpe Road West & Number 1 Side Road
- Appleby Line
  - Signed as a standard road south/east of Fairview Street
- Walkers Line
- Guelph Line
  - Signed as a standard road south/east of Fairview Street
- Brant Street
  - Signed as a standard road south/east of Fairview Street
- Waterdown Road

==== East-West Arterial Roads ====
- Lakeshore Road
  - Splits from North Shore Boulevard East at Maple Avenue intersection.
- New Street
- Fairview Street
  - Continues west of QEW Niagara off-ramp as Plains Road East
    - Continues west of Waterdown Road & Lasalle Park Road as Plains Road West
- Harvester Road
- Mainway
- Upper Middle Road
  - Northern/Eastern end continues as Burloak Drive.
  - Signed as a standard road west of Guelph Line
- Dundas Street (former Highway 5)
- Britannia Road
- Derry Road
  - Boundary with Town of Milton

==== Public Transit ====
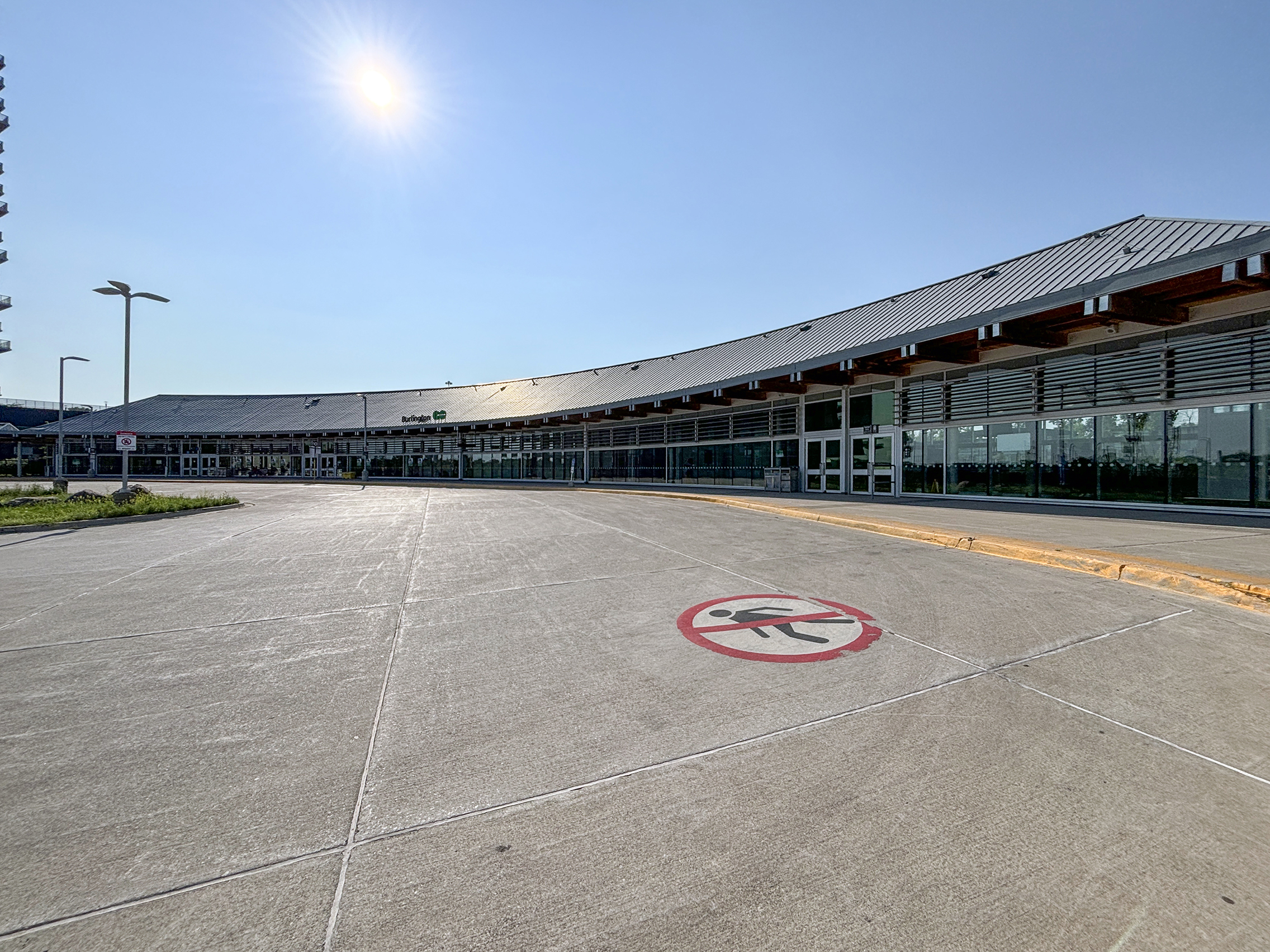
Burlington GO Station

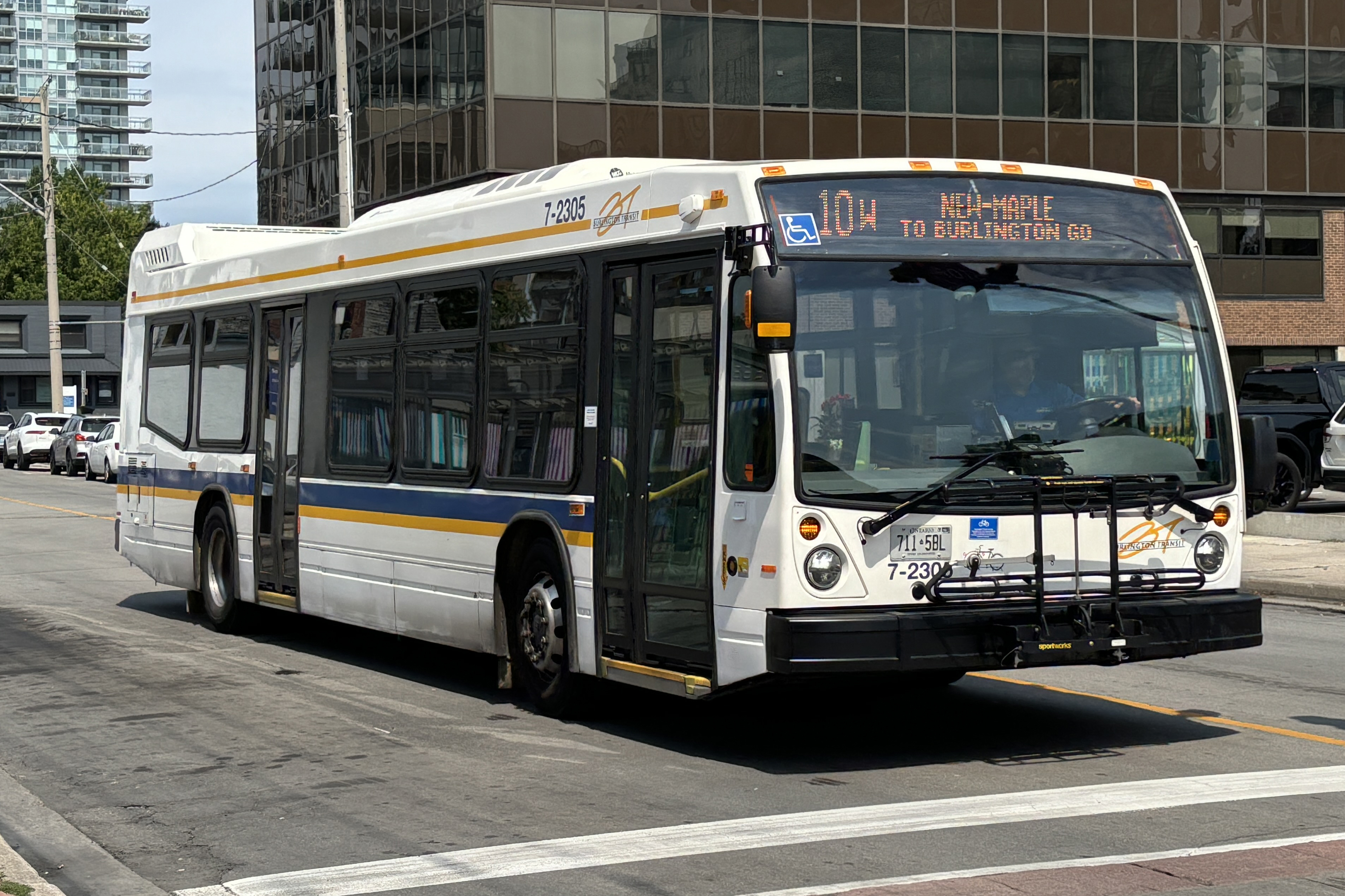
Burlington Transit bus

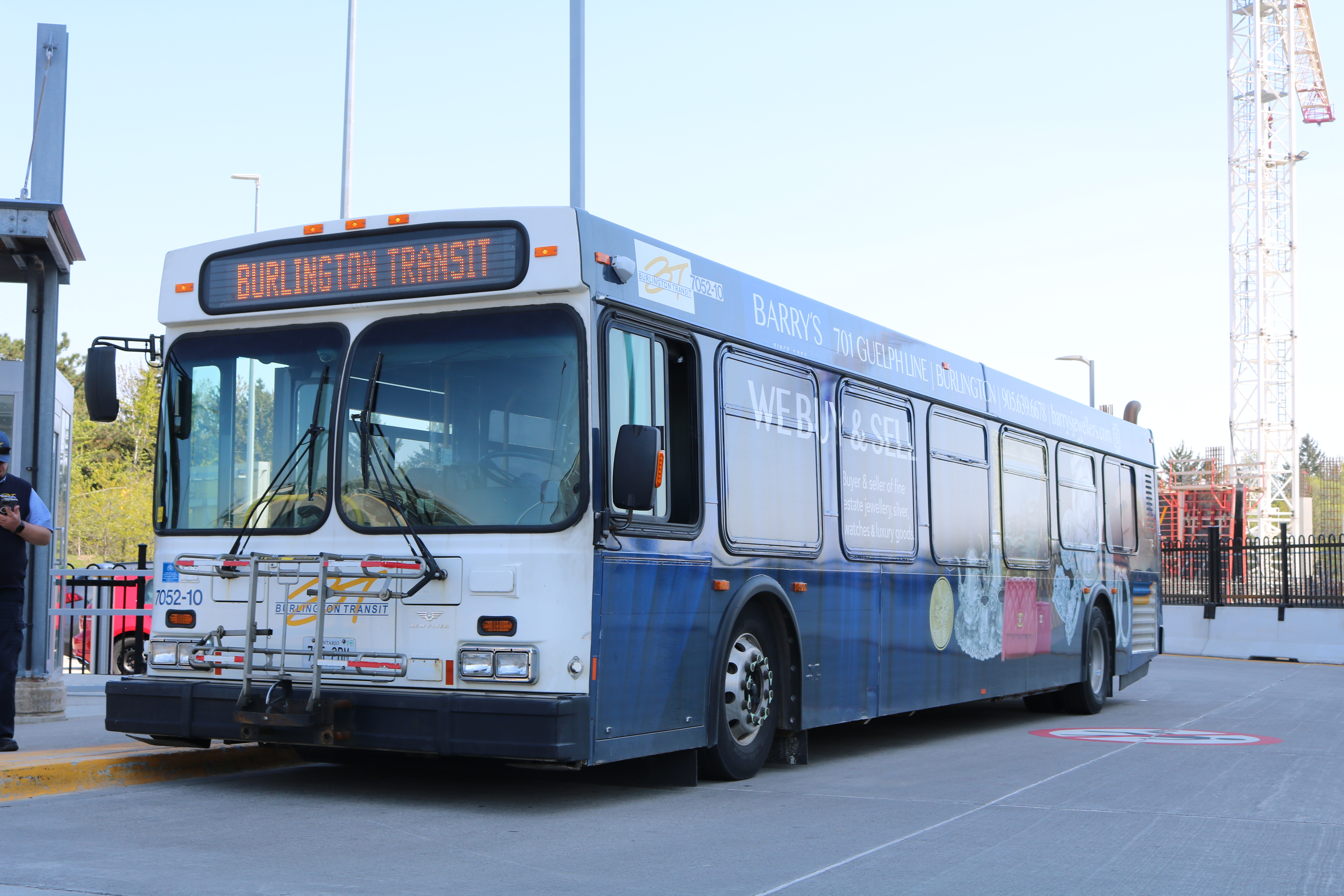
Burlington Transit 2010 New Flyer Industries D40LF #7052-10 sits at the Burlington GO on route 12 while displaying P/R Code 87, "Burlington Transit".

Burlington Transit, the public transport provider in the city, provides bus service on a transportation grid centred on three commuter GO Train stations: Appleby, Burlington and Aldershot.

Commuter rail service is provided by GO Transit at the Appleby GO Station, Burlington GO Station and the Aldershot GO station. Intercity rail service is provided by Via Rail at Aldershot, which also serves Hamilton. Rail cargo transportation is provided by both Canadian National Railway and Canadian Pacific.

Burlington Airpark in the city's north end is a thriving general-aviation without regular commercial passenger flight service. Some charter operations are provided.

On 26 February 2012, a Via Rail train traveling from Niagara Falls to Toronto Union Station derailed in Burlington, with three fatalities.

=== Emergency services ===
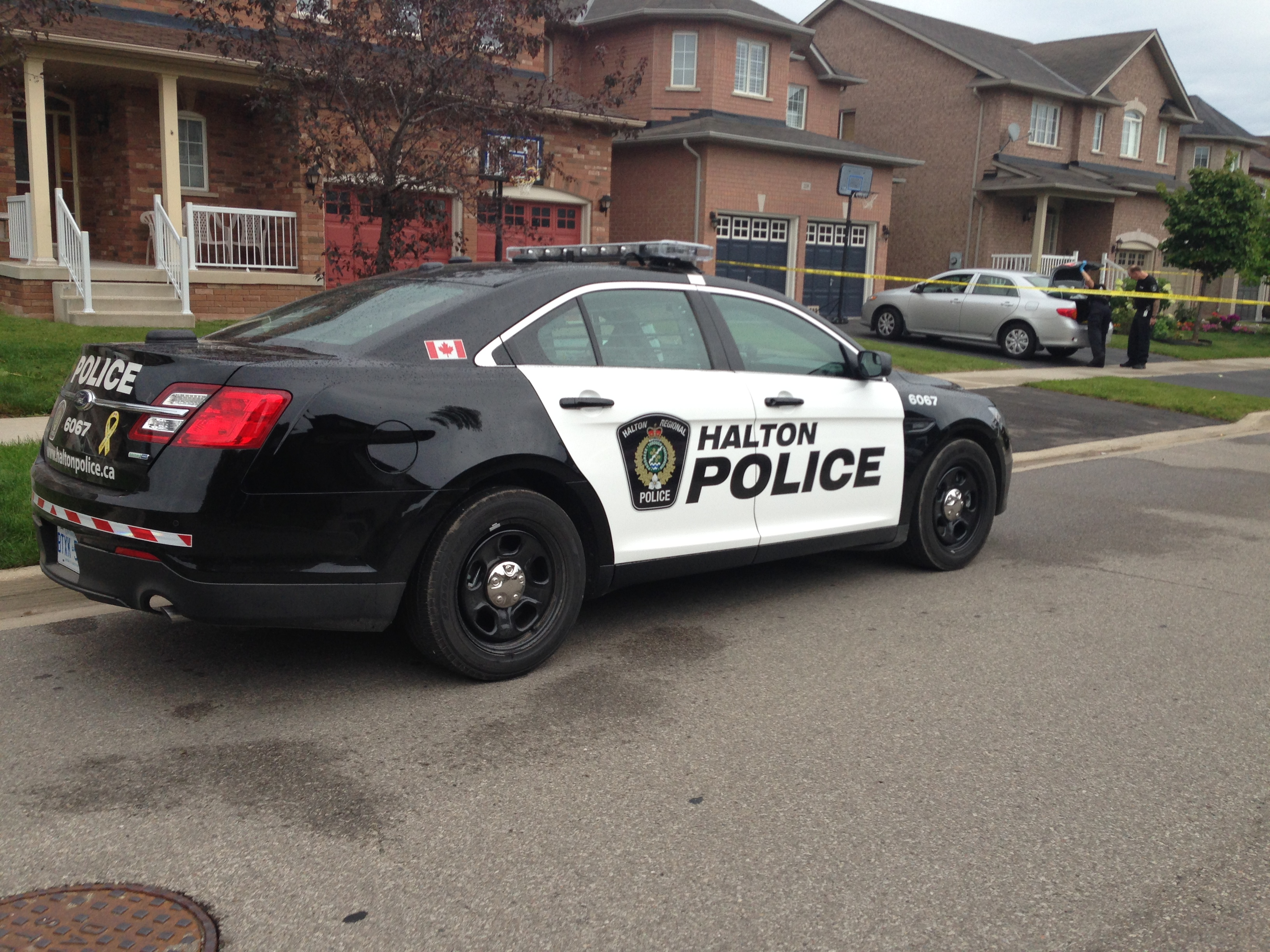
Halton Regional Police Services car

Halton Regional Police Service provides law enforcement.

The Burlington Fire Department offers emergency services from eight fire stations. The services is made up of both career and volunteer fire fighters.

Paramedic services are provided by Halton Region Paramedic Services.

Joseph Brant Memorial Hospital is located in downtown Burlington.

== Education ==
Burlington's public elementary and secondary schools are part of the Halton District School Board. Burlington's Catholic elementary and secondary schools are part of the Halton Catholic District School Board. French public elementary and secondary schools are part of the Conseil scolaire Viamonde and French catholic elementary and secondary schools are part of the Conseil scolaire catholique MonAvenir. Several private schools are also available in the city.

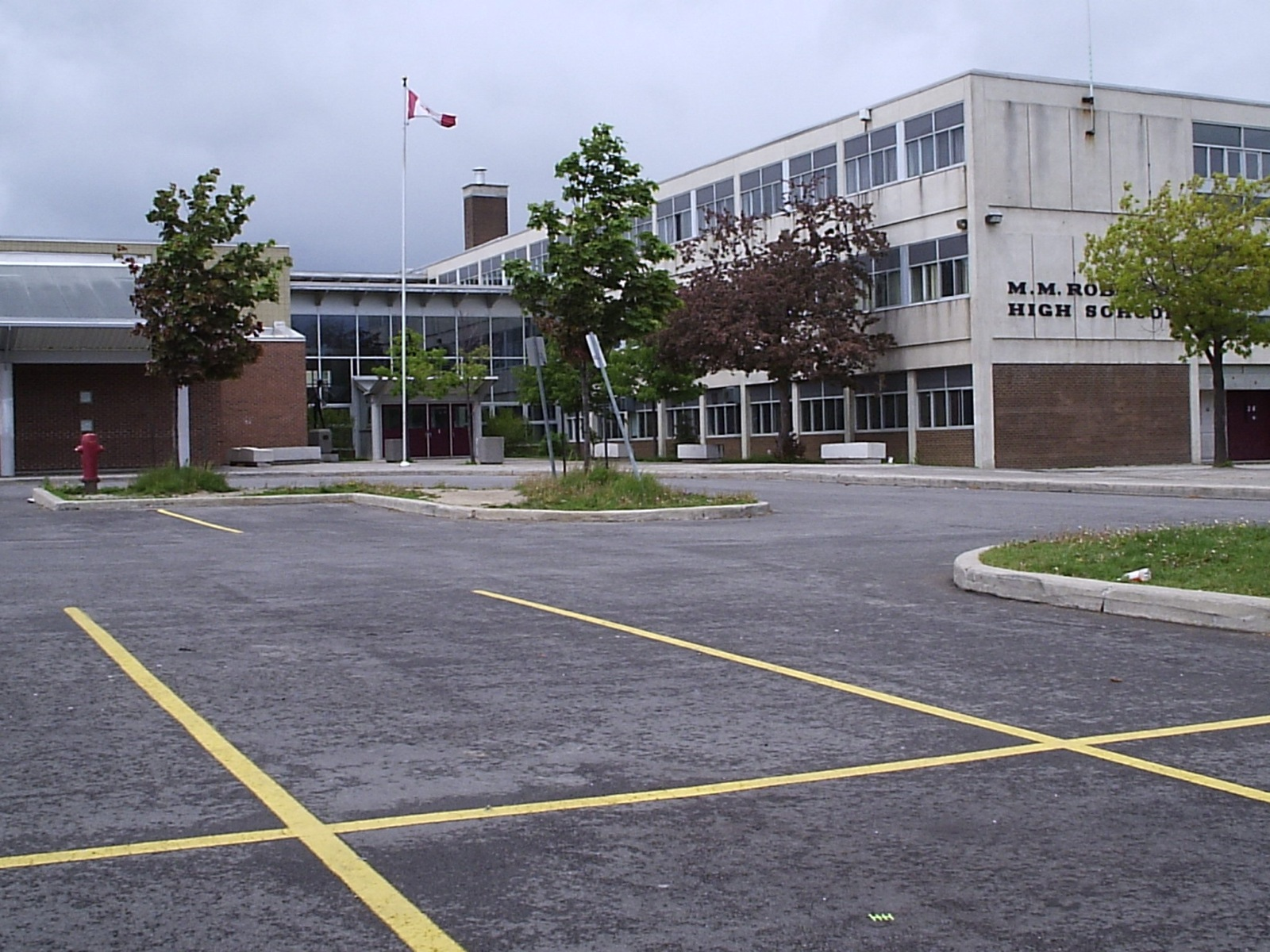
M. M. Robinson High School

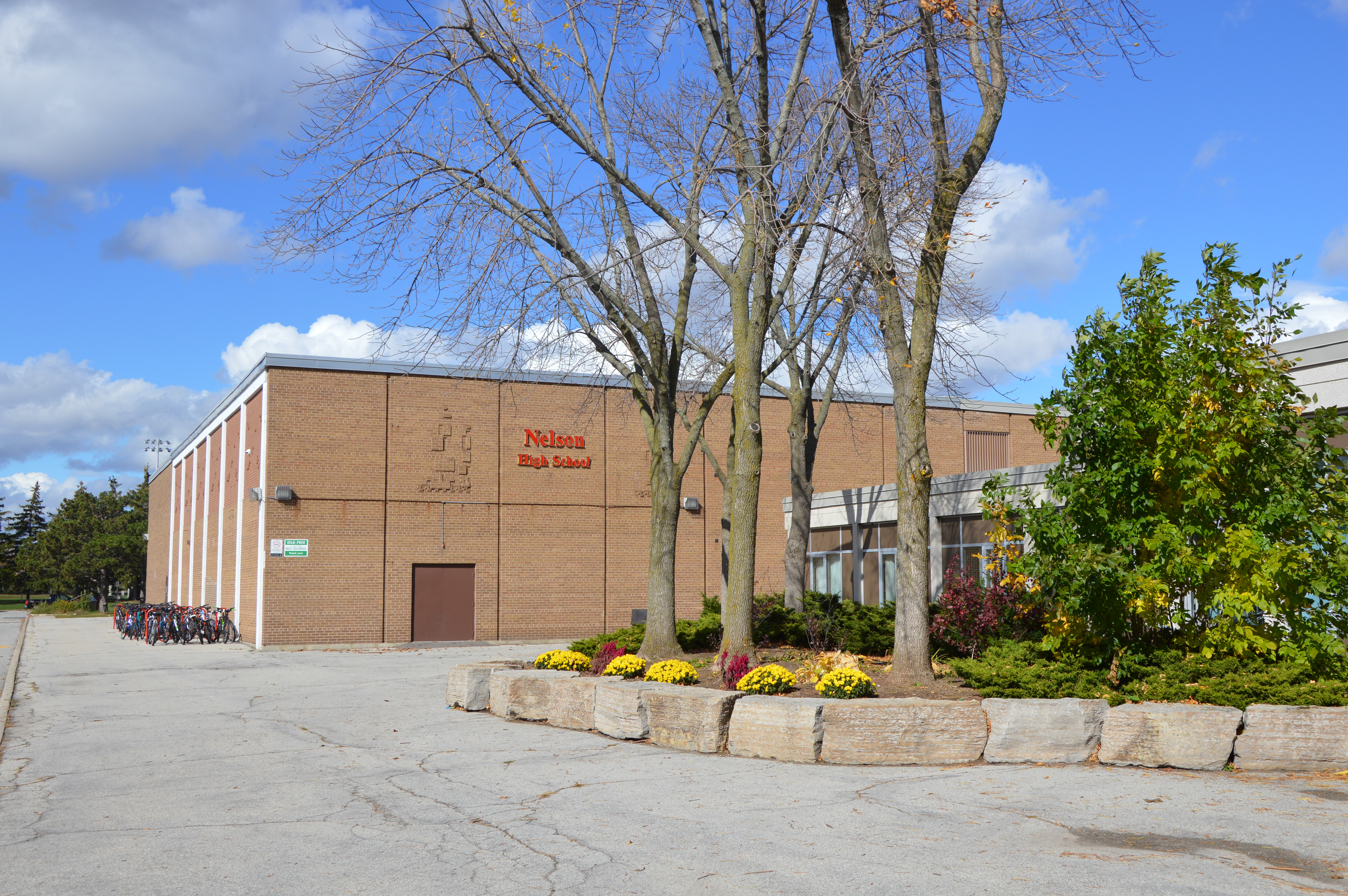
Nelson High School

=== Elementary schools ===
There are 29 public elementary schools and 14 Roman Catholic elementary schools in Burlington.

=== High schools ===
There are six public high schools and three Catholic high schools in the area.

==== Public ====
- Aldershot School (1964) Sports Team: Lions
- Burlington Central High School (1922) Sports Team: Trojans
- Frank J. Hayden Secondary School (2013) Sports Team: Huskies
- Gary Allan High School Burlington Campus – Adult Learners School
- M. M. Robinson High School (1963) Sports Team: Rams
- Nelson High School (1957) Sports Team: Lords

==== Catholic ====
- Assumption Secondary School (1977) Sports Team: Crusaders
- Corpus Christi Catholic Secondary School (2008) Sports Team: Longhorns
- Notre Dame Secondary School (1989) Sports Team: Fighting Irish

=== Colleges and Universities ===
- Australian university Charles Sturt University had a study centre in Burlington that offered programs in Master of International Education, Bachelor of Early Childhood Studies and Master of Business Administration. Operation of the campus ceased in July 2015.
- Mohawk College announced in 2024 its intention to expand into Burlington, growing from its current satellite campus that offers training to become a personal support worker, practical nurse, occupational therapy assistant, and physiotherapy assistant. The expansion will be implemented over several years.
- In 2026 Brock University opened a Burlington campus in the new Robert Bateman Community Centre.

== Media ==
Burlington Post was an online publication from Metroland Media Group. Print publication ceased, but Burlington news is still posted on its website, insidehalton.com. Village Media's BurlingtonToday.com is an online local news source in Burlington, offering the latest breaking news, weather updates, entertainment, sports and business features, obituaries and more.

The Burlington Gazette, the first online newspaper to be accepted as a member of the Ontario Press Council, has published regularly since 2010

Hamilton-based View Magazine is distributed in print, in Burlington.

=== Radio ===
Burlington is part of the Hamilton radio market. One radio station, FM 107.9 CJXY, is licensed to Burlington and another, FM 94.7 CHKX, to "Hamilton/Burlington." Both presently broadcast from studios in Hamilton. Burlington listeners are also served by stations licensed to Toronto, St. Catharines, Niagara Falls and Buffalo, New York.

=== Television stations ===
Burlington is primarily served by media based in Toronto (other than those noted below), as it is geographically in the Greater Toronto and Hamilton Area (GTHA).

- YourTV from the studio in the Cogeco Cable Headquarters at Harvester Road & Burloak Drive.
- Yes TV is based in Burlington with studios on the North Service Road near the junction of the QEW, 403 and 407.

== Notable people ==
=== Visual art and writing ===
- Robert Bateman (born 1930), painter.
- Nicole Dorsey, film director and screenwriter
- Margaret Lindsay Holton (born 1955), artist, author, and designer.
- Donato Mancini, poet
- Sylvia McNicoll (born 1954), author of over twenty novels for children and young adults
- Mostafa Minawi (born 1974), author and historian
- John Lawrence Reynolds (born 1939), author, winner of two Arthur Ellis Awards
- Kelly Richardson (born 1972), artist, born in Burlington.

=== Music ===
- James Anthony (born 1955), USA Hall of Fame Blues Guitarist
- Boys Night Out, rock band
- The Creepshow, psychobilly band
- Jeff Danna (born 1964), film music composer
- Dead and Divine, metal/hardcore band
- Finger Eleven, alternative rock band; all attended Lester B. Pearson High School
- Grade, rock band
- Sarah Harmer (born 1970), singer and songwriter; attended Lester B. Pearson High School
- Jordan Hastings (born 1982), drummer of Alexisonfire
- Idle Sons, rock band; attended Lester B. Pearson, Aldershot and M.M. Robinson High Schools
- Jersey (1995–2005), ska punk band
- Andrew Lockington (born 1974), film music composer
- Melissa McClelland (born 1979), singer and songwriter
- Chris McKhool (born 1968), singer and songwriter
- Devraj Patnaik (born 1975), composer, odissi dancer and choreographer
- Adrianne Pieczonka (born 1963), operatic soprano singer
- Saint Alvia, punk rock band
- Silverstein, post-hardcore band
- Spoons, 1980s new wave band
- Tebey (born 1983), country music artist, attended Assumption Secondary School
- Walk Off the Earth, alternative rock band

=== Sports ===
- Caleb Agada (born 1994), Nigerian-Canadian basketball player in the Israeli Premier League and for the Nigerian national basketball team
- Josh Anderson (born 1994), NHL player, Montreal Canadiens, born in Burlington
- Steve Bauer (born 1959), road bicycle racer; Olympic Silver Medalist (1984 Los Angeles Games); competed in 11 Tours de France, one of only two Canadians to wear the Yellow jersey; born in St. Catharines but resides in Burlington.
- Ryan Bomben (born 1987), played for the Toronto Argonauts of the Canadian Football League, currently is a free agent.
- Melanie Booth (born 1984), soccer player (Canadian Soccer Association, Florida Gators NCAA)
- Cory Conacher (born 1989), NHL player, Buffalo Sabres, New York Islanders, Syracuse Crunch.
- Angela Coughlan (1953–2009), swimmer, winner of a bronze medal at the 1968 Olympic Games; a gold, two silvers and a bronze at the 1970 British Commonwealth Games; a gold and three silvers at the 1971 Pan American Games.
- Adam Creighton (born 1965), retired professional hockey player who played 708 NHL games
- Renata Fast (born 1994), professional ice hockey player with the Toronto Sceptres and Canadian Olympian
- Tony Gabriel (born 1948), retired CFL tight end with the Ottawa Rough Riders and Hamilton Tiger-Cats. eight-time CFL all-star, league MVP 1978, twice winner of the Grey Cup.
- Emma Greco (born 1995), professional ice hockey player with the Ottawa Charge.
- Frank Hayden, Developed the Special Olympics.
- Graham Hood (born 1972), competitive middle-distance runner, Olympian, Pan Am Games champion; Born in Winnipeg but raised in Burlington. Competed at 1992 Olympics (Barcelona) and 1996 Olympics (Atlanta). Gold medallist, 1500 m, at 1999 Pan Am Games (Winnipeg).
- Russ Jackson, retired CFL quarterback, has lived in Burlington since his retirement from teaching
- Ashley Johnston (born 1992), former professional ice hockey player and captain of the Metropolitan Riveters
- Josh Jooris (born 1990), NHL player, Toronto Marlies, born in Burlington
- Mfiondu Kabengele (born 1997), Canadian professional basketball player for the Los Angeles Clippers
- Becky Kellar-Duke (born 1975), hockey player; four-time Olympic medalist
- Mark Lawrence (born 1972), ice hockey winger and coach
- Jesse Lumsden (born 1982), running back with the Edmonton Eskimos and the Hamilton Tiger Cats of the Canadian Football League and Canadian Olympian in the Men's Two and Four-Man Bobsleigh at the Vancouver 2010 Olympics; attended Nelson High School.
- Jeff Malott (born 1996), NHL player, Los Angeles Kings, born in Burlington, raised in Waterdown.
- Emma Maltais (born 1999), professional ice hockey player with the Toronto Sceptres and Olympian
- David Matsos (born 1973), former AHL hockey player; current assistant coach of the Windsor Spitfires
- Trevor Meier (born 1973), former Swiss Nationalliga 'A' Hockey Player, various clubs 1993–2012; born in Oakville, raised in Burlington, and resides in Switzerland.
- Sarah Nurse (born 1995), born in Burlington, professional ice hockey player with the Vancouver Goldeneyes and Olympian
- Andy O'Brien (born 1979), Irish soccer player, Star Striker of the 2004–2005 UCD Super League Champions, Surprise X Saint Germain.
- Mark Oldershaw (born 1983), Canadian sprint canoeist who competed at the 2008 Olympics (Beijing) and won a bronze medal in C-1 1000 m at the 2012 Olympics (London)
- Dave Ridgway (born 1959), placekicker, Saskatchewan Roughriders CFL 1982–1996. Attended M.M. Robinson High School. Inducted into Canadian Football Hall of Fame in 2003. Played NCAA football for the University of Toledo Rockets 1977–1980.
- Melville Marks Robinson (1888–1974), founder of the Commonwealth Games.
- Chris Schultz (1960–2021), offensive tackle with the NFL Dallas Cowboys and CFL Toronto Argonauts, and sportscaster for TSN; attended Aldershot High School
- Ron Sedlbauer (born 1954), former NHL player from 1974 to 1981.
- Simisola Shittu (born 1999), British-born Canadian basketball player for Ironi Ness Ziona of the Israeli Basketball Premier League
- Jordan Szwarz (born 1991), ice hockey player for the Belleville Senators of the AHL.
- Chad Wiseman (born 1981), AHL player, Albany Devils, born in Burlington
- Shane Wright (born 2004), NHL and AHL player, captain of Team Canada at the 2023 World Juniors, born and raised in Burlington.
- Melanie Mackay (born 1954), Olympian swimmer (1976, Montreal).

=== TV, film, and stage ===
- Jillian Barberie (born 1966), actress and television hostess, attended Assumption Secondary School
- Lally Cadeau (born 1948), actor, played Janet King on Road to Avonlea
- Carlos Bustamante – YTV The Zone host and Entertainment Tonight Canada reporter, attended Notre Dame Catholic Secondary School
- Jim Carrey (born 1962), comedian and actor
- Nicole Dorsey, screenwriter and director
- Ryan Gosling (born 1980), actor
- Torri Higginson (born 1969), actress
- Myles Erlick (born 1998), actor and dancer
- Ellora Patnaik (born 1968), actor and odissi dancer
- Gordie Tapp (1922–2016) comedian and country & western musician, (Grand Ole Opry and Hee Haw), resided in Burlington
- Michael Bradshaw (1933–2001) actor, resided in Burlington
- Katherine Barrell, (born 1990), actress, writer, producer and director currently best known for portraying Officer Nicole Haught in Wynonna Earp

=== Crime ===
- Leslie Mahaffy (July 5, 1976 – June 16, 1991) was a resident of Burlington and a victim of serial killers and rapists Paul Bernardo and Karla Homolka.

== Twin cities ==
Burlington has twin-city relationships with the following cities:

- Apeldoorn, Gelderland, Netherlands (May 6, 2005)
  - Both cities have a park or garden named after each other. Burlington is home to Apeldoorn Park while Apeldoorn is home to Burlington Garden.
- Itabashi, Japan (May, 1989)
  - Itabashi Way, Itabashi Garden (opened July 1, 2019) and Itabashi Bridge (gifted June 1997) are all named after the city. Itabashi Bridge was donated to the City of Burlington by Itabashi as gratitude for the city's naming of Itabashi Way. In 2020, Itabashi Garden won the Parks and Recreation Ontario's Award of Excellence for Recreational Facility (non-aquatic) or Park Design.

Past twin-city relationships:

- Burlington, Iowa, United States
- Burlington, Vermont, United States (through the Burlington International Games (BIG)
- Myrtle Beach, South Carolina, United States

== See also ==
- Burlington City Council
- Burlington Executive Aerodrome
