= Burlington Performing Arts Centre =

Multi-purpose venue in Burlington, Ontario

The Burlington Performing Arts Centre
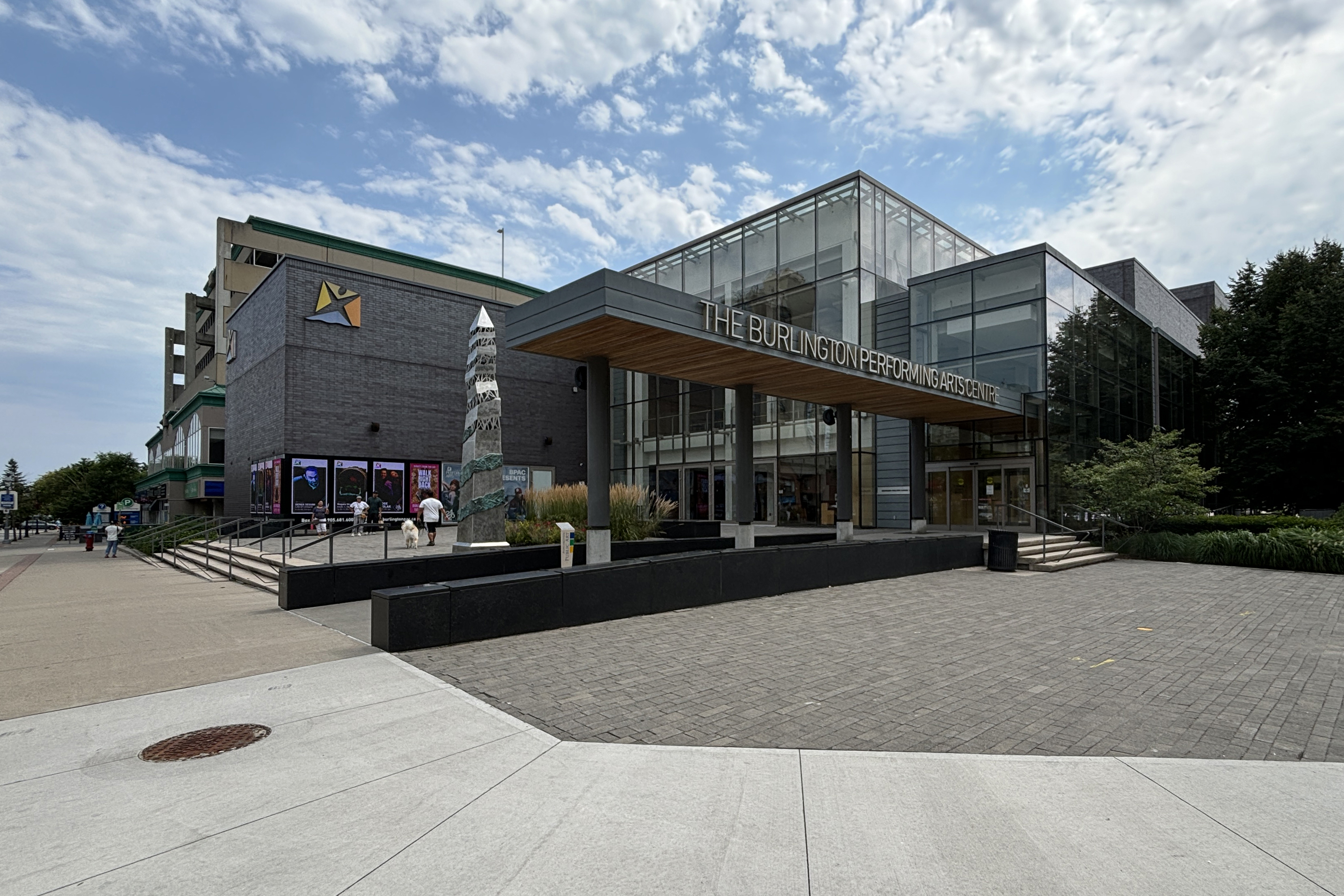
- Burlington Performing Arts Centre
- Interactive map of The Burlington Performing Arts Centre
- Location: Burlington, Ontario, Canada
- Coordinates: 43.32439°N 79.79857°W
- Operator: City of Burlington
- Capacity: 1,000

Construction
- Opened: October 1, 2011
- Cost: C$ 29,000,000
- Architects: Diamond and Schmitt Architects Inc.

Website
- www.burlingtonpac.ca

The Burlington Performing Arts Centre (BPAC) is a multi-purpose venue located in the downtown core of Burlington, Ontario. The venue is the only performing arts centre in Ontario and second in Canada to receive Leadership in Energy and Environmental Design (LEED) Gold certification. The venue features three stages; the Main Theatre, a world-class performance stage featuring a six-story fly tower; Community Studio Theatre, a smaller scale of the Main Theatre with 2,500 square feet of floor space; the Family Lobby, features an open concept with a glass roof encircled by a balcony overlooking the floor.

In 2015, the Centre commissioned an Economic Impact Study that found that the estimated economic impact of the Centre was $7.8 million in 2014.

== Construction ==
In March 2007, the City of Burlington purchased land from the Halton Regional Police Service, where a police station once was at the corner of Locust Street and Elgin Street. In September 2007, the City of Burlington retained Diamond and Schmitt Architects Inc. to design The Centre. The official groundbreaking occurred in March 2009. The Burlington Performing Arts Centre opened its doors on October 1, 2011.
