= Mostafa Minawi =

American historian of the Ottoman Empire

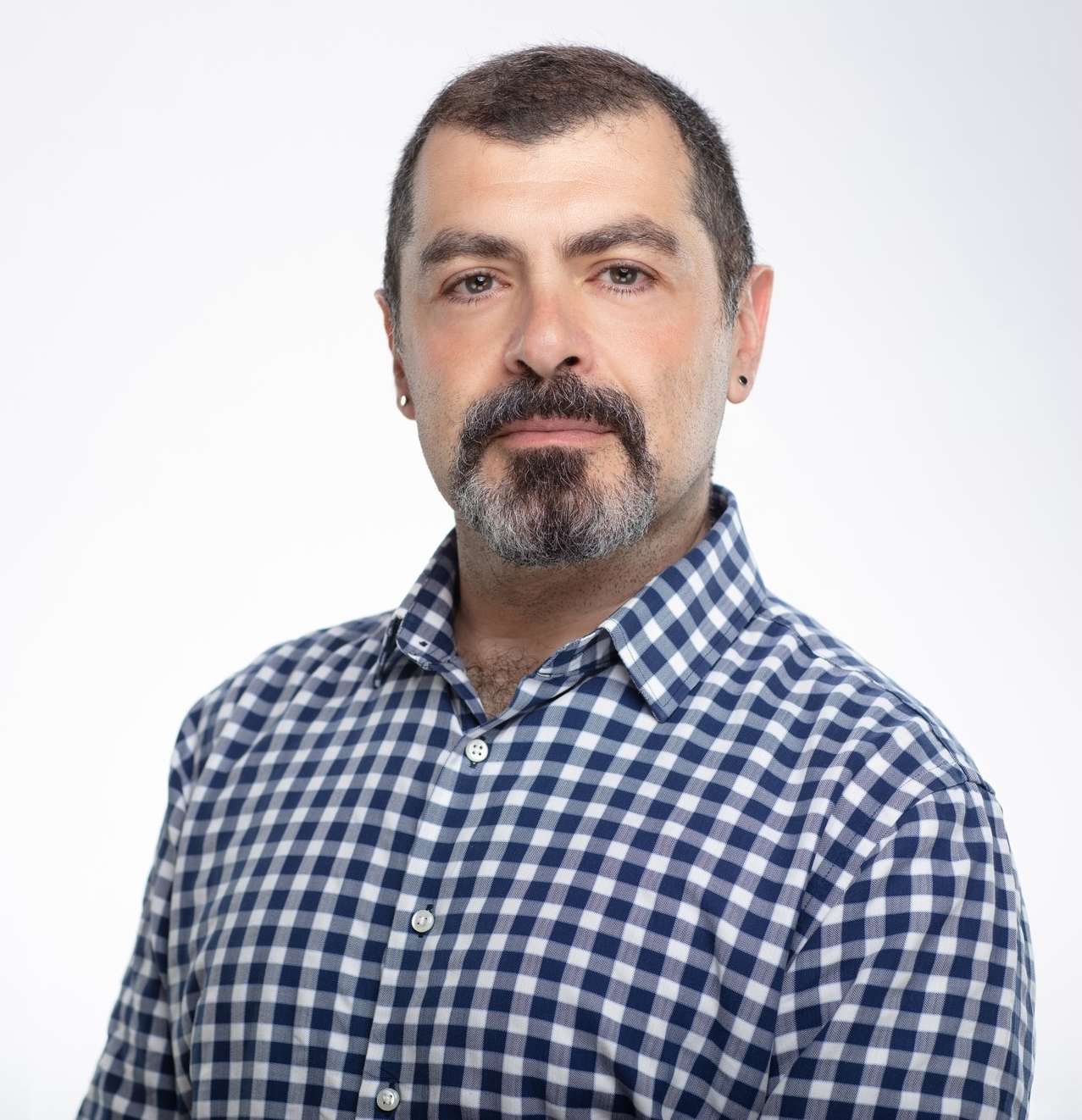
- Born: January 24, 1974 (age 52); Beirut, Lebanon
- Occupation: Historian

Academic background
- Education: New York University (PhD); University of Toronto (M.A.); McMaster University (B.ENG)

Academic work
- Discipline: History
- Sub-discipline: Ottoman history, Middle Eastern history, Global history, Microhistory, International Law
- Institutions: Cornell University
- Notable works: The Ottoman Scramble for Africa: Empire and Diplomacy from the Sahara to the Hijaz (2016); Losing Istanbul: Arab-Ottoman Imperialists and the End of Empire (2022)

Mostafa Minawi (born January 24, 1974) is a Palestinian-American historian and professor of history at Cornell University. His scholarship focuses on the late Ottoman Empire, imperialism, international law, and transimperial history, particularly in the Middle East, North Africa, and the Horn of Africa. He is the founding director of Cornell’s Critical Ottoman and Post-Ottoman Studies Initiative at the Mario Einaudi Center for International Studies. and serves on the faculty of History, Africana Studies, Jewish Studies, and Near Eastern Studies.

== Early life and education ==
Minawi was born in Beirut to Palestinian refugees from Yaffa. He moved to Burlington, Ontario, Canada, at the age of 15. He received his Bachelor of Engineering and Management from McMaster University in Hamilton, Ontario. After working as a consultant at CIBC in Toronto, he returned to university, where he received his Master of Arts in history from the University of Toronto. He moved to New York City to pursue his a PhD in history and Middle Eastern and Islamic studies from New York University.

== Academic career ==
Minawi joined the Department of History at Cornell University in 2012. At Cornell, he teaches courses on Ottoman history, Modern Middle Eastern history, and global imperialism. He has held several prestigious fellowships and visiting appointments at institutions including the National Humanities Center, Institute for Advanced Studies at the Central European University, the Institute for Advanced Study in the Global South at Northwestern University in Qatar, ANAMED at Koç University, and the Remarque Institute at New York University.

== Research and scholarship ==
Minawi's research focuses on imperialism in the Middle East and Northeast Africa in the nineteenth and twentieth centuries. His work emphasizes microhistory, imperial competition, and the legal and diplomatic dimensions of empire. His research challenges Eurocentric narratives of imperialism by amplifying Ottoman perspectives on sovereignty, territoriality, and colonial rule. His research relies on sources in Arabic, Ottoman Turkish, modern Turkish, and French.

== Publications ==
=== Books ===
- The Ottoman Scramble for Africa: Empire and Diplomacy in the Sahara and the Hijaz (Stanford University Press, 2016)
- Losing Istanbul: Arab-Ottoman Imperialists and the End of Empire (Stanford University Press, 2022)

=== Articles ===
- Minawi, Mostafa (November 1, 2016). "Telegraphs and Territoriality in Ottoman Africa and Arabia during the Age of High Imperialism". Journal of Balkan and Near Eastern Studies. 18 (6): 567–587. doi:10.1080/19448953.2016.1196048. ISSN 1944-8953.

== Awards and honors ==
- Albert Hourani Book Award, Middle East Studies Association, for Losing Istanbul (2023)
- Fellowship, National Humanities Center (2024–2025)

== Public engagement ==
Minawi has contributed to public scholarship through lectures, podcasts, documentary consultation, and educational media projects, including two collaborations with TED-Ed about the Rise and the Fall of the Ottoman Empire. His work frequently appears in academic and public discussions of empire, colonialism, and global history.

== See also ==
- Ottoman Empire
- Middle Eastern history
- Imperialism
- Global History
