= List of public libraries in Ontario =

This is a list of public libraries in Ontario. Ontario public libraries are created by municipal by-laws and governed by public library boards. The Ontario Ministry of Tourism and Culture has responsibility for the administration of the Public Libraries Act. The ministry's Culture Services Unit provides support for the public library system and the Ontario Library Service deliver programs on behalf of the ministry.

== A ==
- Addington Highlands Public Libraries
- Admaston / Bromley Public Library
- Ajax Public Library
- Alderville First Nation Library
- Alfred-Plantagenet Township Public Library
- Algonquins of Pikwakanagan Public Library
- Alnwick / Haldimand Public Library
- Anishinabe of Wauzhushk First Nation
- Armstrong Township Public Library
- Arnprior Public Library
- Asphodel-Norwood Township Public Library
- Assiginack Public Library
- Athens Township Public Library
- Atikokan Public Library
- Augusta Public Library
- Aurora Public Library

== B ==
- Bancroft Public Library
- Barrie Public Library
- Barry's Bay & Area Public Library
- Beausoleil First Nation Public Library
- Belleville Public Library
- Big Grassy First Nation Public Library
- Bkejwanong First Nation Community Library
- Black River / Matheson Public Library
- Blind River Public Library
- Blue Mountains Public Library
- Bonfield Public Library
- Bonnechere Union Public Library
- Bracebridge Public Library
- Brampton Library
- Bradford West Gwillimbury Public Library
- Brant Public Library
- Brighton Public Library
- Brock Township Public Libraries
- Brockville Public Library
- Bruce County Public Library
- Bruce Mines and Plummer Additional Union Public Library brucemines.olsn.ca
- Burk's Falls, Armour & Ryerson Union Public Library
- Burlington Public Library

== C ==
- Caldwell First Nation Public Library
- Caledon Public Library
- Callander Public Library
- Cambridge Public Library (Ontario)
- Carleton Place Public Library
- Carlow-Mayo Public Library
- Casselman Public Library
- Cavan Monaghan Library
- Central Manitoulin Public Library
- Champlain Township Public Library
- Chapleau Public Library
- Chatham-Kent Public Library
- Chippewas of Georgina Island First Nation Library
- Chippewas of Kettle and Stony Point First Nation Public Library
- Chippewas of the Thames First Nation Library & Resource Center 1
- Clarington Public Library
- Clarence-Rockland Public Library
- Clearview Public Library
- Cobalt Public Library
- Cobourg Public Library
- Collingwood Public Library
- Conmee Public Library
- Cornwall Public Library
- Cramahe Township Public Library
- Curve Lake First Nation Public Library

== D ==
- Deep River: W.B. Lewis Public Library
- Delaware Nation Public Library
- Deseronto Public Library
- Dorion Public Library
- Douro-Dummer Public Library
- Dryden Public Library

== E ==
- Ear Falls Public Library
- East Ferris Public Library
- East Gwillimbury Public Library
- Edwardsburgh / Cardinal Public Library
- Elgin County Public Library
- Elizabethtown - Kitley Township Public Library
- Elliot Lake Public Library
- Englehart Public Library
- Essa Public Library
- Essex County Library

== F ==
- Fort Erie Public Library
- Fort Frances Public Library
- Front of Yonge Public Library

== G ==
- Galway-Cavendish & Harvey Township Public Library
- Gananoque Public Library
- Georgian Bay (Township of) Public Library
- Georgina Public Libraries
- Grand Valley Public Library
- Gravenhurst Public Library
- Greater Madawaska Public Library
- Greater Sudbury Public Library
- Grey Highlands Public Library
- Grimsby Public Library
- Guelph Public Library

== H ==
- Haliburton County Public Library
- Haldimand County Public Libraries
- Halton Hills Public Library
- Hamilton Public Library
- Hanover Public Library
- Hastings Highlands Public Library
- Havelock-Belmont-Methuen (Township of) Public Library
- Hawkesbury Public Library
- Head, Clara & Maria Township Public Library
- Huntsville Public Library
- Huron County Library

== I ==
- Innisfil Public Library

== J ==
- John Dixon Public Library

== K ==
- Kanhiote Tyendinaga Territory Public Library
- Kawartha Lakes Public Library
- Kenora Public Library
- Killaloe Public Library
- King Township Public Library
- Kingston Frontenac Public Library
- Kitchener Public Library

== L ==
- La Nation Public Library
- Lake of Bays Public Library
- Lambton County Library
- Lanark Highlands Public Library
- Laurentian Hills Public Library
- Leeds & The Thousand Islands Public Library
- Lennox & Addington County Information Services
- Lincoln Public Library
- London Public Library

== M ==
- Madoc Public Library
- Magnetawan Public Library
- Marmora and Lake Public Library
- Manitouwadge Public Library
- Markham Public Library
- McKellar Public Library
- Meaford Public Library
- Merrickville Public Library
- Michipicoten Township Public Library
- Middlesex County Library
- Midland Public Library
- Milton Public Library
- Mississauga Library System
- Mississaugas of the New Credit First Nation Library
- Mississippi Mills Public Library
- Mnjikaning First Nation Public Library
- Muskoka Lakes Township Public Libraries

== N ==
- New Tecumseth Public Library
- Newmarket Public Library
- Niagara Falls Public Library
- Niagara-on-the-Lake Public Library
- Ninda-kiKaendjigae-Wigammik First Nation Public Library
- Nipigon Public Library
- Norfolk County Public Library
- North Bay Public Library
- North Grenville Public Library
- North Hastings Public Library
- North Himsworth Public Library
- North Kawartha Public Library
- North Perth Public Library

== O ==
- Oakville Public Library
- Oliver Paipoonge Public Library
- Oneida Community Library
- Orangeville Public Library
- Orillia Public Library
- Oshawa Public Library
- Oxford County Public Library
- Otonabee-South Monaghan Township Public Library
- Ottawa Public Library
- Owen Sound & North Grey Union Public Library

== P ==
- Parry Sound Public Library
- Pelham Public Library
- Pelee Island Public Library
- Pembroke Public Library
- Penetanguishene Public Library
- Perth East Public Library
- Perth and District Union Public Library
- Petawawa Public Library
- Peterborough Public Library
- Pickering Public Library
- Port Colborne Public Library
- Port Hope Public Library
- Powassan & District Union Public Library
- Prescott Public Library
- Prince Edward County Public Library

== Q ==
- Quinte West Public Library

== R ==
- Ramara Township Public Library
- Red Rock Public Library
- Region of Waterloo Library
- Renfrew Public Library
- Richmond Hill Public Library
- Rideau Lakes Union Public Library
- Russell Township Public Library

== S ==
- Saugeen First Nation Public Library
- Sault Ste. Marie Public Library
- Schreiber Public Library
- Scugog Memorial Public Library
- Selwyn Public Library
- Severn Township Public Library
- Shelburne Public Library
- Sioux Lookout Public Library
- Simcoe Library Cooperative
- Six Nations Public Library
- Smiths Falls Public Library
- Springwater Township Public Library
- St. Catharines Public Library
- St. Marys Public Library
- St. Thomas Public Library
- Stirling-Rawdon Public Library
- Stormont, Dundas & Glengarry County Library
- Stratford Public Library

== T ==
- Tay Public Library
- Teck Centennial Public Library
- Temagami Public Library
- Temiskaming Shores Public Library
- Terrace Bay Public Library
- Thorold Public Library
- Thunder Bay Public Library
- Timmins Public Library
- Toronto Public Library
- Trent Hills Public Library
- Tudor & Cashel Township Public Library
- Tweed Public Library
- Tyendinaga Township Public Library

== U ==
- Uxbridge Public Library

== V ==
- Vaughan Public Libraries

== W ==
- Wahta Mohawks Library
- Wainfleet Township Public Library
- Wasaga Beach Public Library
- Waterloo Public Library
- Welland Public Library
- Wellington County Public Library
- West Grey Public Library
- West Lincoln Public Library
- West Nipissing Public Library
- West Perth Public Library
- Whitby Public Library
- Whitchurch-Stouffville Public Library
- White River Public Library
- Whitewater Region Public Library
- Windsor Public Library
- Woodstock Public Library

== See also ==
- Library and Archives Canada
- List of libraries
- List of national and state libraries
- List of archives
