= Vaughan Public Libraries =

9 libraries in Vaughan, Ontario, Canada

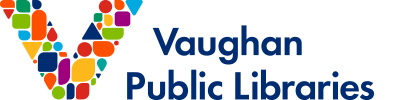

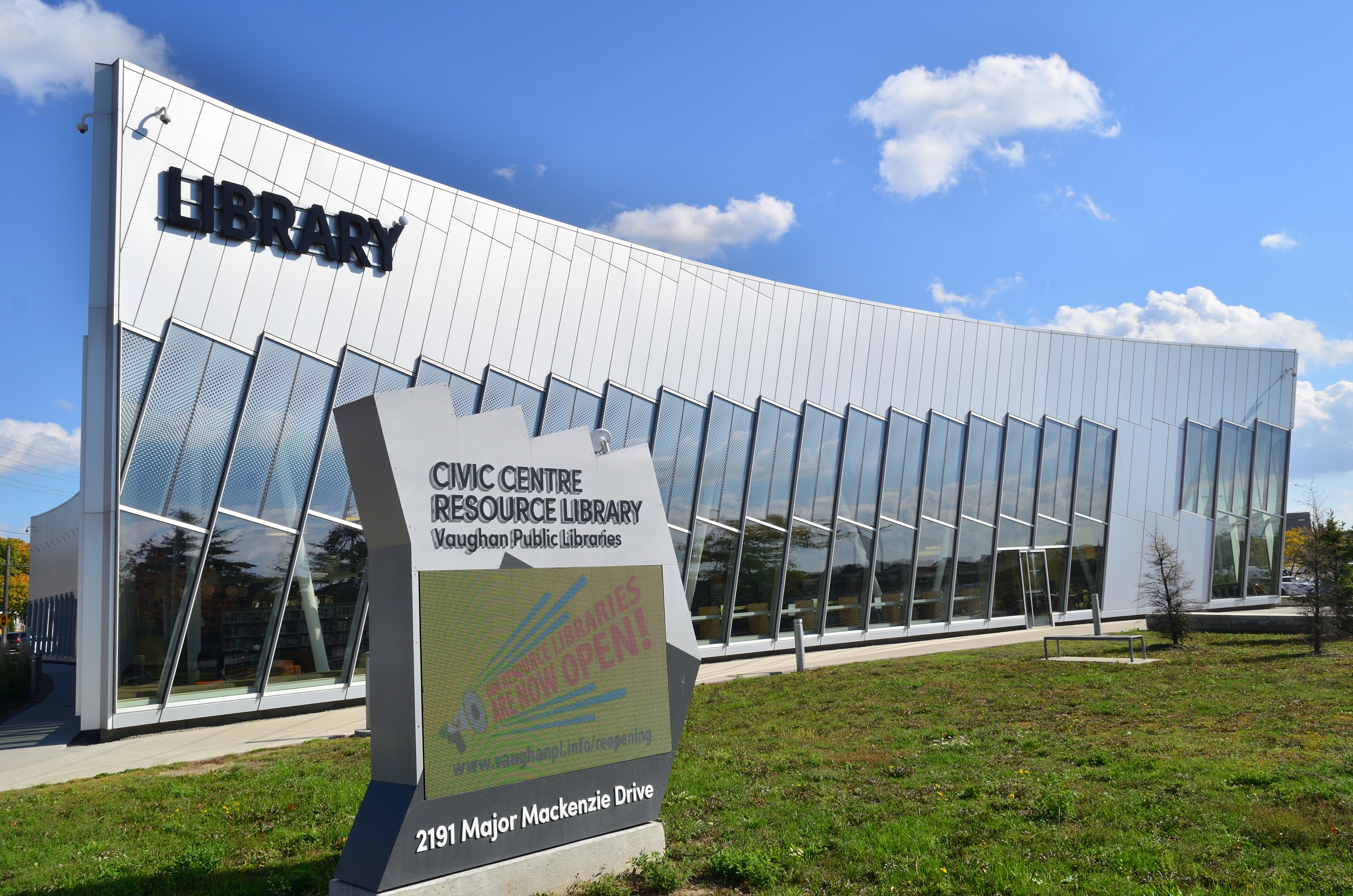
- Civic Centre Resource Library
- Location: Vaughan, Ontario, Canada
- Branches: 12

Collection
- Items collected: business directories, phone books, maps, government publications, books, periodicals, genealogy, local history,

Other information
- Website: http://www.vaughanpl.info/

Vaughan Public Libraries (VPL) is a public library system consisting of 13 libraries and 2 express self-serve locations in the city of Vaughan in Ontario, Canada. It has a collection of more than 551,000 items and serves nearly 1.9 million visitors a year. VPL has thirteen library locations, including three resource libraries. The Bathurst Clark Resource Library opened in 1994. Pierre Berton Resource Library opened in 2004. Civic Centre Resource Library, opened in May 2016, houses VPL’s administration offices. The latest branch, Carrville Library (located in the Carrville Community Centre), opened to the public on July 6, 2025. VPL serves the growing multicultural community of Vaughan by offering collections in Arabic, Chinese, Gujarati, Hebrew, Hindi, Italian, Korean, Malayalam, Persian, Portuguese, Persian, Punjabi, Russian, Spanish, Tamil, Ukrainian, Urdu, and Vietnamese, in addition to French and English.

The current Chief Executive Officer of Vaughan Public Libraries is Lisa McDonough.

== Locations ==
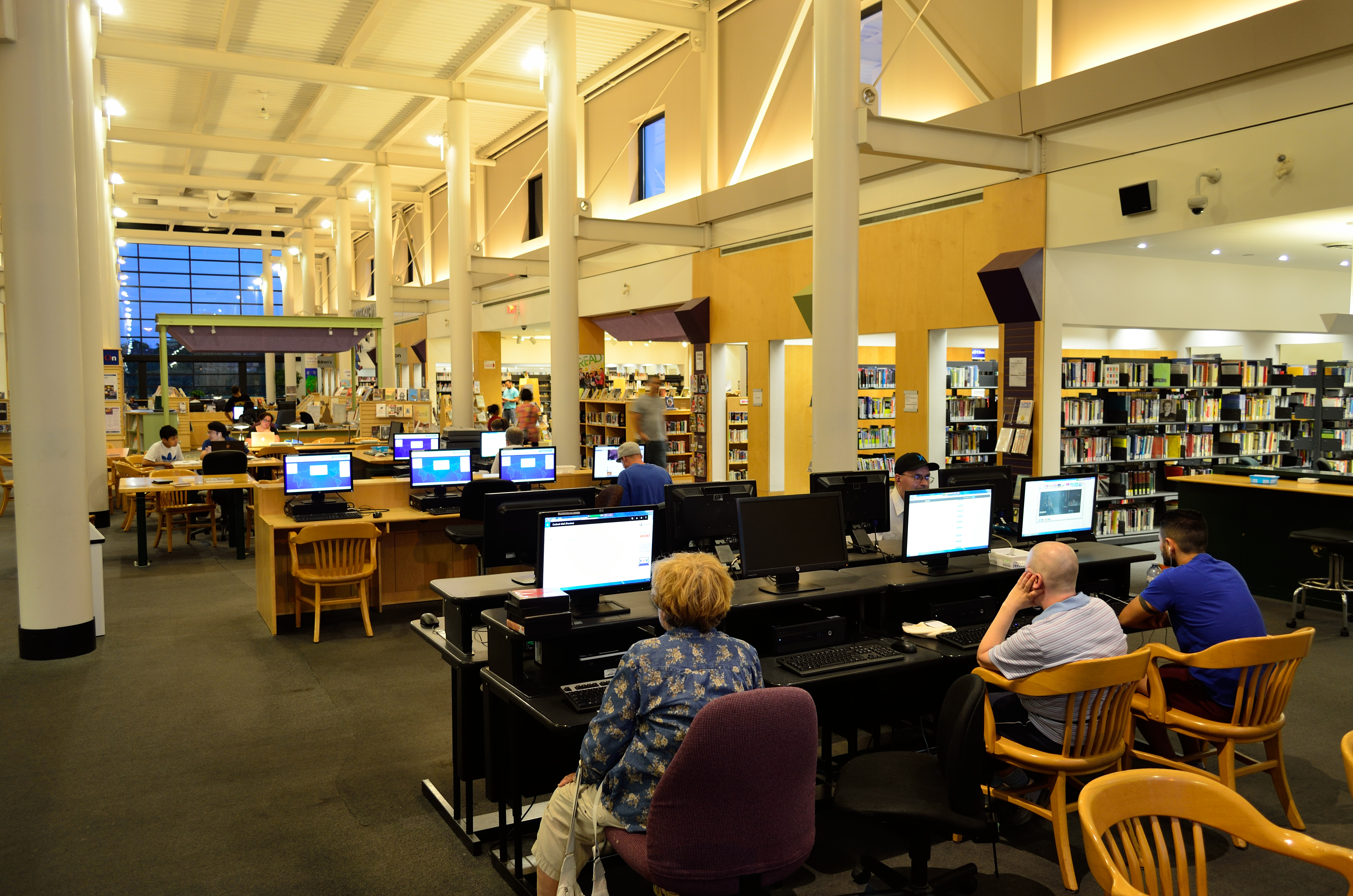
Bathurst Clark Resource Library

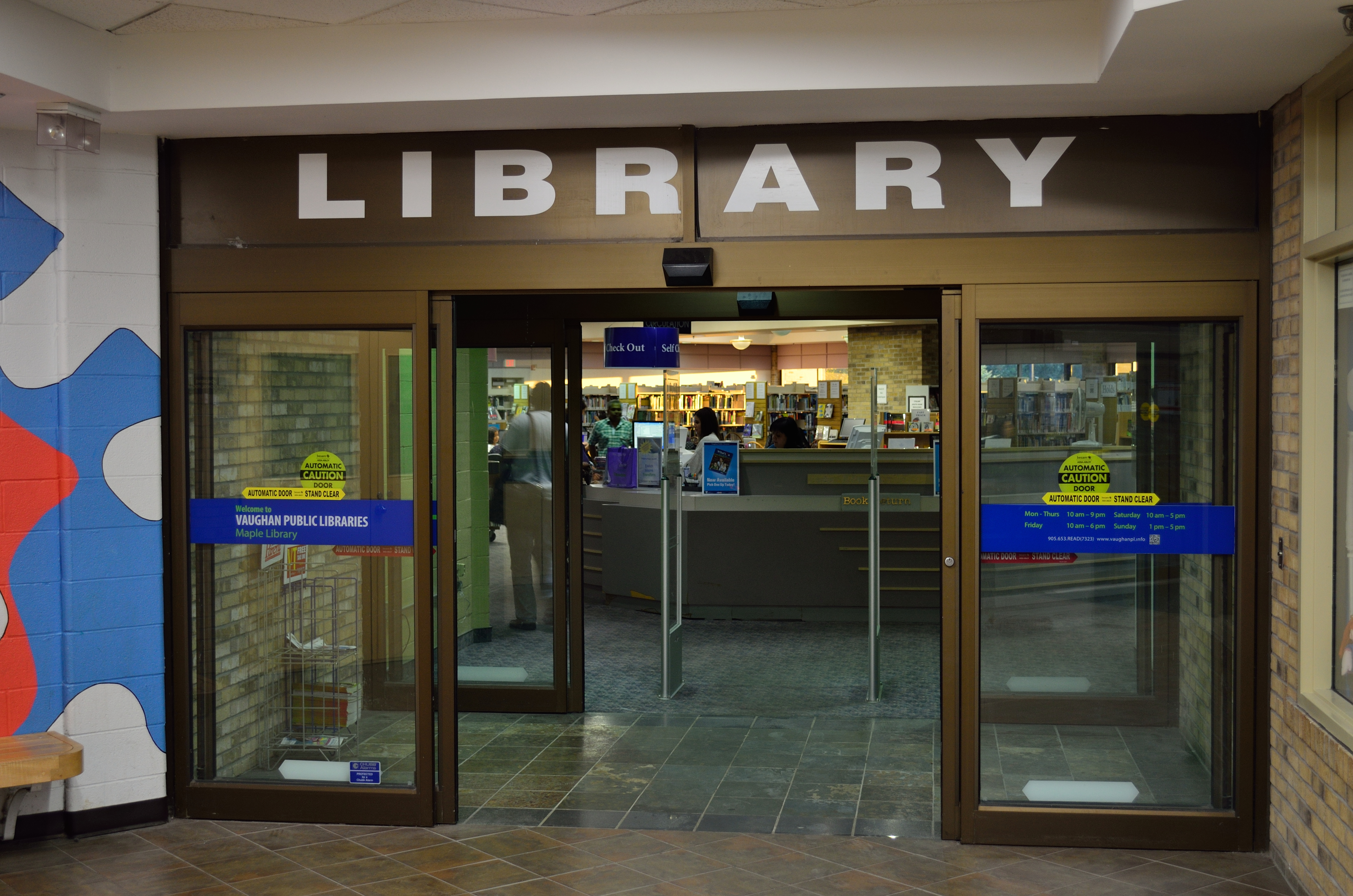
Maple Library

The locations of Vaughan Public Libraries are:

| Location | Address | Collection Size |
|---|---|---|
| Ansley Grove Library | 350 Ansley Grove Road, Woodbridge, ON L4L 3W4 | 40,000 |
| Bathurst Clark Resource Library | 900 Clark Avenue West, Thornhill, ON L4J 8C1 | 110,000 |
| Carrville Library | 655 Thomas Cook Avenue, Maple, ON L6A 4M2 | 18,000 |
| Civic Centre Resource Library | 2191 Major MacKenzie Drive, Maple, ON L6A 4W2 | 110,000 |
| Dufferin Clark Library | 1441 Clark Avenue West, Thornhill, ON L4J 7R4 | 35,000 |
| FEB Express | 8141 Martin Grove Road, Woodbridge, ON L4L 3W9 | 200 |
| Kleinburg Library | 10341 Islington Avenue N., Kleinburg, ON L0J 1C0 | 12,000 |
| Mackenzie Health Vaughan Library | 3200 Major Mackenzie Drive West, Vaughan, ON L6A 4Z3 | 10,000 |
| Maple Library | 10190 Keele Street, Maple, ON L6A 1G3 | 25,000 |
| Pierre Berton Resource Library | 4921 Rutherford Road, Woodbridge, ON L4L 1A6 | 75,000 |
| Pleasant Ridge Library | 300 Pleasant Ridge Avenue, Thornhill, ON L4J 9B3 | 45,000 |
| Vellore Village Library | 1 Villa Royale Avenue, Woodbridge, ON L4H 2Z7 | 35,000 |
| VMC Library | 200 Apple Mill Road, Vaughan, ON L4K 0J8 | 20,000 |
| VMC Express | 200 Apple Mill Road, Vaughan, ON L4K 0J8 | 1500 |
| Woodbridge Library | 150 Woodbridge Avenue, Woodbridge, ON L4L 2S7 | 25,000 |

The Maple Library and the community centre in which it is located underwent renovations in June 2021 and reopened in April 2022. Upgrades and additions include accessibility features, free Wi-Fi, and an outdoor reading garden.

== Membership ==
Free library memberships are available for those who live, work, attend school full-time or own property in the city of Vaughan. VPL also offer free membership to members of Aurora Public Library, Brampton Library, Caledon Public Library, King Township Public Library, Newmarket Public Library, Richmond Hill Public Library, and Markham Public Library. All other people may acquire a membership by paying an annual fee of $80.00.

== Services ==
Members of Vaughan Public Libraries have access to a diverse collection of resources including books, media, electronic databases, and other library services.

- Information and reference services
- Access to full text databases
- Community information
- Internet access
- Reader's advisory services
- Programs for children, youth and adults
- Delivery to homebound individuals
- Interlibrary loan
- Free downloadable audiobooks
- WiFi Access
- Public Microsoft Office workstations
- Email Librarian
- AskON live chat research help services
- Business resources
- Community information
- Job/Career resources
- Access to full-text databases
- Computer training suite and boardroom
- Meeting room rentals
- Exam proctoring
- Study rooms
- Volunteer opportunities
- Photocopiers/Printers available
- Adult Basic Literacy
- English as a Second Language
- Overdrive Digital Collection
- Multilingual Collections

== Borrowing privileges ==
Holdings are loaned to a patron for a period of time dependent on the type of item borrowed:

| Item Types | Loan Period |
|---|---|
| Books, Audiobooks, CDs, eBook Readers, Non-fiction DVDs & Blu-rays | 3 weeks |
| Bestselling Books and Audiobooks | 2 weeks |
| Magazines | 7 days |
| Fiction DVDs & Blu-rays | 7 days |
| iPads and eReaders | 7 days |
| Fast Track Books | 7 days |
| Fast Track Audio-Visual | 3 days |

== Special collections ==
Special collections at VPL include:

Adult Basic Literacy – This is a collection for adult learners. It includes books, kits of books and audio, Internet links, and databases. Adult Basic Literacy collections are available at all locations.
Black Heritage - Vaughan Public Libraries' Black Heritage Collection was begun on February 25, 1989. It was the first of its kind in York Region, and is housed at Dufferin Clark Library.
Cinema Collection - This collection is housed at Pierre Berton Resource Library and Bathurst Clark Resource Library. It features the work of important directors from around the world and films not made by the major studios or with big Hollywood budgets. Award-winning films from world cinema festivals can be found in this collection.
English as a Second Language – This collection includes books, DVDs, and kits of books and audio or CD-ROM to meet the needs English Language learners. Of particular note are book chat sets of short novels at various learning levels, and TOEFL, IELTS, and other test preparation materials.
Government Documents – Housed at the Bathurst Clark Resource Library, the Government Documents collection offers access to Federal and Provincial Government documents, including statistics, policy and research papers, and other historical records.
Local Studies – This collection is especially useful for genealogists, those wishing to construct family trees, and local researchers needing access to current and historical municipal documents. The Local Studies Collection assists contains information concerning the history of Vaughan as a township, a town and finally a city. This collection now features VPL’s first digital local history project “Villages to City: An Oral History of Vaughan”.
Professional Collection – The professional collection offers access to resources for public and school library professionals. Topics covered range from program planning, to collection development, to library management. The professional collection is housed at the Bathurst Clark Resource Library.
