= Knowledge Ontario =

- Company type: Non Profit
- Industry: Information Services
- Founded: 2006
- Defunct: December 31, 2012
- Fate: dissolved
- Headquarters: Toronto, Ontario, Canada
- Website: knowledgeontario.ca

Knowledge Ontario was a non-profit organization supporting a number of related province-wide initiatives in Ontario, Canada, providing library and information resources, learning experiences and related services to people across all ages, locations, education levels and cultural institutions. It comprised five projects: Ask Ontario (or askON), Connect Ontario, Learn Ontario, Our Ontario and Resource Ontario, as well as the eResources Portal, which was launched in 2010. Knowledge Ontario ceased operations on December 31, 2012.

== History ==
Knowledge Ontario, formerly known as the Ontario Digital Library, was first conceptualized in the early-2000s during consultations between the Ontario Library Association (OLA) and provincial stakeholders representing Ontario's public libraries, colleges, universities, public schools, and government ministries. In 2003, OLA and the Knowledge Network for Learning (OKNL) submitted a business plan for the proposed organization to the Government of Ontario, and in 2004 the Ontario Ministry of Culture provided the organization with an initial grant of $750,000 to further develop project plans. Knowledge Ontario remained an entity under OLA until its incorporation in 2006. In the same year, the organization received $8 million in provincial funding from the Ministry of Culture and launched its first three services: Our Ontario, Ask Ontario, and Resource Ontario. Since then, Knowledge Ontario has also launched Connect Ontario, Learn Ontario, and the eResources Portal.

=== Awards ===
- 2008 - Ontario Library Association President's Award for Exceptional Achievement
- 2008 - OLITA Award for Technology Innovation in Libraries - for the Our Ontario portal
- 2010 - Canadian Library Association/Information Today Award for innovative technology
- 2010 - Information Technology Hero Award Finalist
- 2011 - OSLA Award for Special Achievement for David Thornley (Knowledge Ontario's Executive Director) and Peter Rogers (Board Chair)

== Projects and Services ==
=== Ask Ontario ===
Also known as askON and ONdemande, Ask Ontario was launched in 2008 as Ontario's first collaborative chat-based virtual reference service with partner libraries from universities, colleges, and public libraries. Through the service, Ontarians can chat in real-time with an information specialist who can help them find research and other web-based information materials. Each partner contributes staff time towards a collaborative schedule. Today, askON is a college library chat and SMS service managed by the Ontario Colleges Library Service (OCLS).

=== Connect Ontario ===
Connect Ontario is currently partnered with BiblioCommons and BC Libraries to create and promote its next generation online public access catalogue. The service is unique in that it merges search catalogue capabilities with easy-to-use social media tools. Oakville Public Library, the first institution to pilot the catalogue, went live with BiblioCommons in July 2008. Since then, more than a dozen Ontario public libraries have rolled out the BiblioCommons catalogue.

"Bibliocommons is attempting to transform online library catalogues into social discovery environments," said the Globe and Mail's Jennifer Hollet in 2009. "Think Amazon.com for libraries. The Bibliocommons technology is able to decorate catalogues with member comments, ratings, lists, suggested similar titles, and quotes."

=== Learn Ontario ===
Learn Ontario provides online tech tutorials for a wide range of software, applications, and social media tool sets. The service was officially launched in 2010, and is currently partnered with Atomic Learning.

=== Our Ontario ===
Our Ontario is a collective undertaking that aims to centralize access to the historic collections that are part of the province's libraries, archives, museums, and other cultural institutions. The project's online portal officially launched in 2007 as an access point to digitized documents, images and objects from Ontario's past. Since then, the portal has grown to include historic newspapers and government documents, and now features more than 1.4 million records.

The back-end of the portal is managed by VITA, a web-based software tool developed by Knowledge Ontario to provide cultural organizations with the means to create and manage data, digital objects, and collections.

Our Ontario also works in collaboration with the Southern Ontario Library Service (SOLS) and Ontario Library Service-North (OLS-N) to digitize objects at the local level. SOLS currently funds the digitization project through a $15 million grant from the Ontario Government.

=== Resource Ontario ===
Resource Ontario licenses a selection of e-resources on behalf of Ontario's school boards, colleges, and universities. The current list of content includes more than 50 academic and general-interest databases from Career Cruising, EBSCO, Rosen Publishing, and the Gale Group. The sector representatives that sit on Resource Ontario's steering committee conduct surveys and work with partnering organizations to ensure that the content licensed by Knowledge Ontario reflects a balance among the disciplines.

=== eResources Portal ===
Launched August 2010, the eResources Portal makes the e-resources available through Resource Ontario freely accessible to all Ontarians.

== Partners and Funders ==
Libraries and other educational and cultural institutions
6500 organizations including:
- publicly funded public, school, university, college and government libraries
- cultural institutions such as museums, archives and historical societies
- Ontario municipalities
Professional Associations
- Ontario Library Association
Public Library Federations
- Federation of Ontario Public Libraries
- Southern Ontario Library Service
- Ontario Library Services – North
Academic Library Federations
- Ontario Council of University Libraries
- Heads of Libraries and Learning Resources of Ontario
School Library Associations
- Council of Ontario Directors of Education
- Ontario School Libraries Association
- The Association of Library Coordinators and Consultants of Ontario
Vendors
- Atomic Learning
- BiblioCommons
- Career Cruising
- Ebsco
- Gale Cengage
- Rosen Publishing

== Board of directors ==
Knowledge Ontario is governed by a 13-member Board of Directors. Eight of these members are appointed by and are intended to reflect the interests of lead stakeholder groups (public libraries, university and college library systems and school libraries/school boards). The remaining five members of the Board include the executive director of the Ontario Library Association, a representative of the broader cultural sector and three other members designed to reflect additional strategic considerations as they change over time.

The current board of directors members are:

=== Public Libraries ===
Sam Coghlan, CEO, Stratford Public Library

=== College Libraries ===
Gladys Watson, Director, Learning Resource Centres, Centennial College

Janice Beatty, Vice President, Human Resources and Student Services, Sault College

=== University Libraries ===
Ken Hernden, Chief Librarian, Algoma University

Sharon Brown, Chief Librarian, Wilfrid Laurier University

=== School Libraries ===
John Stadnyk, Director of Education, Huron-Superior Catholic District School Board

Philip Jeffrey, Manager of Library & Information Service, Hamilton Wentworth Catholic District School Board

=== At Large Members ===
Shelagh Paterson, Executive Director, Ontario Library Association

Peter Rogers, Chair Person (former Chair of Management Group)

Michael Bator, CEO, Catholic Curriculum Corporation

Jessica Kamphorst, Director of Advancement, Canadian Institute for Advanced Research

== The Newman Report: Third Generation Public Libraries ==
In 2008, Wendy Newman, a Senior Fellow and Lecturer at the University of Toronto's iSchool, released a report commissioned by the Ontario Ministry of Culture titled Third Generation Public Libraries. In the study she concludes that Knowledge Ontario is one of the keys to advancing the province's knowledge-based economy.

From the report:

The opportunity posed by Knowledge Ontario is not just provision of information and content services equitably across Ontario, but the platform for collaboration within a sector (public, school, post-secondary) that encompasses formal and informal learning, in an Ontario economy that must become ever more knowledge based. It is also the natural foundation for private sector partnership (e.g., in software development). Knowledge Ontario began with one-time funding. It will require a stable financial foundation and a policy commitment to additional partnerships with education and post-secondary ministries, with which it shares a community of interest, to reach its full potential.

== Cessation ==
Knowledge Ontario has ceased operations, effective December 31, 2012.
