= Joel A. Sutherland =

Canadian author

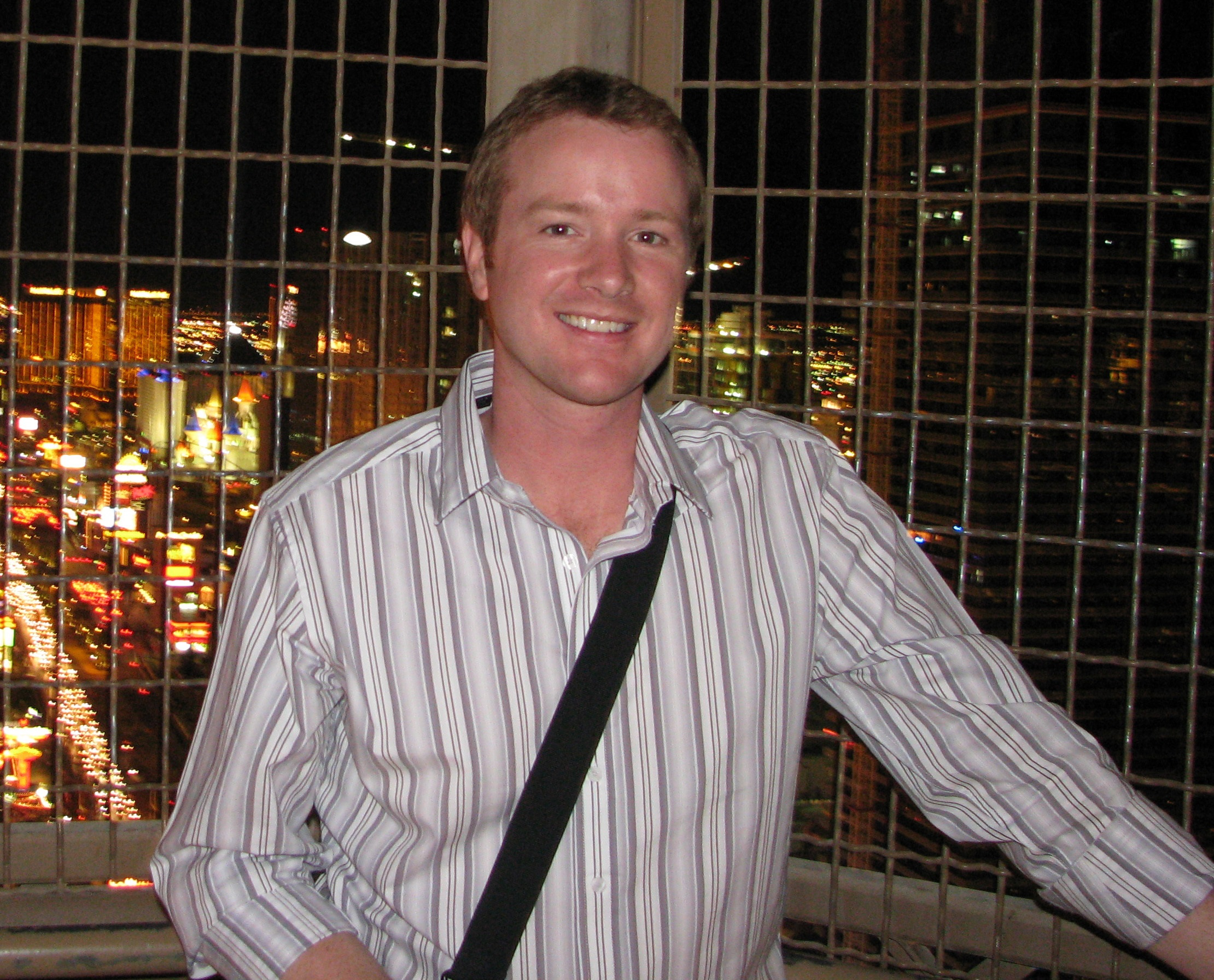
- Joel A. Sutherland in Las Vegas following the Bram Stoker Awards, 2009
- Born: Joel Alexander Sutherland; 1 December 1980 (age 45); Oakville, Ontario, Canada
- Education: York University (B.F.A.); Aberystwyth University (M.L.I.S.)
- Occupations: Author & Librarian
- Writing career
- Period: 2008–present (published)
- Genre: Horror
- Notable awards: Silver Birch Award (2016 & 2017), Hackmatack Award (2015 & 2016)
- Website: joelasutherland.com

Joel A. Sutherland (born 1 December 1980) is a Canadian author of thriller, horror and fantasy short stories and novels, anthologies and children's books. His notable works include Frozen Blood and the Haunted Canada series. Sutherland's writing has won the Forest of Reading Silver Birch Award and the Hackmatack Award, and been nominated for the Forest of Reading Red Maple Award, the Bram Stoker Award and the Black Quill Award. He lives in Courtice, Ontario.

Sutherland was born in Oakville, Ontario. He graduated with a BFA in Film & Video Production studies from York University, Toronto, in 2003 and obtained a Master of Library and Information Science degree from Aberystwyth University, Wales, in 2012. He is the Director, Community and Service Development at the Whitby Public Library. He has also worked at the Georgina Public Libraries, Ajax Public Library, Pickering Public Library , in a hockey stick factory, at a pizza restaurant, in a bar, at a men's suit retailer and at a bookstore. He was also a member of the Governor General's Foot Guards during the summer of 2000.

His first published story was "Something Fishy This Way Comes" in The Undead: Skin & Bones (Permuted Press). Frozen Blood has been said to have been inspired by the Great Ice Storm of 1998.

In October 2010, it was announced that Sutherland had been selected as a contestant for the first season of Wipeout Canada, which aired on TVtropolis in the Spring of 2011. He made it to the third round on the Beauties vs. Geeks episode.

https://whitbylibrary.ca/contactus

== List of published works ==
- Frozen Blood (Lachesis Publishing, 2008)
- Be a Writing Superstar (Scholastic Canada, 2010)
- Haunted Canada 4: More True Tales of Terror (Scholastic Canada, 2014)
- Haunted Canada 5: Terrifying True Stories (Scholastic Canada, 2015)
- Haunted Canada 6: More Terrifying True Stories (Scholastic Canada, 2016)
- Summer's End (Scholastic Canada, 2017)
- Haunted Canada 7: Chilling True Tales (Scholastic Canada, 2017)
- Haunted: The House Next Door (Scholastic Canada, 2017)
- Haunted: Kill Screen (Scholastic Canada, 2017)
- Haunted Canada 8: More Chilling True Tales (Scholastic Canada, 2018)
- Haunted: Night of the Living Dolls (Scholastic Canada, 2018)
- Haunted: Field of Screams (Scholastic Canada, 2019)
