= Innisfil Public Library =

Coordinates: 44.1919°N 79.6979°W

- Type: public library system in Stroud, Cookstown, and Alcona
- Branches: 3

Collection
- Items collected: business directories, phone books, maps, government publications, books, periodicals, genealogy, local history,

Other information
- Website: Innisfil Public Library

The Innisfil Public Library is a public library system in Ontario, Canada. The library is a three-branch system. Each branch provides unique services to the community. The branches are located in Stroud, Cookstown, and Alcona. The Churchill Branch of Innisfil Library was closed in 2022.

== History ==
Documents state that as early as 1898, there was a library board in existence in Cookstown. In the early 1900s, books were housed in a building near what is now the intersection of Highways 27 and 89. Over the years, the library moved several times and was run by different boards until 1964. At that time the library board moved the books to the present location, then known as the Veterans Hall. Following the 1991 amalgamation process, Cookstown Public Library became a branch of the Innisfil Public Library system.

The first board meeting of the Lefroy Library Board took place in 1902 at the Ancient Order of the United Workmans Hall. Mrs. T. Sproule was hired as librarian and the library was opened in her home in Lefroy on the northwest corner of Church Street and Concession 4. The library made one other move in Lefroy before moving to the James Sloan building in Churchill in 1912. Miss Mary Sloan was appointed librarian in 1915, and served as librarian there for 64 years, before retiring in 1978. The Churchill library moved several times until the Innisfil Central Library, referred to as the Churchill branch, officially opened in 1974. The Stroud library, founded by the Stroud Women’s Institute, was located in Chantler’s General Store in 1912. The library moved through many buildings in Stroud, including the Orange Hall in 1950, and the basement of the old municipal offices in 1957. The library opened in its current location, the Stroud Recreation Complex, December 22, 1975.

In the 1990s, there was a push to give the fast-growing community of Alcona a library. Even though there was support in principle for a library in the community, there was no budget funding to make a library happen. The community rallied, and a small private library, funded by a group of volunteers, was opened in 1994.

The goal of the Innisfil Library Board, as recommended in the Fox Jones Study, was to give the community a municipally funded library. The council approved funds for the building of a new library in Alcona in 2000. Tenders went out, decisions were made, a fund-raising campaign was initiated, and after several delays, the new Lakeshore branch was officially opened in October 2001.

== See also ==
- Ontario Public Libraries
- Ask Ontario
