= Richmond Hill Public Library (disambiguation) =

Richmond Hill Public Library may refer to:

- Richmond Hill Public Library, in Richmond Hill, Ontario, Canada.
- Richmond Hill Public Library, a branch of the Statesboro Regional Public Libraries in Georgia.
