= BiblioCommons =

Canadian library software developer

- Industry: Software
- Headquarters: Toronto, Canada
- Parent: Constellation Software (2020-present)
- Website: www.bibliocommons.com

BiblioCommons is a privately held company, based in Toronto, Ontario, Canada, that develops front end interactive catalog and web services for libraries. In February 2020, BiblioCommons was acquired by Volaris Group, an operating segment of Constellation Software.

Over 200 public libraries in four countries, worldwide, currently use a BiblioCommons OPAC (Online Public Access Catalog). BiblioCore, the online catalog, integrates with existing Integrated Library Systems (ILSs) and creates a complete OPAC replacement that features searching, account integration, new tools for discovery, eBook integration, library staff recommendations, and the ability to create a community around the library collection.

Other services include a mobile suite with BiblioMobile; the ability to manage web sites that have dynamic web options with BiblioWeb (a content management system); to integrate summer reading microsites with Biblio Summer Sites; to make public library resources available through school library catalogs with BiblioSchools; to integrate ebook lending and buying within the catalog with BiblioDigital; and to integrate event listings straight into the catalog with BiblioEvents. There are more options, modules, and improvements being worked on all the time.

In 2008, Library Journal called BiblioCommons "a revolutionary social discovery system for libraries".

BiblioCommons has an arrangement with Knowledge Ontario that makes it Knowledge Ontario's "Connect Ontario" project.

== Origins ==
BiblioCommons began not as a software company, but as a nonprofit youth literacy initiative. Co-founder Beth Jefferson was interested in the ways teens were using emerging technologies to engage with popular culture and wondered how youth literacy could be improved if a social context around reading could be established online. The perF!nk Project (Perceive. Feel. Think) that emerged won a national award from the Information Technology Association of Canada (ITAC) and began attracting broader attention – particularly, from libraries.

=== From perF!nk to BiblioCommons ===
Asking questions, the team began to explore the potential leverage of the public library’s online catalog for the end user. Could they create conversation and engagement where people already were, in the library’s web catalog?

The perf!nk project caught the attention of the Ontario Library Association, which committed research funding. Over the next 18 months, BiblioCommons conducted surveys and more than 100 one-on-one interviews in four library systems to explore the possibilities for re-envisioning the library catalog. Three Canadian provincial agencies were sufficiently impressed with the research and resulting vision to fund prototypes, and ultimately to purchase advance subscriptions. Their early commitments enabled BiblioCommons to build the envisioned services and roll them out to interested libraries in those jurisdictions.

=== From beta to production ===
Following 18 months of user research and a year-long beta test, with six libraries, as well as ongoing research and feedback, BiblioCommons created prototypes of the BiblioCore catalog and improved scalability, usability, and configurability before rolling out to broader audiences.

BiblioCommons re-launched its re-designed services to several large systems in late 2009.

== Searching and rating ==
The basic BiblioCore search box is built with automatic relevance ranking algorithms, data mapping, faceted searches, natural language detection, and a "did-you-mean?" functionality to make searching the online public library catalog easier and more intuitive. Advanced searches allow a user to narrow down their query by format, location, availability, topic, publication date, tag, and more.

Users that are logged into the library system can add tags to books, ratings, age recommendations, book reviews, and more. Anything added to the BiblioCore catalog can be seen by other users on the BiblioCommons system, making the library catalog a larger, more diverse and more robust online community.

Users can also create shelves with which to group books; create "completed", "in progress", and "for later" shelves to manage and sequence their reading progress; and follow other library users for book recommendations and reviews.

== Other products ==
BiblioCommons also offers other modules and products that work with BiblioCore for public libraries.

- Biblio Summer Sites is a suite of micro-sites that can be added to a library catalog to create summer reading groups for kids, teens, and adults. The sites have customizable avatars, badges that can be won or awarded, reading goals, reading challenges, and quizzes.
- BiblioWeb is a complete content management system for library websites.
- BiblioCore replaces all the traditional functionality of the library's online catalog and integrates it with discovery and interactive experiences that library customers experience daily elsewhere on the web. It replaces the traditional library OPAC (online public access catalog).
- BiblioDigital is an eBook platform that allows libraries to deliver eBooks through the catalog, instead of through a separate third-party website. It is designed to work with any eBook vendor, so that libraries can showcase their books in one interface, and users can access and read their eBooks through a library-centric environment. BiblioDigital went live in beta in May 2013.
- BiblioEvents integrates event creation and program features into the library catalog.
- BiblioMobile is offered as a module for BiblioCore and is a suite of apps for Android, iPhone, and other mobile browsers. It creates a mobile-friendly library catalog and website for users on all platforms.
- BiblioSchools makes the entire resources of the public library available to school students and educators through the school library catalog. Currently, it supports the Destiny ILS by Follett.

== Libraries using BiblioCommons ==
As of April 2014, BiblioCommons has been adopted by over 200 libraries in Australia, Canada, New Zealand, and the United States, and has over 10 million registered BiblioCommons users.

BiblioCommons beta tested at Oakville Public Library, Ontario. Testing started in July 2008.

The second library network to launch BiblioCommons was the Perth County Information Network in Ontario, which includes Perth East Public Library, Stratford Public Library, and West Perth Public Library. The library network went live with BiblioCommons in August 2009 and officially launched in October 2009.

Libraries using the BiblioCommons catalog include: the Boston Public Library, Carnegie Library of Pittsburgh, Chicago Public Library, Christchurch City Libraries, Edmonton Public Library, Multnomah County Public Library, Ottawa Public Library, Princeton Public Library, Seattle Public Library, Vancouver Public Library, Yarra Plenty Regional Library, and many others.

The Chicago Public Library system went live with the BiblioCore catalog in 2013 and launched their website based on BiblioCMS in April 2014. The Cincinnati and Hamilton County Public Library introduced its version of the BiblioCore catalog, revamped BiblioWeb site, and BiblioApps mobile interface in August 2020.

Toronto Public Library became a BiblioCommons partner in June 2025, and rolled out the full online catalogue in January 2026.

The Brooklyn Public Library, New York Public Library, and CLEVNET previously used BiblioCommons, but have since returned to using discovery systems provided by their ILS vendors.

== ILS integration ==
BiblioCore works by integrating with a library's current Integrated Library System (ILS).

The ILSs that BiblioCommons currently works with are: Carl-X, Evergreen, Horizon, Millennium, Polaris, Sierra, Symphony, SirsiDynix, and VTLS.

== Privacy ==
BiblioCommons collects some personally identifiable information, such as library card number, from users who access their library account from the service. BiblioCommons secures and encrypts all personal information provided by the user during the registration process. BiblioCommons does not share information or activity with ad networks or other entities that are not directly involved in the library's services, and does not store any information regarding a user's borrowing data, book history, or recently returned items. Nonetheless, the fact that BiblioCommons collects personally identifiable information at all has raised concerns, which persist into 2019.
