= Natalie Turner =

Natalie Turner is a Canadian animator, effects animator, and animation professor.

Turner's career started in 1989, when she was hired by Sullivan Bluth Studios as a special effects assistant, working on animated feature films A Troll in Central Park and Rock-A-Doodle. She then moved on to Nelvana in 1991, to work as a character assistant for the television series Rupert and the Cloud Pilot.

From Nelvana, Turner moved on to feature films, working as a character assistant on Titan AE, and an effect assistant on Space Jam for Warner Brothers Animation, Beauty and the Beast: The Enchanted Christmas at Disney's Toronto animation studios, and Looney Tunes: Back in Action for Warner Brothers Animation.

Turner is currently a professor for the Classical Animation program at Sheridan College in Oakville. Previously she taught for Max the Mutt Animation School in Toronto. She will teach the fifth year of the Animex (Animation Exploration) workshop at Visual Arts Brampton Creative Studio.
