= VPL =

VPL or Vpl may refer to:

- VPL (brand), an American fashion label
- Vancouver Public Library, public library system in Vancouver, British Columbia
- Vaughan Public Libraries, public library system in Vaughan, Ontario
- Ventral posterolateral nucleus, a part of the thalamus in the brain
- Victorian Premier League, the second & third highest association football league in Victoria, Australia
- VPL Research, a company started by Jaron Lanier
- Viipuri Province, a former province of Finland
- Visible panty line, visible underwear beneath somebody's outer clothing
- Visibly pushdown language, a kind of formal language
- ViRC Programming Language, a programming interface for Visual IRC
- Visual programming language, a style of programming language
- Kodak Vericolor II, Type L film
