= Wasaga Beach Public Library =

Library in Wasaga Beach, Ontario, Canada

- 44.528333°N 79.995833°W
- Location: Wasaga Beach, Ontario, Canada
- Type: Public library
- Branches: 1

Collection
- Size: 30,000

Other information
- Director: Jennifer Jones
- Website: wasagabeachpubliclibrary.ca

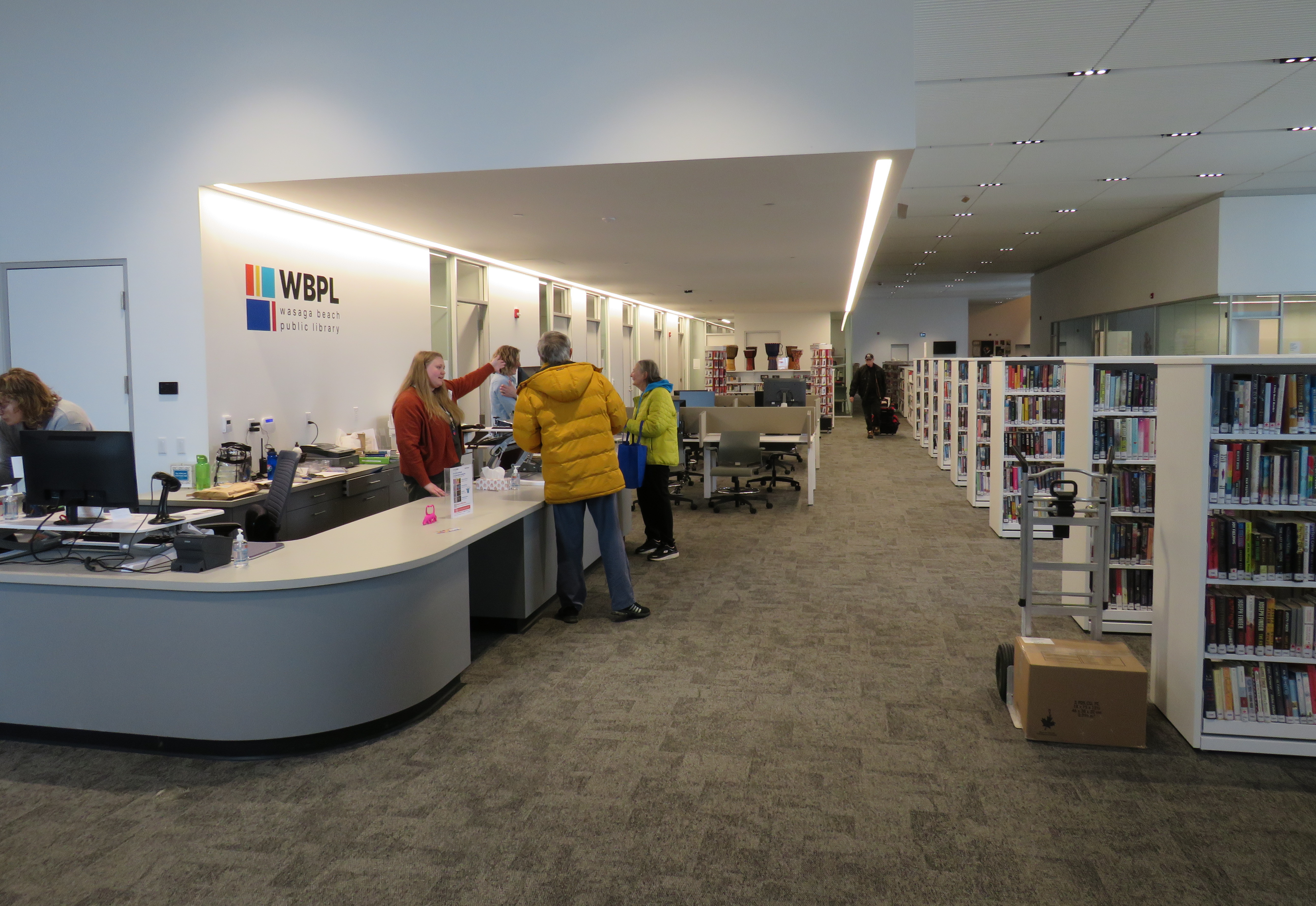
Interior of new library shortly after opening in January 2024

The Wasaga Beach Public Library is a public library that serves Wasaga Beach, Ontario in Canada. It is governed by a board of trustees appointed by the town council of Wasaga Beach. The chief librarian is Jennifer Jones, and the Canadian library symbol is OWAB.

The collection includes adult and junior fiction and non-fiction books, large-print books, audiobooks, e-books, DVDs, and picture books. The library also has accessibility features, including large-print keyboards and screen magnification software. The library also operates a Books on Wheels program.

The original library was a 1,754 square feet (163 m^{2}) building built in 1972. It was replaced by a 4,500 square feet (418 m^{2}) building in 1994. In 2019, construction of a third 17,252 square foot (1,603 m^{2}) library was announced by the town, as part of joint facility which included a new twin-pad hockey arena. The project broke ground in September 2021, and was expected to be completed in the summer of 2023. The new combined library/arena complex opened on January 27, 2024 (six months later than anticipated), with free public skating on the hockey rinks. The complex sits on the site of the former Wasaga Waterworld, a waterpark that operated from 1982 to 2007.

== See also ==
- Ontario Public Libraries
