= Aurora Public Library (Ontario) =

Public library in Ontario, Canada

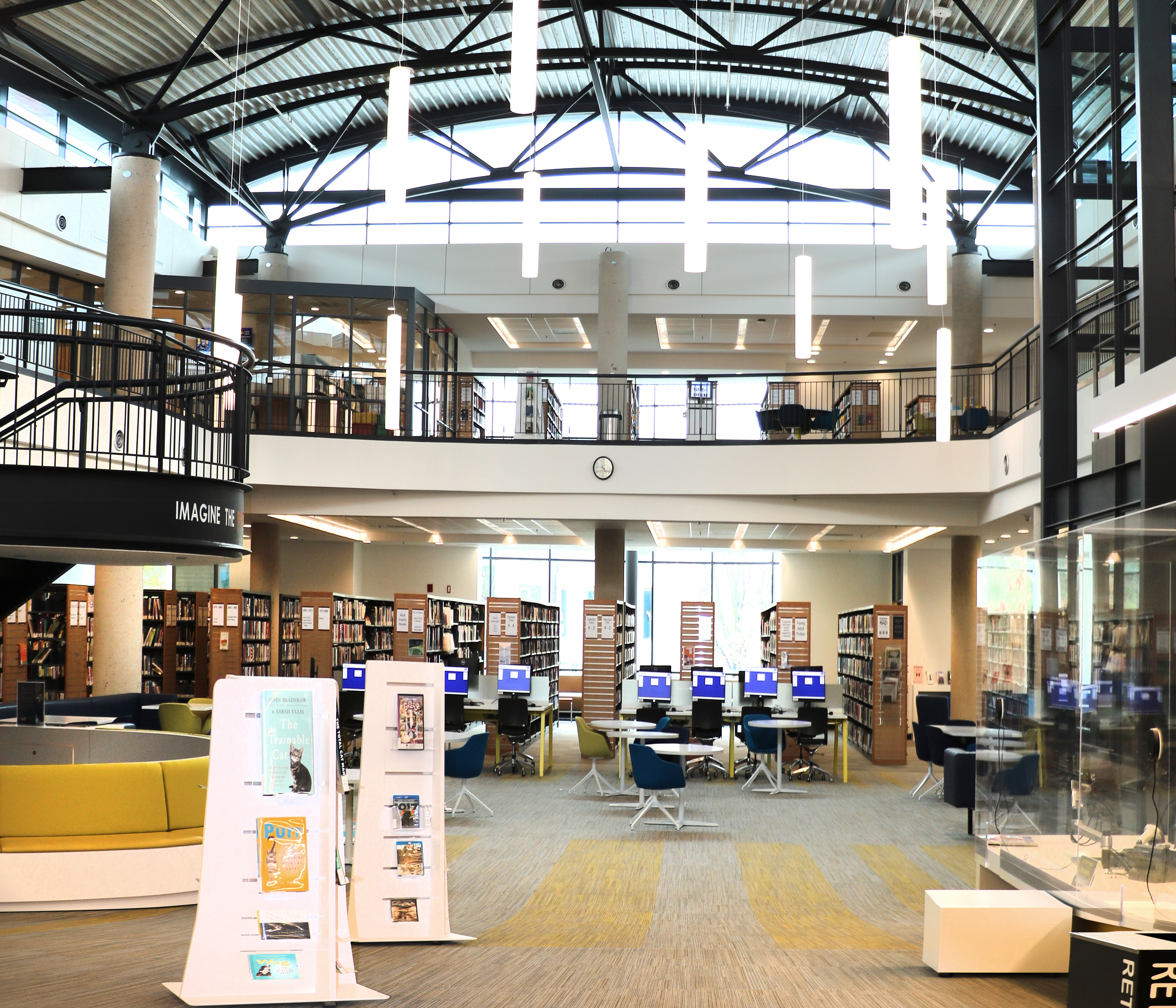
- Interior of the Aurora Public Library
- 43°59′49″N 79°28′00″W
- Location: 15145 Yonge Street; Aurora, Ontario, Canada; L4G 1M1
- Established: 1855

Collection
- Size: Over 256,643

Access and use
- Circulation: 630,553
- Population served: Local population of Aurora, Ontario

Other information
- Director: Jodi Marr
- Website: aurorapl.ca

The Aurora Public Library is located in Aurora, Ontario, Canada. The library has a collection of more than 256,643 items and has over 25,406 registered users.

== History ==
A free library was organized in Aurora by local Quakers in the early 1820s. In 1855, the Aurora Association for the Diffusion of Helpful Knowledge was established, to provide weekly lectures and concerts in the town. It was later renamed to Aurora Mechanics Institute and Library Association. By 1863, it had accumulated a collection of 500 books and opened as a reading room for two hours each Friday. In 1868, the organization built The Mechanics Hall at the southeast corner of Mosley Street and Victoria Street.

In 1895, the town established a Public Library Association following a provincial Act passed in April of that year, and the town council appointed a Board of Management for the association.

In 1920, the library's assets are absorbed into a Municipal Public Library established per the 1882 Free Libraries Act of Ontario, and is moved into the town hall on the northeast corner of Yonge Street and Mosley Street. A children's section is added to the library in 1926, with access for children restricted to Saturday afternoons.

In 1945, the library moved to Health Hall (now Victoria Hall) on the southwest corner of Mosley Street and Victoria Street, and in 1963, it moved to a new 4,500 square feet (420 m^{2}) building at 56 Victoria Street as part of Aurora's centennial celebration. By 1967, it had a collection of 14,900 items and 5,236 members. Renovations in 1976 and 1979 resulted in a 13,000-square-foot (1,200 m^{2}) expansion of the library building to serve Aurora's growing population.

In 2001, the library moved to its current location, a 44,375-square-foot (4,122.6 m^{2}) facility on the northeast corner of Yonge Street and Church Street. Renovations were undertaken from October 2018 to January 2019 to create a multipurpose room and add a Creative Studio space, to improve lighting, and to create a "living room" space to accommodate library programming.

AS a result of the COVID-19 pandemic, the library laid off 28 of its 33 employees in 2020.

In 2024, the adjacent property was opened as a town square, as was a skyway connecting the library to the Aurora Cultural Centre and Aurora Museum and Archives. Later that year, a seed library was established.

In July 2025, the library had a ribbon-cutting ceremony for a self-serve book kiosk installed at the Stronach Aurora Recreation Complex.

== See also ==
- Ask Ontario
- List of public libraries in Ontario
