= Southern Ontario Library Service =

The Southern Ontario Library Service (SOLS) was a "non-scheduled agency" of the Ontario Ministry of Tourism and Culture in the Canadian province of Ontario. Established in 1989, SOLS delivers programs and services to Ontario public libraries in the southern half of the province, in a geographic area bounded by Windsor in the south, to Ottawa and the Quebec border in the east, and as far north as Muskoka. Almost 200 library systems are included in this group, ranging from libraries in small communities to libraries in cities with populations in the hundreds of thousands. The Ontario Library Service North (OLS-North) performs equivalent service for the northern portion of the province.

SOLS mission statement is as follows: "The people of Ontario, as represented by the Minister with jurisdiction for public libraries, will have equitable access to library services at a sustainable cost."

SOLS is responsible for a number of services.

- Manage the province wide resource sharing network (interlibrary loan) and the related courier service
- Providing libraries with information and advice on management, governance, and accreditation issues
- Managing and supporting numerous training and library skills development programs
- Providing opportunities for libraries to network and exchange information, both face to face and electronically
- Managing shared electronic, print and non-print collections
- Operate a catalogue system
- Technical support

As a result of budget cuts to the Ontario Ministry of Tourism and Culture in the 2019 Ontario budget, the budget for SOLS was reduced by 50% from $3 million to $1.5 million. A spokesperson for Michael Tibollo, the Minister of Tourism, Culture and Sport, stated that SOLS and OLS-North are "arms-length agencies that have no involvement in the day-to-day operations of Ontario’s public libraries".

The interlibrary loan network was operated using a van delivery system and postal service. The van delivery program was terminated after the budget cuts, eliminating 24 delivery driver jobs, and the full program was discontinued on 26 April 2019. Tibollo stated in a letter that the van-based program, which cost about $1.3 million per year, was "very inefficient" and could be replaced "by using mail, at less than 25 per cent of the existing cost".

The program had also provided delivery service between branches of some library systems, for example the four branches of King Township Public Library. It also resulted in the cancellation of interlibrary loan from other provinces; library systems may honour such requests, but must fund the program instead of using SOLS.

In 2019, the executive director of the Ontario Library Association stated that SOLS and OLS-North "provide highly valued services".

The Southern Ontario Library Service (SOLS) was merged with the Ontario Library Service - North (OLSN) to create the Ontario Library Service in 2021.
