= Visual Arts Brampton =

Coordinates: 43.66753°N 79.733266°W

Visual Arts Brampton is a non-profit community art group located in Brampton, Ontario formed in 1986 to organize the arts community, providing workshops, and exhibits, among other things.

The group moved to its current studio in 1991.

The first juried show, under the guise of Brampton Arts Council, featured 68 artworks judged by Pamela Wachna, curator of Toronto's Market Gallery.

== Galleries ==
Visual Arts Brampton runs The Artway Family of Galleries, which includes Artway Gallery (established in 1998) and the Artway Invitational Gallery (established 2010), all in Shoppers World Brampton. Artway was previously in Bramalea City Centre.

The Chinguacousy branch of the Brampton Library had a gallery space, opened when the facility first did in 1971. The space had its own full-time curator until a renovation in the 1990s. The group managed booking for the space for around a year, before passing the responsibility on to the Art Gallery of Peel. It was slated for closure in 1996, and VAB petitioned to keep it open. After the closure, the non-profit fundraised to open a new space in Bramalea City Centre, City Centre Exhibit Space for a while, before being renamed Artway Gallery.

The group's annual floral art exhibit, started in 2002 at the Brampton City Hall atrium gallery space. In 2010, the first year the group featured work exclusively created for the exhibit, the art toured from City Hall to Carabram's Canada pavilion, Artway Invitational Gallery, the Canadian National Exhibition, and Brampton Library's Four Corners branch.
