= Oakville Public Library =

Library system in Oakville, Ontario, Canada

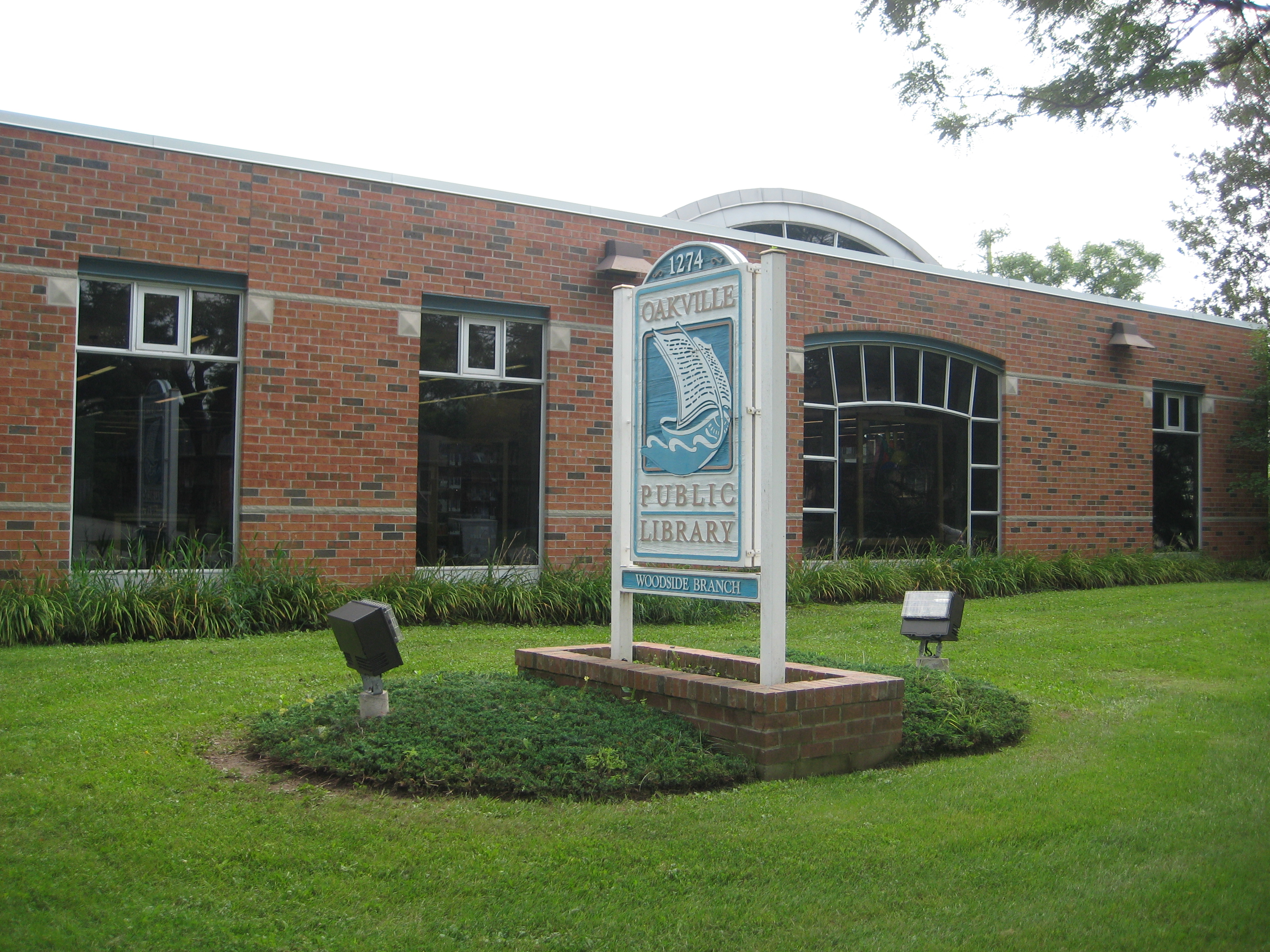
- Woodside branch
- 43.44394°N 79.67093°W (Central branch)
- Type: Public library system for the Town of Oakville
- Established: 1827
- Branches: 7 branches, various express and outreach locations

Collection
- Items collected: books, audiobooks, movies, music, business directories, maps, government publications, periodicals, genealogy, local history

Other information
- Website: opl.ca

Oakville Public Library is the public library system for the Town of Oakville, Ontario, Canada.

Through its seven branches, website and various express and outreach locations, the Oakville Public Library (also known as OPL) provides a wide range of services for Oakville residents. In 2023, OPL had over 67,000 active cardholders with over 4,198,000 physical and digital materials in circulation

The Library has over 232,100 books and CD audiobooks in its collection.

== Services ==
- Books, movies and music
- Programs for children, youth and adults
- Online resources (research, career development, health information)
- Local history and family history
- Community services (Information Oakville database, food program, newcomer resources, services directory)
- Internet, computer and laptop access
- More than books (sports kits, regional and provincial park passes, seed library, loanable sports equipment)
- Information and reference services

== Branch Locations ==
- Central Branch, 120 Navy Street
- Glen Abbey Branch, 1415 Third Line
- Iroquois Ridge Branch, 1051 Glenashton Drive
- White Oaks Branch, 1070 McCraney Street East
- Woodside Branch, 1274 Rebecca Street
- Clearview Branch, 2860 Kingsway Drive
- Sixteen Mile Branch, 3070 Neyagawa Boulevard

== Brief history ==
In 1827, Oakville's first library was established when William Tassie, the town's first schoolmaster, opened a reading room in the meeting hall located on the site of the current central library. The first use of the name “Oakville Public Library” occurred in 1895. Between the 1860s and the 1960s, the library moved to four other locations in town, only to return to the Navy Street site in 1967 with the opening of the new Centennial complex housing the library and art gallery.

== See also ==
- Ontario Public Libraries
- Ask Ontario
