= Milton Public Library (Milton, Ontario) =

- 43°31′42.298″N 79°51′56.956″W
- Location: Milton, Ontario, Canada
- Established: 1855; 171 years ago
- Branches: 3

Other information
- Director: Sarah Douglas-Murray, CEO
- Website: beinspired.ca

The Milton Public Library (MPL) is a public library system that provides service to residents of Milton, Ontario. It was seven branches. It was a wide collection of books, CDs, DVDs, technology, and millions of digital resources. It is also host to a seed library. It was established in 1855 first as the Milton Mechanics' institute.

== History ==
The Milton Public Library was first founded as the Mechanics' institute of Milton in 1855. It was founded as a part of the Mechanics institute movement which originated in the United Kingdom and promoted self-education and "moral" means of entertainment. In 1857, the Mechanics' institute of Milton moved into the basement of the town council building and soon after moved into a former feed store on main street. The library ceased to affiliate with the Mechanics' institute in 1882 and became a publicly funded library with the passage of the Free libraries act of 1882.

In 1974, a main branch was built on the site of the Bruce Street School. In 2014, the main Branch moved to a new location at 1010 Main Street East. The Beatty Branch was opened in 2009 and the Sherwood Branch opened in 2019.

In 2025, MPL eliminated fines for children and teen materials.

== Governance ==
The Burlington Public Library is governed by a board appointed by Milton Town Council. The board is composed of four citizen members and three city councillors. This arrangement is in accordance with the Public Libraries Act, 1990.

== Services ==
=== Collections ===
The Milton Public Library has a collection of over 150,000 physical books, CDs, and movies.

==== Local History Collection ====
The Milton Public Library houses an archive of local historical materials. The Milton Public Library has a partnership with the Burlington Historical Society (BHS) to promote and research Burlington's history.

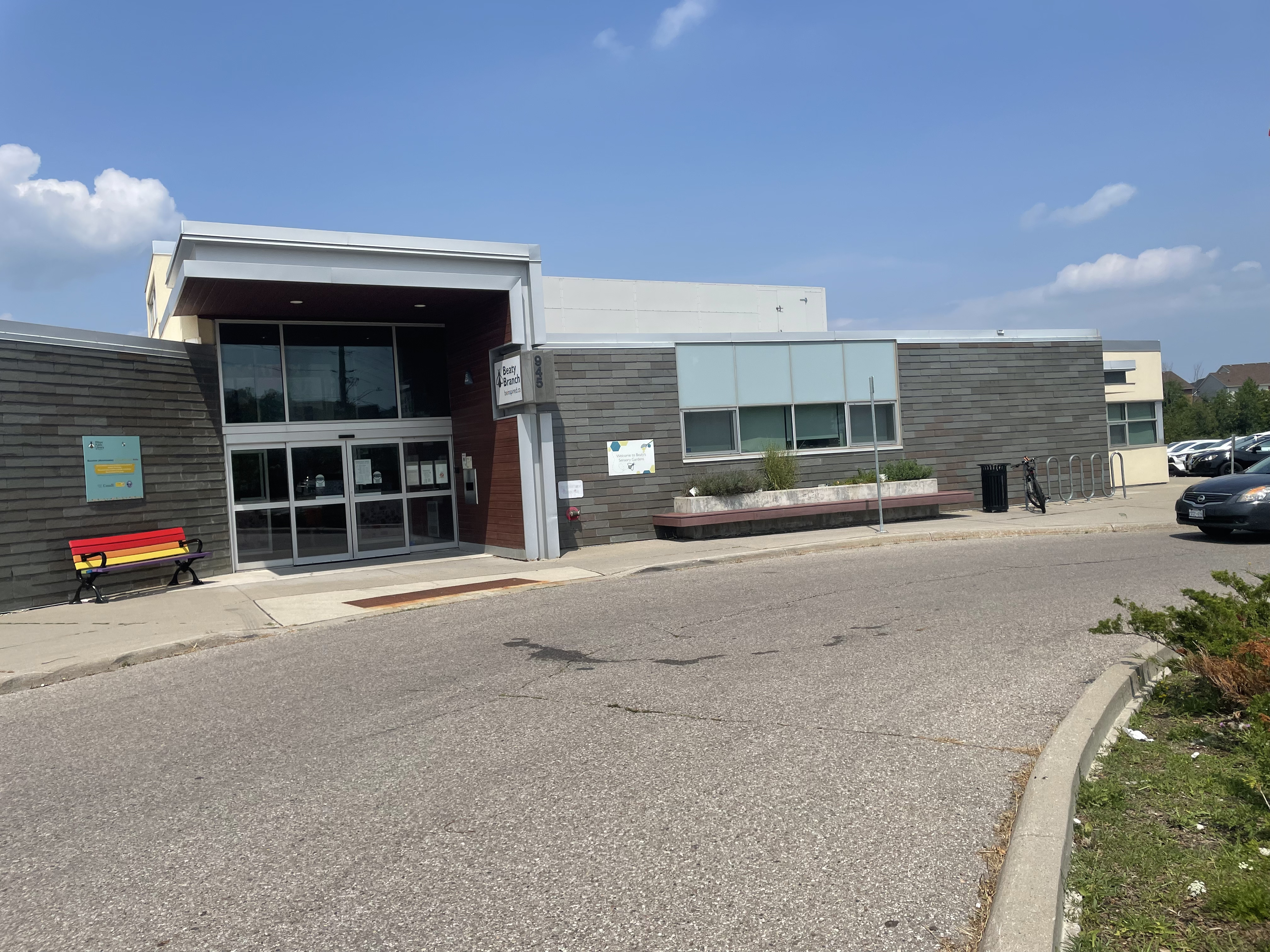
The Beaty Branch

== Branches ==
- Central Branch
- Beaty Branch
- Sherwood Branch
