= Ajax Public Library =

Public library system in Ontario, Canada

Coordinates: 43.8514°N 79.02088°W

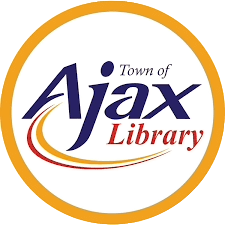
- Location: Ajax, Ontario, Canada
- Established: 1952
- Branches: 4

Collection
- Size: 235,000 (2022)

Access and use
- Circulation: 1,180,000 (2025)
- Population served: 126,666
- Members: 48,122 (2025)

Other information
- Budget: $6,706,600 (2023)
- Director: Sarah Vaisler
- Parent organization: Town of Ajax
- Website: ajaxlibrary.ca

Ajax Public Library is a public library system in Ajax, Ontario, Canada.

== History ==
The first Ajax Public Library opened December 13, 1952. This library contained 1,175 books and served a population of 4,057.

A new main branch was constructed in 1967 as a Centennial project. The new branch was built next to the original and led to a surge in library activity. In 1974, the boundaries of Ajax were expanded to include Pickering Village, which resulted in the Ajax Public Library absorbing the village's library into its network. This second branch was called the Village Branch. This would be the first time there would be more than one Ajax library branch. The Village Branch closed in 2019.

In 2023, the Library opened a Makerspace located inside the McLean Branch. In February 2023, Ajax Public Library and Grandview Kids signed a formal agreement, which included establishing an Ajax Public Library branch in Grandview Kids’ new Paediatric Centre of Excellence. This express branch opened in late 2024.

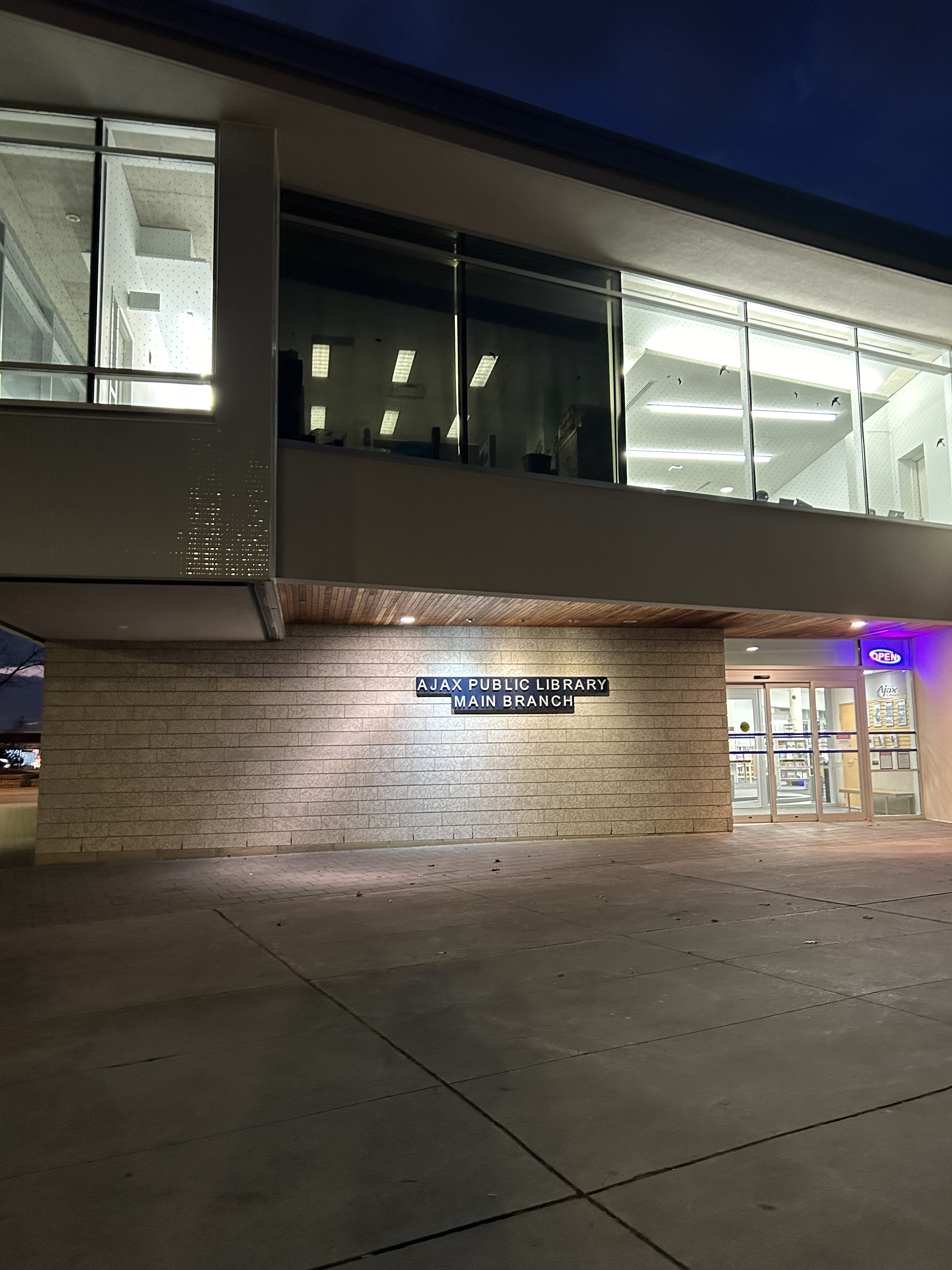
The current main branch built in the early 2000s.

== Governance ==
The Ajax Public Library is governed by a nine-member board appointed by Ajax Town Council. The board is composed of eight citizen members and one councillor.

== Services ==
=== Collections ===
The library's collection count is 235,000 items and includes books, movies, music, magazines, audiobooks, book club kits, and daisy readers.

=== Makerspace ===
The McLean branch contains a library makerspace. This workspace gives library card holders access to specialized equipment for a small fee. The Ajax Makerspace contains a vinyl cutting machine, 3d printer, soldering station, laser cutter, button/magnet maker, book/coil binder, and large format printer, among other digital tools.

=== Technology ===
All branches of the Ajax Public Library include public access to computers and free wireless internet. The library also loans mobile hotspots, which can be borrowed for up to 21 days.

==== Digital content ====
An Ajax Public Library card gives access to different online services such as audiobooks, e-books, comics, and graphic novels, digital newspapers and magazines, movies and TV shows, and music.

The library is partnered with Hoopla, which free offers access to different media such as audiobooks, ebooks, music and TV shows.

== Ajax Archives ==
The Ajax Archives was established by town council in 2010. In 2022, the management of the archives was transferred from the Town of Ajax to the Ajax Public Library. Ajax Archives preserves municipal records of permanent value and collects private records from individuals and organizations that help tell the story of the Town of Ajax. Its collection focuses on documenting the area’s historical development, the people who shaped the community, and the Town’s connection to HMS Ajax.

== Branches ==
| Branch | Address | Notes | Opened | Image |
|---|---|---|---|---|
| Main Branch | 55 Harwood Ave S, Ajax, ON L1S 2H8 | Part of the municipal complex that contains Ajax Town Hall. | 1967 | |
| McLean Branch | 95 Magill Dr, Ajax, ON L1T 4M5 | Contains a makerspace and is inside the McLean Community Centre. | 1994 | |
| Audley Branch | 1955 Audley Rd, Ajax, ON L1Z 1V6 | Located inside the Audley Recreation Centre. | 2019 | |
| Grandview Kids Express Branch | 1461 Harwood Ave N, Ajax, ON L1T 0R3 | Located inside Grandview Kids Ajax - The Jerry Coughlan Building | 2024 | |

The library previously operated the Village Library branch, which closed in 2019.

== See also ==
- List of public libraries in Ontario
