= Pickering Public Library =

Library system in Pickering, Ontario, Canada

Coordinates: 43.83730°N 79.08327°W

- Type: Public Library system of Pickering, Ontario
- Established: May 22, 1990; 36 years ago
- Branches: 3

Access and use
- Circulation: 1,308,654

Other information
- Director: Jackie Flowers
- Employees: 60
- Website: Pickering Public Library Website

Pickering Public Library is the library system of Pickering, Ontario, Canada. The library was operational in separate branches since 1841, but officially launched as the Main Library in 1990 at the Central Branch. There are also the George Ashe (formerly Petticoat Creek) and Claremont branches which remain part of the Pickering Public Library.

== History ==
The Pickering Public Library officially opened its doors on May 22, 1990, which is the Central Branch, after two years of construction in response to the Town of Pickering's growing needs. Prior to opening, there were various library branches including Greenwood, Claremont, Whitevale, Bay Ridges, Rouge Hill, Brougham, which was the first branch opened in 1841, and the formerly named Liverpool Branch until the official opening of the Central Branch. The former three branches remain open to this day. The Petticoat Creek Library branch opened their doors on June 14, 2001 and was officially renamed to the George Ashe Library on September 15, 2017.

In 2020, the library estimates to have 515,000 visitors, upwards of 60 permanent employees, almost 1 million items available to borrow, and almost 1.7 million uses of the public computers annually.

== Services ==
=== Collections ===
The library's collection count is almost 1 million items.

=== Assistive Services ===
The library offers services to patrons and Pickering residents with special needs. This includes a library delivery service for those who cannot visit the library due to disabilities, and a sign language interpretation service.

=== Technology ===
The Pickering Public Library technology services include public access computers and free wireless internet access across all three branches. The Library provides access to e-books, movies, music, and other electronic items. Each branch has a black-and-white printer where patrons can print for 10 cents a page. All branches also have a photocopier. The Pickering Public Library website allows users to reserve items and transfer items to their preferred branch. The library also produces live readings of children's stories on Facebook, and a podcast for children called "Wee Listen".

The Central Branch of the Pickering Public Library houses a Maker Space, where patrons can reserve technological equipment and a workstation to with and utilize for developing new technologies.

==== Digital Content ====
Pickering Public Library cardholders can access multiple online databases through the library's website. These include databases of Consumer Reports, the Toronto Star's historical newspapers, and Merck Manuals.

The library offers audiobook, e-book, and eMagazine services, including cloudLibrary, Flipster, hoopla, Libby by OverDrive, and Tumblebooks, available from the library's website.

== Future ==
There is a proposed Library Expansion for the Central Branch, due to increased usage and need. The expansion, dubbed the "City Centre Library", is projected to cost $21 million, while offering additional services such as financial learning assistance. The expansion would result in the Central Branch Library being attached to the Pickering Town Centre. Further, more items are planned to be available for loans, such as additional GoPro cameras and musical instruments.

== Awards and nominations ==
Year	Nominee / work	Award	Result
2014	Pickering Public Library	TD Summer Reading Club Library Awards	Second Place
2015	Pickering Public Library	TD Summer Reading Club Library Awards	First Place
2015	Pickering Public Library	Minister's Award for Innovation (Short List)	First Place
2016	Pickering Public Library	TD Summer Reading Club Library Awards	First Place
2017	Pickering Public Library	Psychological Safety Award	Second Place

== See also ==
- Ontario Public Libraries
