= Stormont, Dundas & Glengarry County Library =

Coordinates: 45.09031°N 75.35133°W

The Stormont, Dundas and Glengarry County Library, Ontario, Canada, was established in 1971, the SD&G County Library grew from the merger of seven existing libraries located in a number of small rural communities of Eastern Ontario, Canada: Lancaster, Ingleside, Newington (ceased 1998), Morrisburg, Chesterville, Winchester and South Mountain. Added in the same year were branches in Maxville and Alexandria, followed by Long Sault (1972); Crysler (1973); Moose Creek (ceased 2004), Avonmore, St. Andrews (ceased 2016), Williamstown (1975); Brinston (1976–1998); Finch (1978) and Dalkeith (1978-2016); Williamsburg (1979); Morewood (1986-2016); Glen Robertson (1988–1998); Lancaster Township (1992–2001); and Iroquois (1998).

Today the SDG Library consists of 15 branches covering 2,500 square kilometres (970 sq mi), and serves a population of 64,000. In addition to conventional book lending services the library offers free high speed internet access; digital downloading; free wireless access, a variety of topical databases; programmes; CNIB (Canadian National Institute for the Blind) collections and other accessible services. Operations of the SDG Library are centralized and run out of the Library's Administration Office located in Cornwall, Ontario.

The library's collections consist of audiobooks, print material, and digital resources. There are a total of 118,593 items in the collection. The system is staffed by two professional librarians, six library technicians and 48 public service staff.
