= Brampton Library =

Municipal public library system in Ontario, Canada

- 43°43′07″N 79°43′12″W
- Location: Brampton
- Type: Public library
- Established: 1858
- Branches: 8 branches

Collection
- Size: 562,000

Other information
- Director: Todd Kyle
- Employees: 160
- Website: www.bramptonlibrary.ca

The Brampton Library is a system of public libraries in Brampton, Ontario, Canada.

During the 2003 Ontario Public Library Week (October 20 to 26), the library was rebranded with a new logo, and changed its name from the Brampton Public Library to Brampton Library.

The library has eight branches, with a collection of more than 562,000 books, magazines, large-print materials, audiobooks, and DVDs. It has a staff of 160 full-time and part-time employees.

Todd Kyle is the chief executive officer of the Brampton Library.

== History ==
In 1858, a library was founded and run by the Mechanic's Institute. Its 360 volumes, plus a federal grant of $160, were the starting blocks for the first actual public library in Brampton, founded in 1887 in the Golding Building on Queen Street. As printing presses were still relatively expensive to operate, and thus book prices high, the facility had written contracts with patrons to check out books. Only the librarian and library board members were allowed to take books off the shelves.

In 1902, the library was one of several public libraries to receive a grant from American industrialist Andrew Carnegie to build a new library. After a meeting with the Brampton Board of Trade's R.J. Copeland, and a promise from the city to increase its funding from $1000 to $1250 a year, Carnegie provided another $12,500 for the facility.

In 1946, the Brampton Library began letting residents under the age of 16 sign out books from the collection.

During the 1960s and 1970s, the system expanded to fit the needs of a growing population. The expansion included the Northwood Park Branch, South Branch, and Heart Lake Branch. The Heart Lake later became Cyril Clark Branch.

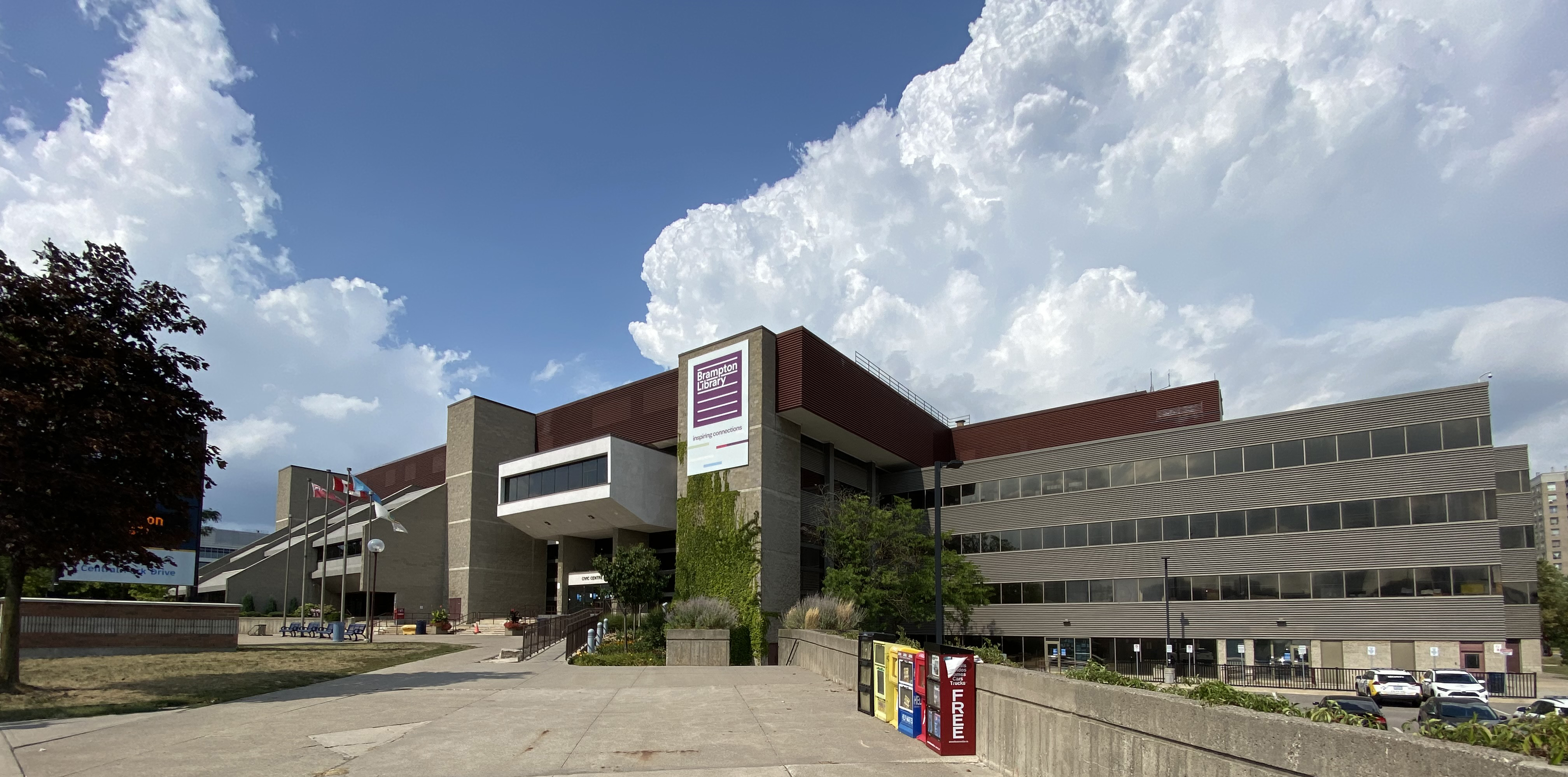
The Civic Centre building, which formerly housed the Chinguacousy Branch, in 2021

In 1972, Bramalea Consolidated Developments constructed the Civic Centre for Chinguacousy Township in the centre of the developing "new town" of Bramalea within it. This facility included a large space for a central library branch. When Brampton and Chinguacousy merged in 1974, their library systems became one. Bramalea's Chinguacousy Branch joined Brampton's Central Branch (which had replaced the Carnegie library in 1958 and was later renamed to Four Corners Branch) and others. As the reference branch, Chinguacousy was host to an extensive collection of microfilm, local history materials, and genealogy resources. In 2008, the majority of these materials were moved to the Four Corners location in the newly renovated Local History section on the second floor.

Books-by-mail services ended in 1975.

A neighbourhood branch was eventually opened in a retail plaza at Ray Lawson Boulevard and Hurontario Street; it was renamed the County Court Branch when it was moved to an office building nearby, and later renamed again to Fletcher's Creek Branch. When the South Fletcher's Sportsplex was built, Fletcher's Creek moved from private to public property, and was renamed South Fletcher's Branch.

In 2011, the Brampton Library system opened the Mount Pleasant Branch in the northwest area of the city. This replaced the Northwest Interim Branch.

The Gore Meadows Branch was built in the northeast of the city at Castlemore and The Gore Roads and opened in 2013. This location is part of a city recreation centre.

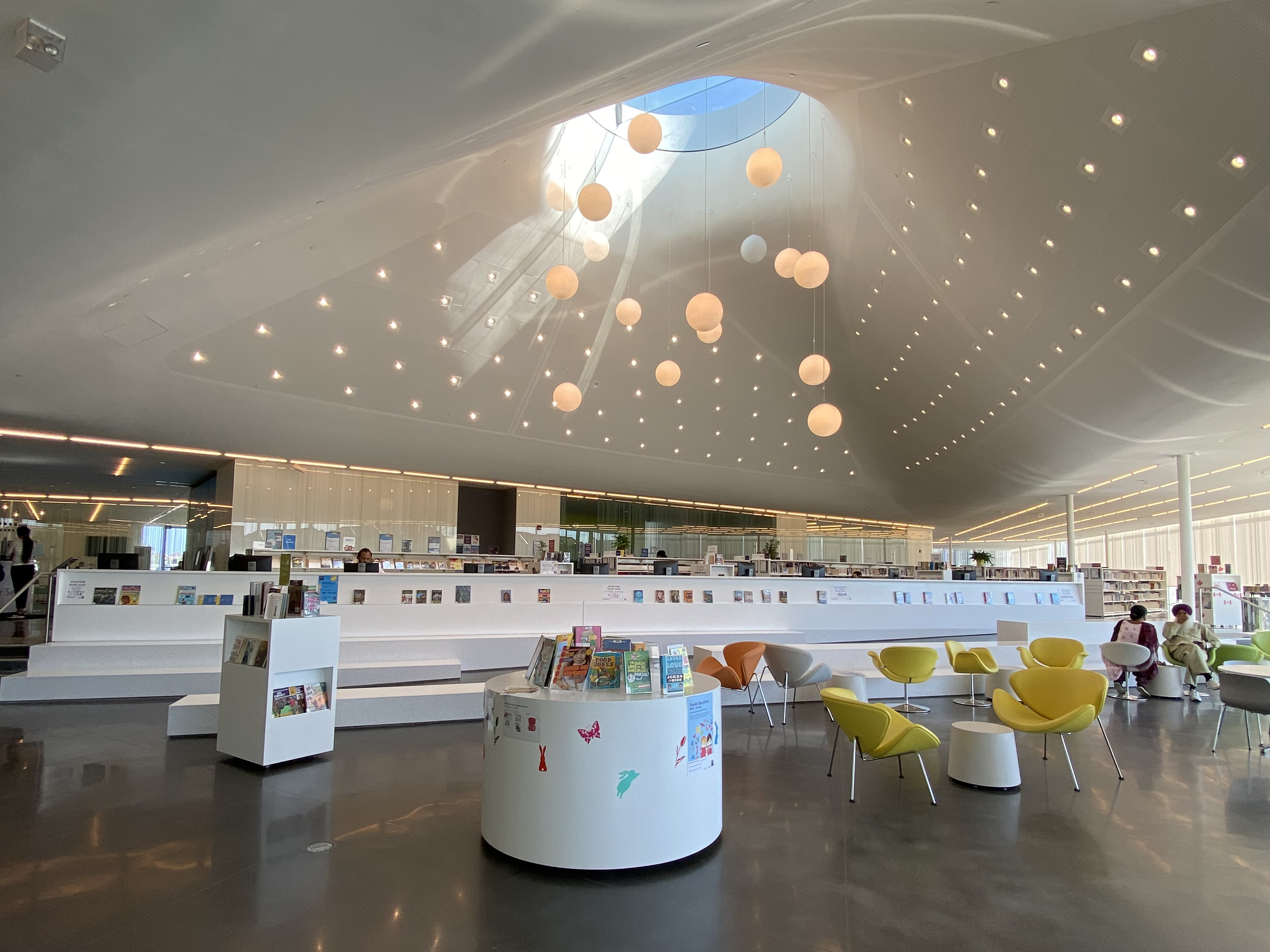
Brampton Library Springdale Branch

In addition to the six regular branches, Brampton Library also operated an interim site in the northeast region of the city. This housed a very small collection, mostly DVDs and paperbacks, as well as allowing patrons to pick up and return items. This interim site closed in the fall of 2016 because the nearby full-service branch was expected to begin operating in the summer of 2016. The new full-service location opened in 2017.

In 2018, the library stopped charging late fees for children's materials; in December 2021 the library board voted to eliminate fines for any material returned late and canceled all outstanding fines on 31 January 2022. It still assesses fines for materials not returned, for those returned in damaged condition, or for holds that are not picked up.

In 2023, despite criticism from residents, Brampton City Council voted to close the Chinguacousy Branch located in the Civic Centre building in order to convert the building into a medical school and relocate it to the Chinguacousy Park Ski Chalet, a much smaller space, and the branch was shuttered on August 1, 2023 after 50 years in operation. It reopened in the Chinguacousy Park Ski Chalet on August 22 of that year, on an interim basis until a new permanently location could be found. At a special council meeting on January 16th, 2025 Brampton City Council unanimously voted to move the Chinguacousy Branch to the site of the former Howden Recreation Centre for a joint redevelopment that will see 30,000 square foot of library space return with a connecting Recreation Centre.

== Branches ==
Name	Location	Dates	Notes	Image
Chinguacousy	Bramalea; 9050 Bramalea Road	2023-present	Formerly at 150 Central Park Drive from 1972 or 1973 and was located inside the Bramalea Civic Centre. Brampton was the first public library system in Ontario to acquire federal and provincial case law records. The case law collection was opened in this branch in 1978, on the prompt of the Central Ontario Regional Library System. This branch was renovated in late 2016 and early 2017, and was reopened in August 2017. This branch removed to Chinguacousy Park in 2023 due to Toronto Metropolitan University's (TMU) new medical school after city council voted to gift the building. Services have been reduced at current location limited to 10,000 square feet versus the 30,000 at the Civic Centre.	
Cyril Clark	Heart Lake; 20 Loafer's Lake Lane	Opened 1985	Opened September 21, 1985, it was said to be the first public library in Canada to be fully computerized. The 12,000 sq. ft. structure cost $1.5 million, and was to house 30,000 books and audio-visual items. It is named after the Township of Chinguacousy's last reeve, Cyril Clark.	
Four Corners	Downtown; 65 Queen Street East		Until 1979, this was known alternatively as the Main Branch and Central Services Branch. It has had numerous renovations, including in 1991.	
Gore Meadows	Gore Meadows; 10150 The Gore Road	Opened 2013		
Mount Pleasant Village	Mount Pleasant; 100 Commuter Dr.	Opened 25 Nov 2011	This replaced the North-West Interim Site after several years of operation. It is a multi-use facility attached to Mount Pleasant Village School and Community Centre.	
Springdale	Springdale; 10705 Bramalea Road	Opened 2018	In 1991, it was announced for a 2006 opening.	
South Fletcher's	Fletcher's Creek South; 500 Ray Lawson Blvd	Opened 1997		
South West Branch	Huttonville; 8405 Financial Dr.	Opened 2020		

=== Previous branches ===
Name	Location	Dates	Notes	Image
Bramalea	Bramalea; 106 East Drive	Closed around 1972 or 1973	This branch was replaced by the Chinguacousy branch. It was located on East Drive, just east of Bramalea.	
Carnegie	Downtown; 55 Queen Street East	1907-1974	It was funded by Andrew Carnegie; see Carnegie library. It was replaced by the Four Corners branch, in the building immediately to the east. The building is now home to the Brampton Concert Band and the Jazz Mechanics. At the 1938 annual general meeting, it was announced that Wm. Perkins Bull's "pioneer and Indian relics" would be housed at the library on display. When former Brampton High School principal William James Fenton died in 1952, it was decided that the proposed addition to the structure would be named in his honour.	Carnegie Building serving as the Brampton Public Library, 1909. Postcard from the Richard L. Frost collection.
County Court	Fletcher's Creek South; 201 County Court Boulevard	1988-1991	This branch was replaced by the Fletcher's Creek branch. It was located in a commercial office building.	
Fletcher's Creek	Fletcher's Creek South; 7700 Hurontario Street South	1991-1997	This branch replaced the County Court branch. It was housed in the City South Plaza in two floors of what is now professional office space. The second floor was renovated in 1991. The branch was replaced by the South Fletcher's branch.	
Northeast Interim Site	Springdale; 55 Mountainash Road, Unit 24	Closed Oct 1, 2016	Located at the Springdale Square shopping centre. It was closed based on expected availability of a new near-by branch, which was not yet ready when the branch was closed.	
Northwest Interim	Mount Pleasant; 10500 Creditview Road	Closed 2011	This branch was opened to serve the rapid population growth in the area. This branch was replaced by the Mount Pleasant branch.	
Northwood Park	Flowertown and Northwood Park; 10 Flowertown Avenue	Closed 28 June 1975	With usage dropping in 1974, with people heading to the larger branch, the library distributed 3000 flyers to area households in February 1975. The branch was closed due to budget cutbacks and staff relocated, at the same time as the South branch.	
South	Eldomar Heights/Peel Village; 160 Main Street South	November 1966-28 June 1975	Located at the Brampton Mall, the South branch was opened by Mayor Russell Prouse in an 18 November 1966 ceremony, with circulation starting the next day, a Saturday. It offered both adult and children's books. The branch was closed due to budget cutbacks and staff relocated, at the same time as the Northwood Park branch. The library system considered South branch too small, and asked council for new facilities west of Main Street South; the plan was turned down by council. A branch would be needed in the area within five years.	

== Services ==
- Information and reference services
- Access to full text databases
- Community information
- Internet access
- Readers' advisory services
- Programs for children, youth and adults

=== List of teen services ===
- Youth Leadership Program
- Teen Library Council
- Animation-Manga Club
- Toastmasters Program

== See also ==
- Ontario Public Libraries
- Ask Ontario
