= Newmarket Public Library (Ontario) =

- 44.0533°N 79.4590°W
- Location: 438 Park Avenue; Newmarket, Ontario, Canada
- Type: Public library

Access and use
- Access requirements: resident of Ontario
- Members: 22,234

Other information
- Director: Tracy Munusami
- Website: www.newmarketpl.ca

The Newmarket Public Library is a public library in the town of Newmarket, Ontario, Canada.

The library has a board of directors consisting of at least five members, with at most a minority of which are members of Newmarket Town Council. The library chief executive officer is Todd Kyle, who was hired for the position on 3 May 2010 and held the position until he left the library in January 2021. He will be succeeded by Tracy Munusami on 3 August 2021.

== History ==
In December 1856, the Mechanics Institute of Newmarket was established. A hall was built on Lot Street in 1865, adjacent to the grammar school. The Mechanics Institute received a grant from the Department of Agriculture until 1880, but most of its operating expenses were funded by membership fees, rental fees, concerts, lectures, and exhibitions. Larger grants became available when responsibility for the Mechanics Institute was transferred to the provincial Department of Education, but in 1895 a provincial Act required municipalities to dissolve the Mechanics Institutes and establish public library systems.

By 1901, the library rented space at the corner of Main Street and Park Avenue. On 4 January 1904, a town plebiscite was conducted to determine whether residents supported a publicly financed library and reading room. The vote was 90–26 in favour of using tax revenues to fund the library, with support in each of the three wards (36–5 in St. George's Ward, 36–10 in St. Andrew's Ward, and 18–11 in St. Patrick's Ward).

The library moved to the northwest corner of Main Street and Water Street in 1912, and to the northwest corner of Main Street and Botsfor Street in 1922.

The current library was built in 1956 from funds from the estate of Edgar Bogart, and opened on 9 June 1956. A 32-by-34-foot (9.8 by 10.4 m) portable building was installed in 1974 to the south side of the library. It remained until September 1978, when the library undertook an expansion from 5,500 square feet (510 m^{2}) to 18,000 square feet (1,700 m^{2}) completed in January 1979. The library was later expanded to 35,000 square feet (3,300 m^{2}).

== Collections ==
In 2009, the library established a video games collection. It also digitized the Bowman art collection, comprising paintings, sculptures and other artworks, and made it accessible on its website in 2010. The website also provides access to lithograph prints of the Frederick Hagan Collection and various community collections.

In 2020, the library established The Lendery, which provides board games, appliances, tools, sports equipment and other material for loan. Some of its inventory was obtained via a donation drive in 2019. It is a partnership between the library, York Region, and the nonprofit NewMakeIt.

The library operates a seed library with the York Region Food Network.

== Services ==
The library grants a free membership card to all residents in the province of Ontario.

The library offers room rentals, access to numerous databases, genealogy and town history research tools, It operates The Era, a digitization program to digitally preserve the town's newspaper.

Programs for children, youth, and adults are offered seasonally. The library participates in the student-operated volunteer Chess in the Library program.

It also allows patrons to return loaned material at a dropbox at Upper Canada Mall, which is accessible when the mall is open. A dropbox also exists at Ray Twinney Recreation Complex and the Magna Centre. The library also offers a "Library on the Go" book vending machine kiosk at Ray Twinney Complex and Magna Centre.

The library is open Mondays from 11 a.m. to 7 p.m., Tuesdays to Thursdays from 9 a.m. to 9 p.m., Fridays and Saturdays from 9 a.m. to 5 p.m., and Sundays from 1 p.m. to 5 p.m. The library closes for all Canadian public holidays, including Good Friday, Easter, Canada Day, Thanksgiving, Christmas, Boxing Day, and New Year's Day. These days you can visit the Newmarket Public online Library(NPL library). In the online library, you can access all books, movies, newspapers, and other learning resources for different age groups.

== See also ==
- List of public libraries in Ontario
