= Richmond Hill Public Library =

Library in Ontario, Canada

Coordinates: 43°52′13″N 79°26′20″W

Richmond Hill Public Library (RHPL)
- Location: Richmond Hill, Ontario, Canada
- Established: 1852 as a Mechanics Institute
- Branches: 4

Collection
- Items collected: business directories, phone books, maps, government publications, books, periodicals, genealogy, local history

Access and use
- Circulation: 2,581,761 (2012)

Other information
- Budget: $9,873,839 (2012)
- Director: Vacant
- Website: http://www.rhpl.ca

Richmond Hill Public Library is the organization that runs public libraries in the town of Richmond Hill, Ontario, Canada.

== History ==
The Richmond Hill Library Association formed in 1852 under the provisions of the previous year's provincial An Act respecting Library Associations and Mechanics Institutes. The Library Association merged with the local Mechanics Institute in 1858. In 1870, the two organizations split over a disagreement about the user fees, which the Library Association did not support but the Mechanics Institute did.

By the end of the 19th century, it was transformed to an organization that did not require membership fees. The New Richmond Hill District Public Library, with a collection of 5,000 books, was established in the new Masonic Hall on Yonge Street.

== Branches ==
Branch	Location	Size
Richmond Hill Central	1 Atkinson Street, Richmond Hill	60,000 sq ft (5,600 m^{2})
Oak Ridges	34 Regatta Avenue, Richmond Hill	19,000 sq ft (1,800 m^{2})
Richmond Green	1 William F Bell Parkway, Richmond Hill	12,000 sq ft (1,100 m^{2})
Richvale	40 Pearson Avenue, Richmond Hill	8,000 sq ft (740 m^{2})

=== Central Library ===
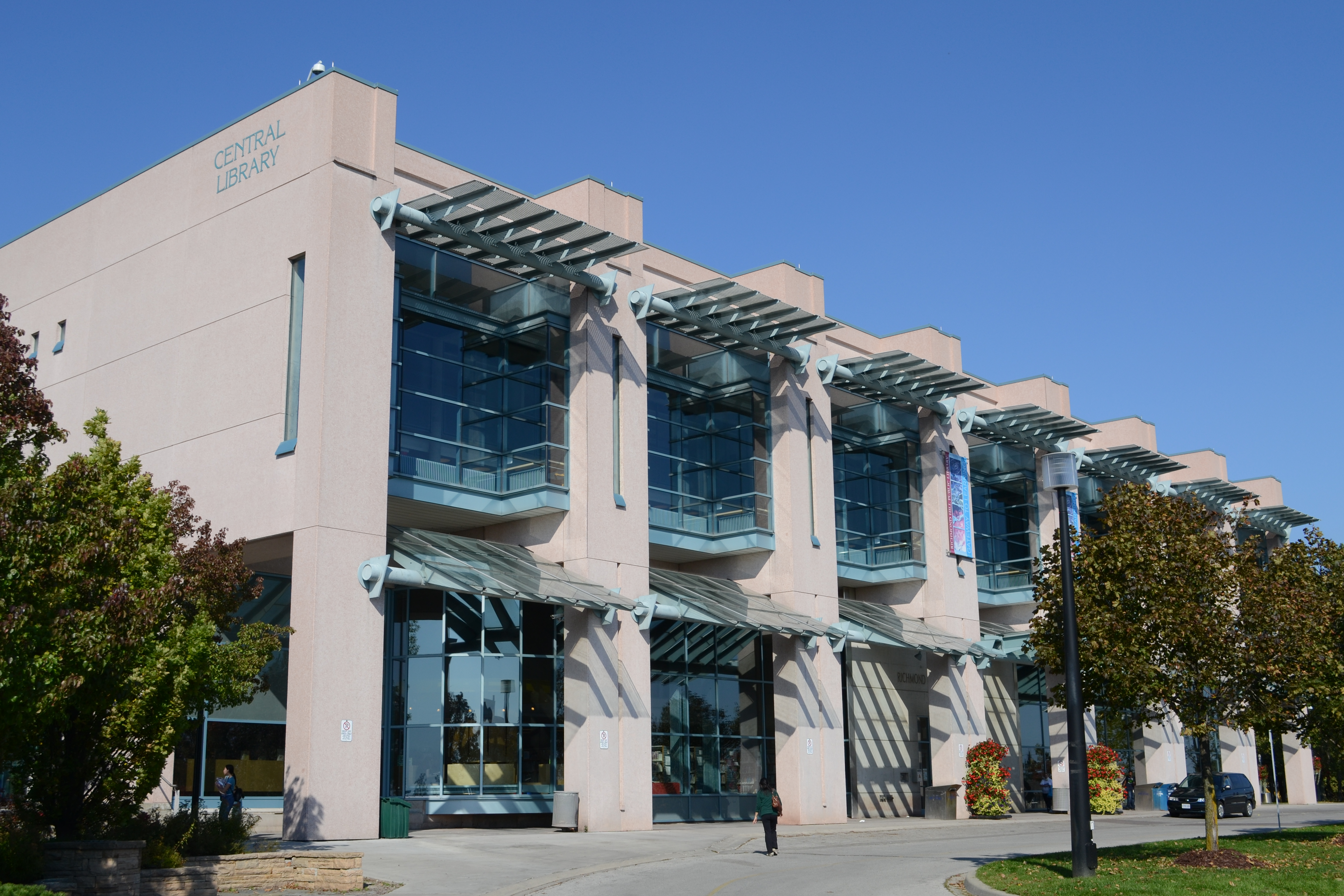
Richmond Hill Central Library

The Central Library opened in 1993. It was designed by A.J. Diamond, Donald Schmitt and Company, and won an Award of Merit in the 1994 Governor General's Medals for Architecture. The building consists of four storeys: on the first is the circulation desk, children's department, and music and video materials; on the second are meeting rooms; on the third are reference materials, magazines, newspapers, and general stacks; and on the fourth library administration and local history archives.

=== Oak Ridges Library ===
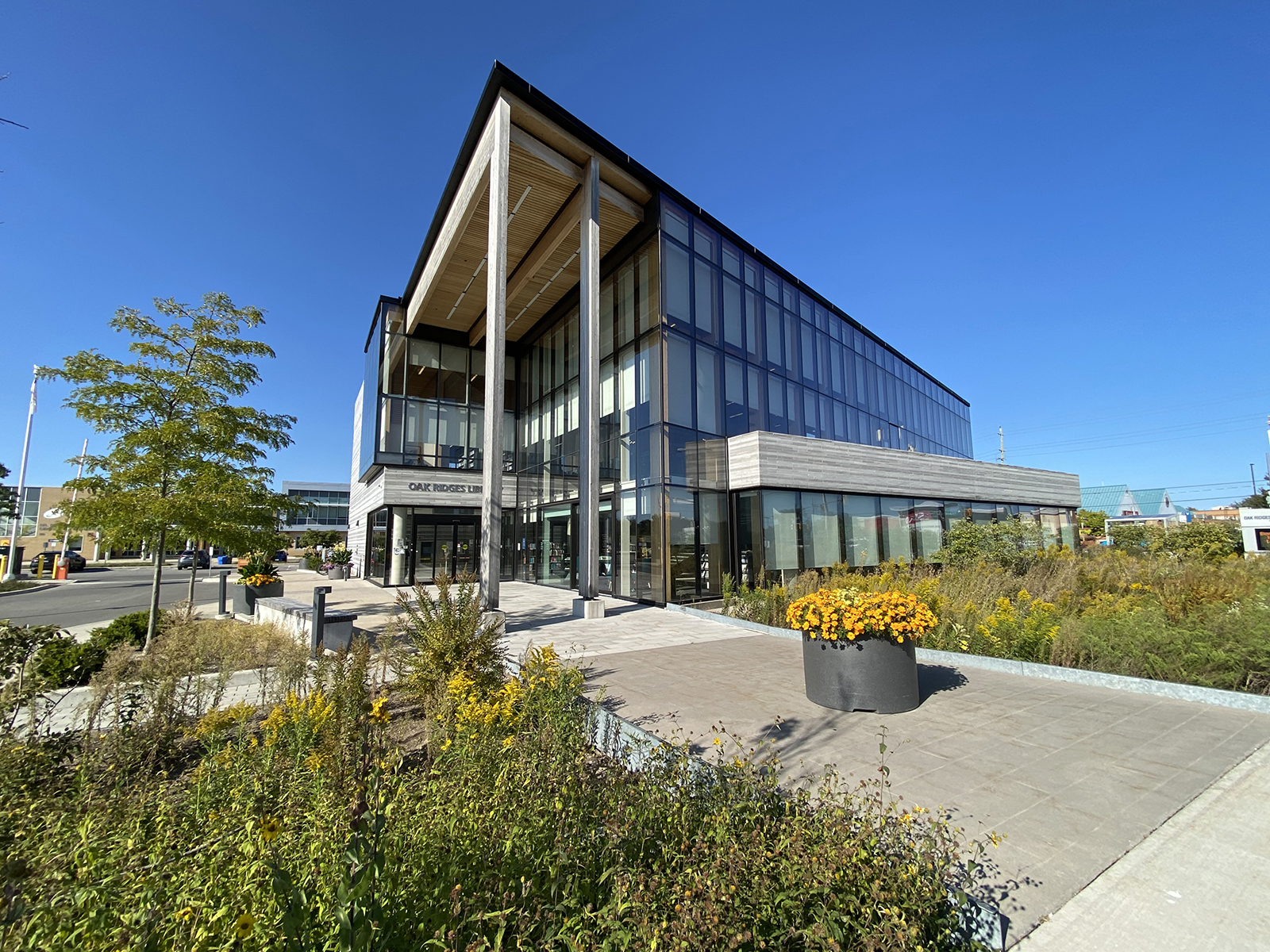
Oak Ridges Library Exterior

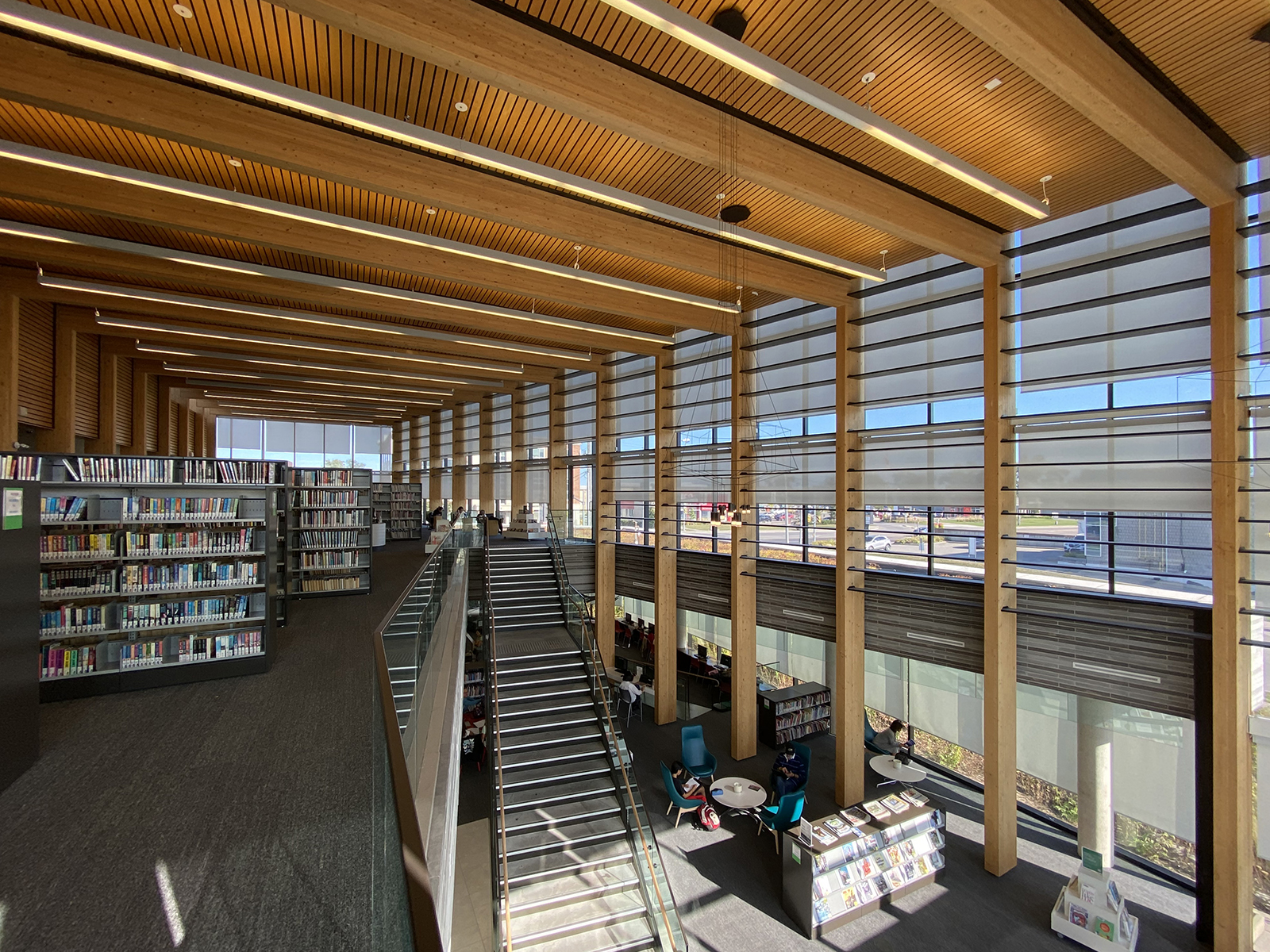
Oak Ridges Library Interior

In June 1971, a librarian at Richmond Hill Public Library drove to the community of Oak Ridges with a carload of books, which she signed out to residents of the area. She also "conducted story time sessions" at two schools near Lake Wilcox. By December 1971, the Richmond Hill Public Library had leased a portable classroom at Lake Wilcox Public School, establishing the Wildwood Branch of the library. A local man donated land for the construction of a fire station and the community's first permanent library, and on 22 June 1975, the Charles Connor Memorial Branch was opened and named in his honour.

The Oak Ridges Moraine Library, opened in 1990 in a strip mall, was a 6,000-square-foot (560 m^{2}) facility designed by Phillip Carter. It replaced the Charles Connor Memorial Library located on King Road, and was replaced by a 19,000-square-foot (1,800 m^{2}) building on the northwest corner of Yonge Street and Regatta Avenue. The 19,000-square-foot (1,800 m^{2}) building was designed by Perkins + Will Canada Inc.

Construction of the library began in 2016, and was expected to be completed by November 2017. Rain and contractual issues delayed the opening until March 2018. In October 2018, with the library about 90% complete, the town of Richmond Hill terminated the contract of Bondfield Construction Company Limited, stating that the contractor had made little progress in completing the final 10% of the project. It then exercised a performance bond with Zurich Insurance to arrange for the completion of construction, which hired construction company Buttcon Limited to complete the work by late 2019. The library opened on 12 November 2019, and held its grand opening on 29 February 2020.

The capital costs for construction of the new library were $11,863,000. The library is a two-storey structure that includes meeting rooms, children's programming room, a computer room, a maker space, audio-video equipment, and a "memory lab" to convert photographs to digital formats. In 2021, it received LEED Silver certification from the Canada Green Building Council.

=== Richmond Green Library ===
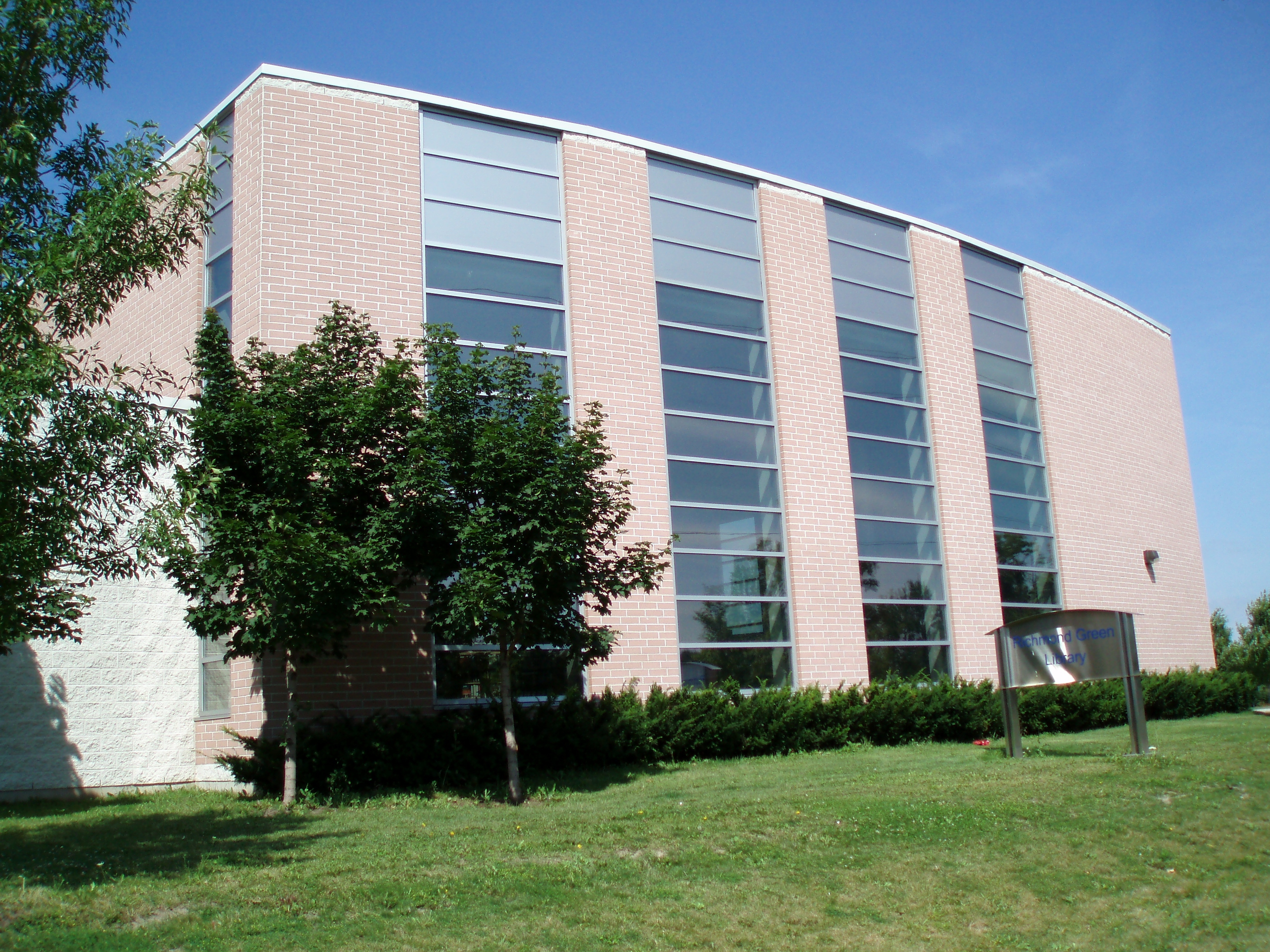
Richmond Green Library

The Richmond Green Library is located in Richmond Green Park, adjacent to the Richmond Green Secondary School, for which it is also the school library.

=== Richvale Library ===
The Richvale Library was also designed by Philip Carter and opened in 1983 in the Richvale neighbourhood of Richmond Hill north of Highway 7 and west of Yonge Street.

== Membership ==
Library cards are issued for free to individuals who live, work, study or pay property taxes in the city of Richmond Hill or any municipality in the Regional Municipality of York (Aurora, East Gwillimbury, Georgina, King, Markham, Newmarket, Vaughan, and Whitchurch-Stouffville). Non-residents may obtain a card for a fee. Lost or stolen cards are replaced for $2, and damaged or worn out cards are replaced for free. Memberships must be renewed annually, requiring confirmation of the patron's residence and payment of outstanding fees. Late fees were suspended in March 2020 during the COVID-19 pandemic, and were eliminated in January 2022, at which time 8,500 outstanding fines were also cancelled.

== Services ==
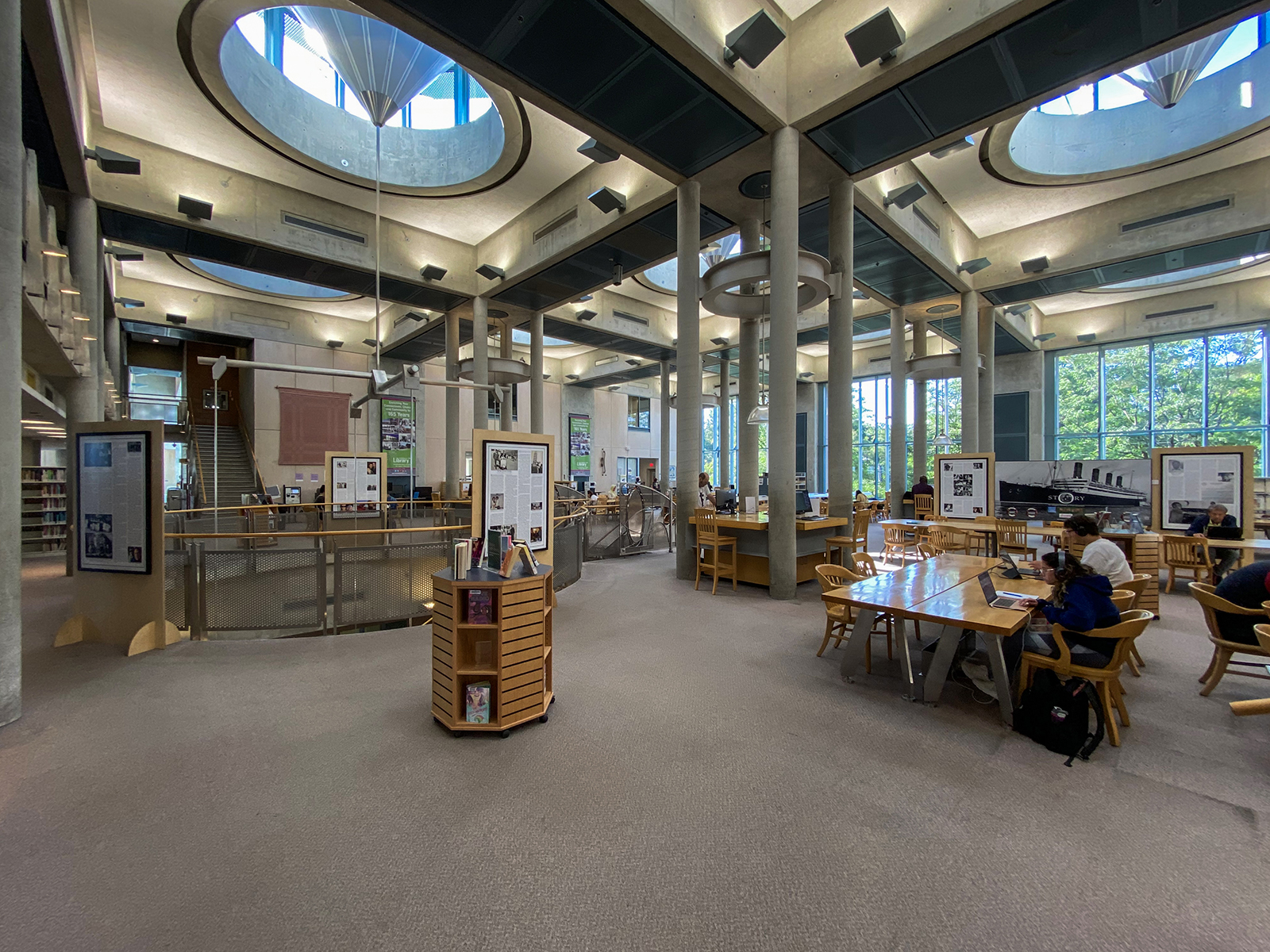
Richmond Hill Central Library interior

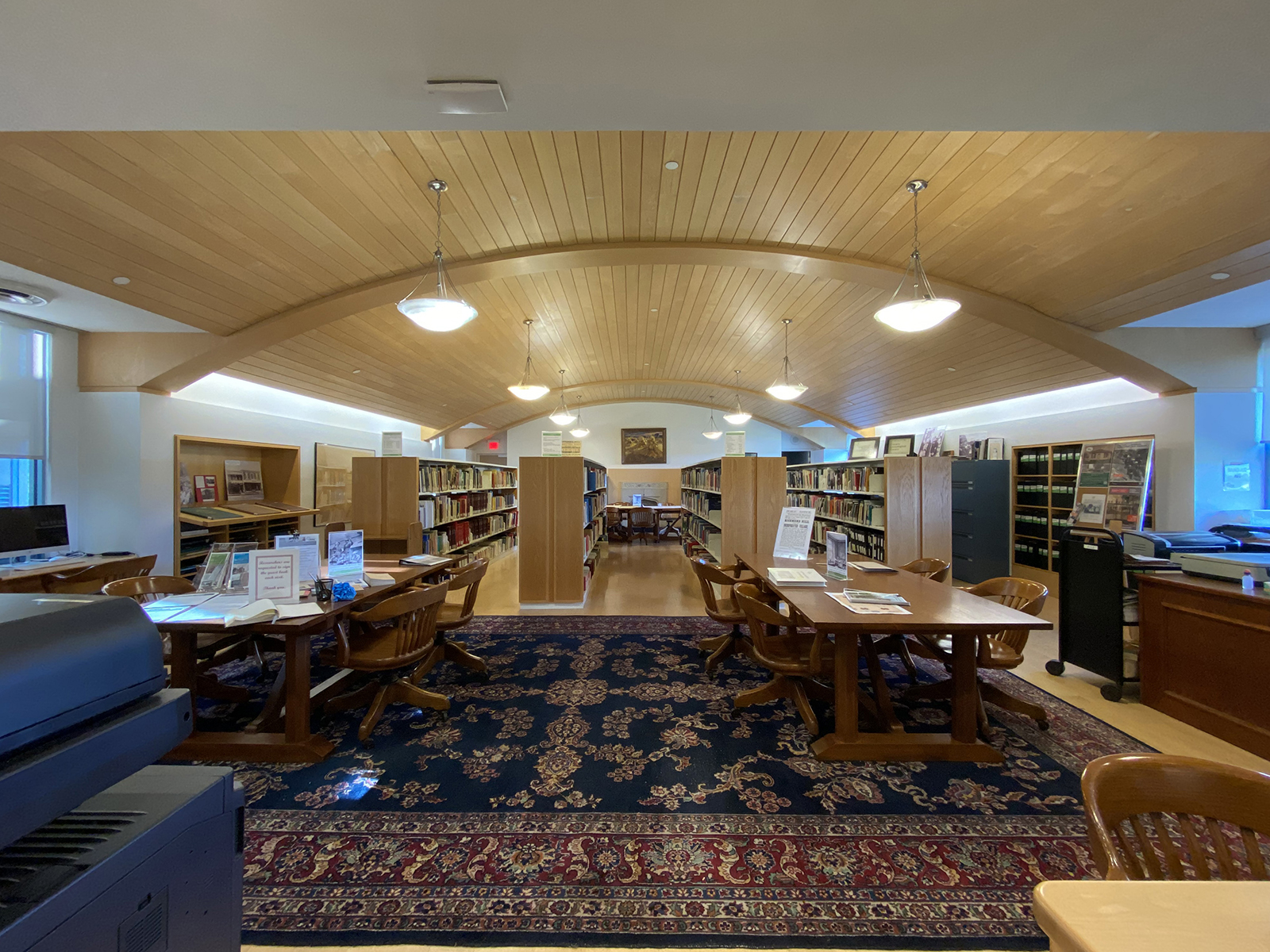
Local History Room in Richmond Hill Central Library

- Wi-Fi Access
- Computer Access (Linux terminals with web browser, OpenOffice and other applications)
- Ask a Librarian (online reference)
- Bestseller Book Express
- Business Resources
- Community Information
- Job/Career Resources
- Visiting Library Service (for Shut-in clientèles)
- Local History/Genealogy
- Children's & Adult Programs
- Meeting Room Rentals
- Exhibits
- e-book resources
- York Region Transit and Viva ticket agent

== See also ==
- Ask Ontario
- Ontario Public Libraries
