= Markham Public Library =

Markham Public Library (MPL)
- Vision: Markham Public Library - the Place where Markham's communities come together to imagine, create, learn and grow.
- 43°52′24″N 79°15′31″W
- Location: Markham, Ontario, Canada
- Branches: 8

Collection
- Items collected: business directories, government publications, non-fiction and fiction books, periodicals, genealogy, local history, DVDs, Blu-rays, CDs, toys, seeds
- Size: Approximately 500,000

Access and use
- Circulation: 4,461,543 (2012)
- Population served: 261,573

Other information
- Budget: $12,307,408 (2012)
- Director: Catherine Biss, CEO
- Employees: over 240
- Website: www.markhampubliclibrary.ca

Markham Public Library (MPL) is a library system operated by the municipal government of the City of Markham in Canada. There are eight branches in the city, serving about 250,000 residents in Markham. The libraries are managed by the Administration Centre, located at 6031 Highway 7.

In 2008, the system was renamed to the singular Markham Public Library to reflect its status as one unified system. Its current Chief Executive Officer (CEO) is Catherine Biss.

== History ==
While the current library system dates back to the 1970s, there was the subscription based system popular in 19th Century Ontario, the Mechanics’ Institute, operated out of the Old Town Hall on Main Street.

== Branches ==
The Markham Public Library has 8 branches. The Markham Public Library branches are:

- Aaniin Library
- Angus Glen Library
- Cornell Library
- Markham Village Library
- Milliken Mills Library
- Thornhill Community Library
- Thornhill Village Library
- Unionville Library

Branch	Location	Size	Collection	Notes	Image
Aaniin Library	14th Avenue and Middlefield Road	~20,000 square feet (1,900 m^{2})		Opened in 2018 (original planned completion for August 2015 delayed until 2018).	
Angus Glen Library	3990 Major Mackenzie Drive East	29,700 square feet (2,760 m^{2})	157,434	Built 2003-2005 and has largest collection in Markham.	
Cornell Library	3201 Bur Oak Avenue	25,000 square feet (2,300 m^{2})	100,000	Opened in 2012 and has a medical library on second floor. Markham Stouffville Hospital Library open to all user including patients and staff from Markham Stouffville Hospital. Houses Health and Wellness collection.	
Markham Village Library	6041 Highway 7 East	30,000 square feet (2,800 m^{2})	120,000	Built after 1977 when Markham Fair moved from the location. Library re-opened with larger premises 2009; site of the Agricultural Hall rink (c.1916) and original home of the Markham Fairgrounds.	
Milliken Mills Library	Unit 1, 7600 Kennedy Road	16,865 square feet (1,566.8 m^{2})	80,000	Opened in 1990 along with Community Centre.	
Thornhill Community Library	7755 Bayview Avenue	26,053 square feet (2,420.4 m^{2})	80,000	Opened in 1975 along with Community Centre and renovated in 1989 and 2010.	
Thornhill Village Library	10 Colborne Street	4,283 square feet (397.9 m^{2})	30,000	Building built 1851 and library since 1959; last renovated in 1992.	
Unionville Library	15 Library Lane	13,640 square feet (1,267 m^{2})	100,000	Opened in 1984 replacing older library and now Old Unionville Library Community Centre.	

== Customer-Centred Classification ==
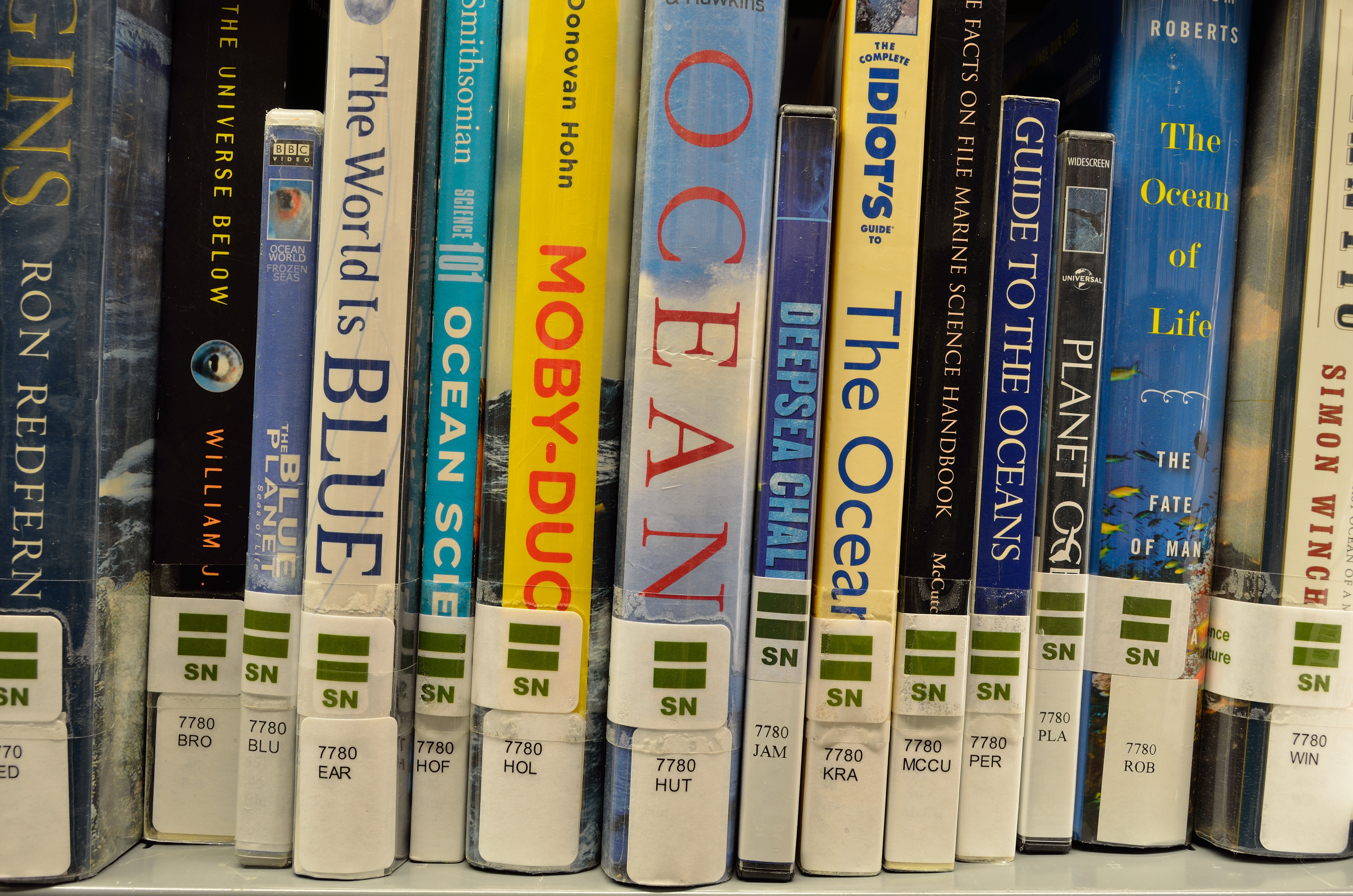
Customer-Centred Classification.

The Markham Village branch was the first to develop its own library classification system called the Customer Centred Classification (C3). Compared to the Dewey Decimal Classification (DDC) or Library of Congress Classification (LCC), C3 is more modern and is supposed to be easier for library patrons to find books at the book stacks. All branches utilize the C3 cataloguing system for their non-fiction collection. The Thornhill Village branch started the migration to C3 in 2009, and C3 is used by the Thornhill Community Centre branch when it re-opened in 2011.

== Membership ==
People who work, live, or attend a school in York Region may apply for a free membership. Otherwise, a $60.00 annual membership fee will apply.

== Services ==
Like many other libraries across Ontario, the Markham Public Library system allows members to check out books and other physical and online media. Members can:

- Place up to 75 holds per one membership account;
- Check out 100 physical items per one membership account;
- Use TeleCirc Telephone Library Service;
- Use the Interlibrary loan service;
- Access free online courses

=== Borrowing privileges ===
Item Types	Loan Period	Renewals	Late Return Fines
Books, talking books, music CD, Children's Kits, CD-ROM (Software), Watt Readers	21 days	10 auto renewals (with no holds by other members)	No late fees
Video, Cassettes, DVDs, Blu-ray Discs	7 days	3 auto renewals (with no holds by other members)	
Xbox 360 games	7 days	10 automatic renewals (with no holds by other members)	No late fees
Boomerang	7 days for DVDs, 14 days for books	No renewals allowed	No late fees
Magazines	7 days	1 automatic renewal (with no holds by other members)	No late fees
EBook	up to 21 days	No renewals, but can be borrowed again if the item is available	EBooks automatically expire at the end of period, no late fee

=== Other services ===
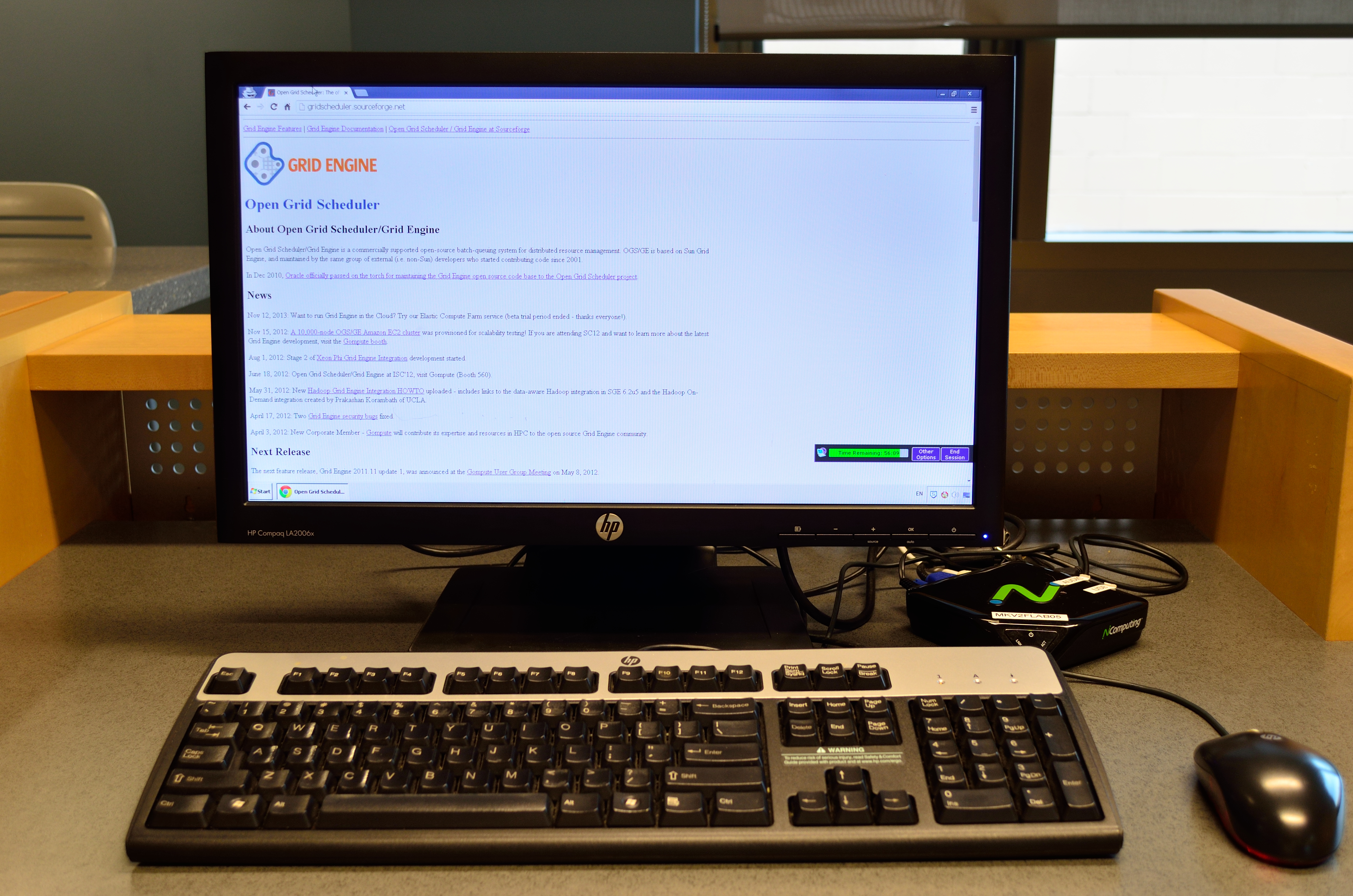
A computer terminal in the Markham Village Library

Other than borrowing books and media, the following services are available:

- Free WiFi Internet
- Library Catalogue access
- One hour internet access per day per membership account (additional time can be requested - guest logins are available for those without a library card)
- One hour of Microsoft Office or OpenOffice (depending on the branch) per day per membership account
- Regular programs for preschool, children, teen, and adults
- Time specific programs, eg. PA Days, Winter Breaks, March Breaks, and Summer Holidays
- Meeting rooms for rent
- Study rooms of various occupancy (inquire at specific branch for availability and bookings)
- Photocopying, printing, scanning
- Maker Space at Aaniin branch with 3D printers and laser cutter, virtual reality, and equipment for robotics, circuitry and coding
- Kids Makerspace at Connell branch has toys and digital tools that are geared toward STEAM
- Digital Media Lab for graphic designs, making and editing videos, music and podcasts, etc

== See also ==
- Public libraries in Ontario
- City of Markham
