= Ask Ontario =

Canadian student to library chat service

- Company type: Nonprofit
- Headquarters: Toronto, Ontario, Canada
- Website: www.ocls.ca/services/askontario

Ask Ontario (askON) is a realtime chat and SMS-based research information service that connects students of Ontario, Canada to staff at college libraries across the province, for instant-messaging and SMS-based reference help online. askON's mandate is to help visitors find better information than they can on their own, and to raise the profile of Ontario's libraries as providers of services and tools, responsive to the needs of an increasingly digitally literate society.

It was launched on January 31, 2008 as one of five projects of Knowledge Ontario, to leverage the collective resources of Ontario's publicly funded libraries in different sectors, and to foster information and digital literacy by helping Ontarians to find authoritative digital information and improve their online research skills. askON became an opt-in service of Ontario Colleges Library Service (OCLS) in June 2012.

Using licensed, secure chat software, askON staff provide research guidance and help to users navigating the Internet, their library's services, and other online resources. askON is a collaborative effort with college libraries, each of which has offered up some of their staff time to make the service possible. The various libraries' staff work in shifts to provide over 60 hours a week to post-secondary students. The service also engages library and information science students as volunteer interns who assist on the service in exchange for the training and professional development opportunity.

As of March 2021, 12 libraries are participating in the service.
