= Whitby Public Library =

Public library in Whitby, Ontario, Canada

Coordinates: 43.878152°N 78.945887°W

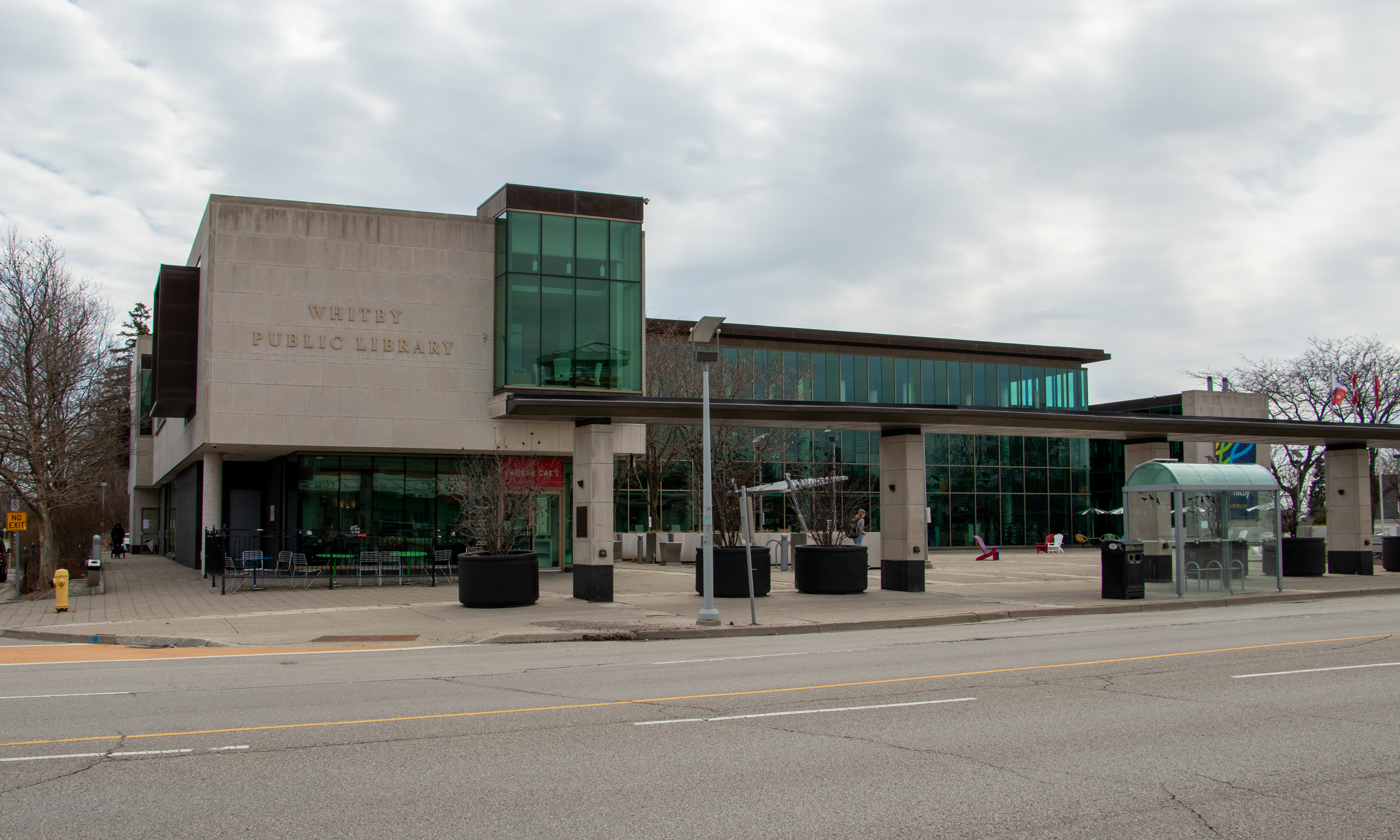
- Whitby Central Library Branch
- Type: Public Library system Whitby, Ontario, Canada
- Established: 1850
- Branches: 3

Collection
- Size: 300,000 items

Access and use
- Circulation: 1.4 million items

Other information
- Budget: $5.7 million (2016)
- Director: Rhonda Jessup
- Employees: 80
- Website: Whitby Public Library website

The Whitby Public Library is a public library that serves the town of Whitby, Ontario, Canada, with three branches. The library is governed through a ten-person library board appointed by the town, and operated by a staff of more than 80 full and part-time employees. As of 2016, there were over 1.4 million items circulated and the system had a CA$5,700,000 budget.

== History ==
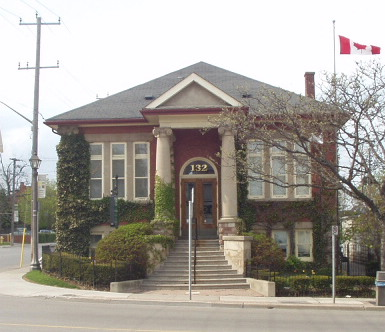
Whitby Carnegie Library. 132 Dundas St. West.

The roots of the Whitby Public Library can be traced to a circulating collection started by Whitby tailor Hugh Fraser (1815–1890) in 1850. Fraser later became librarian when a local Mechanics' Institute was formed in 1852, offering reading material to institute members. Support for a public library grew, and in 1911, Whitby town leaders appointed a library board and applied for a grant from American industrialist and philanthropist Andrew Carnegie. Construction of the Carnegie library began in early 1913 and the building was officially opened the following year. The new building housed 5,000 books and contained separate reading areas for men, women and children. Cards cost five cents and required the signature of a "responsible person" who could identify the borrower.

The Carnegie Building served the community for many years. However, by the 1970s, it was too small to serve the growing town. In 1973, the library was moved to the lower floor of the Whitby municipal building on Dundas Street. In 1978, a new Town Hall opened and the library occupied the whole of the former municipal building. The Carnegie library still stands at the corner of Dundas and Byron Streets.

The town of Whitby continued to grow, and the former municipal building became increasingly inadequate. Plans to build a new central library as part of a civic recreation centre in the late 1980s did not come to fruition, although a new neighbourhood branch was opened in a shopping plaza on Rossland Road East in 1989 as a "temporary measure" until the new branch could be built. Instead, plans were made to keep the main branch in Whitby's downtown core on the property of the existing library. The initiative was approved and funded by the Town and additional funding obtained from the provincial and federal governments through a SuperBuild grant. Architects Shore Tilbe Irwin + Partners were hired in 2002 and construction began the following year. The old library remained open as the new one was built and was demolished after its completion.

The new central library opened in 2005 and has won a number of design awards, including the Ontario Library Association's Building Award and an interior design award from the Association of Registered Interior Designers of Ontario. The 54,000-square-foot (5,000 m^{2}) building is anchored by a civic square with a reflecting pool. In addition to traditional library services, the facility also offers wireless internet access, fireplace-equipped lounges and an onsite café.

=== Merger with Whitby Township Library ===
Library services in the Township of Whitby date back to 1897, when a subscription-based "association library" was formed in Brooklin. In 1958, township leaders decided to establish a public library supported by property taxes and a new building was completed in 1961. In 1968, the Town and Township of Whitby amalgamated to form a newly expanded Town of Whitby and the Township library in Brooklin became a branch of the Whitby library system.

The Brooklin branch building served the growing community until 2009. In the summer of that year, construction began on a new 10,000-square-foot (930 m^{2}) branch as part of a new community centre on the same site. The branch occupied temporary quarters on Winchester Road during construction. The new Brooklin Community Centre & Library opened in November 2010.

== Whitby Archives ==
The Whitby Archives were established by the Whitby Historical Society in 1968 at the historic Whitby Centennial Building. Local historian Brian Winter was named Archivist. In 2005, the Archives were moved to their current location on the second floor of the new Central Library. In 2013, Sarah Ferencz took over the role of Archivist. The Archives houses a collection of several thousand items, including over 5,000 photographs, documentation on approximately 3,000 Whitby families and information on an estimated 400 buildings. There are also special collections on a number of well-known Whitby landmarks, including Camp X, Trafalgar Castle School and the Whitby Psychiatric Hospital. Over two thousand historic photos have been posted online as part of a digitization initiative supported by a private donation.

== See also ==
- Public libraries in Ontario
- List of Carnegie libraries in Canada

== Sources ==
- Winter, Brian (1999). Chronicles of a County Town: Whitby Past and Present. Self-published. ISBN 0-9685-7450-5.
