= Ashburn, Ontario =

Ashburn
- Unincorporated community
- Interactive map of Ashburn
- Coordinates: 44°0′9″N 78°59′43″W
- Country: Canada
- Province: Ontario
- Regional municipality: Durham
- Town: Whitby
- Butler's Corners: 1832
- Ashburn: 1850
- Amalgamation with Town of Whitby: 1968

Government
  - Type: Municipality
  - Mayor: Pat Perkins
  - Councillor: Tracy Hanson (North Ward-1)
- Elevation: 250 m (820 ft)
- Time zone: UTC−5 (EST)
  - Summer (DST): UTC−4 (EDT)
- Forward sortation area: L0B 1A0
- Area codes: 905 and 289
- NTS Map: 031D02
- GNBC Code: FADWX

Ashburn is a hamlet in the town of Whitby, Durham Region, Ontario, Canada, located approximately 15 kilometres north of the town core, and centred on the intersection of Ashburn Road and Myrtle Road. It is a rural settlement area on the Oak Ridges Moraine, situated on the headwaters of the Lynde Creek watershed and part of Ontario's protected Golden Horseshoe Greenbelt.

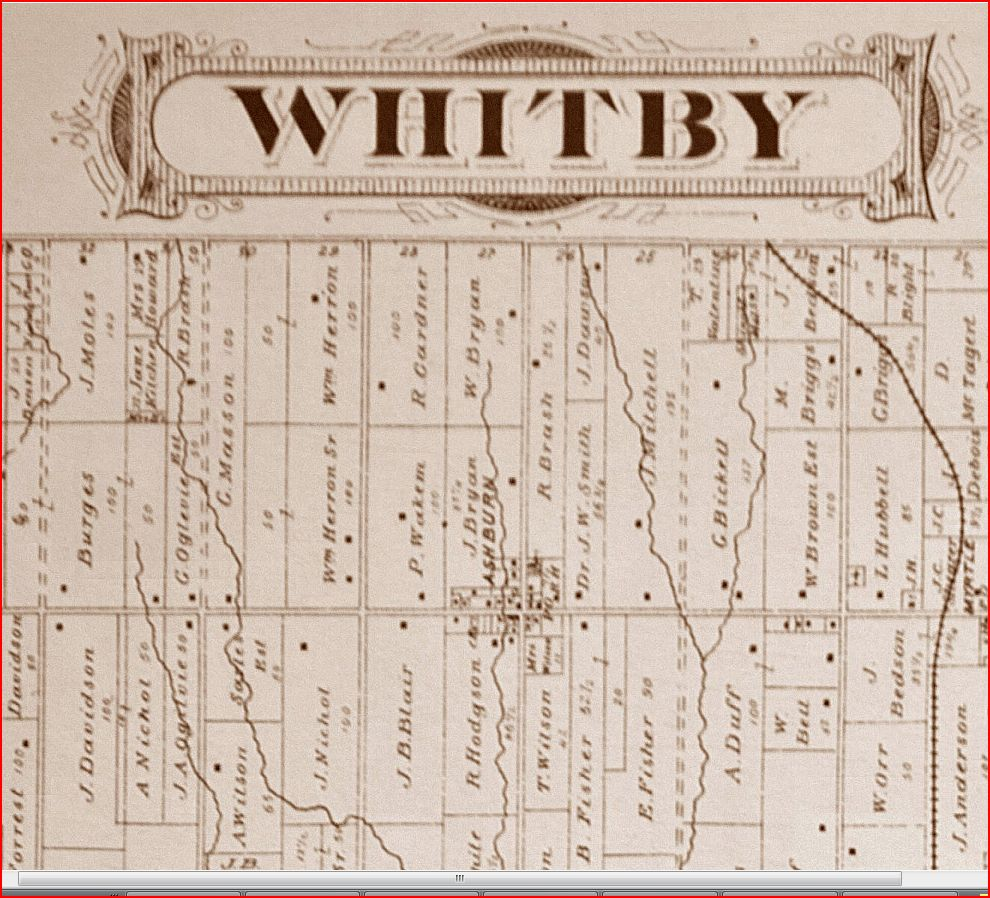
1877 Map of Whitby Township, with a focus on Ashburn and surroundings

== History ==
The community was originally named Butler's Corners after settler Richard Butler in 1832. The first European settlers were primarily Scottish immigrants. A much earlier native settlement on the Lynde Creek immediately south of the hamlet has been documented. In the late 1830s, the Windsor Road Company was created and a road was built from Windsor Harbour (Whitby) to Butler's Corners. The first store was opened in 1847. The name "Ashburn" was eventually chosen in 1850 because of the community's connection to the potash industry. "Asheries were built to produce potash from the trees that were cleared during the settlement of Whitby Township." The original spelling—Ashbourne, after Ashbourne, Derbyshire in England—was changed in error due to the cancellation stamp used by the post office (est. 1852).

In 1857, Whitby Township was divided into two municipalities: East Whitby, and Whitby. Ashburn was one of the principal villages of Township of Whitby, together with Brooklin and Myrtle. In 1869, Ashburn had a population between 100 and 250, with a stage coach to Uxbridge and Whitby, daily mail, an Orange Society (No. 176), three stores, two hotels and several blacksmiths and wagonmakers. Between 1870 and 1872, a railway was built from Port Whitby on Lake Ontario to Port Perry on Lake Scugog, crossing Myrtle Road two kilometres east of Ashburn. The Port Whitby and Port Perry Railway—which was dismantled in 1941—allowed the hamlets of Whitby Township to ship grain and timber south to the railway mainlines along Lake Ontario. In 1875, the hamlet had a population of 150. In the nineteenth century the local Agricultural Society regularly held cattle fairs in the village. By 1910, the village's population declined to 100, and had a daily stage to the railway station in Myrtle. It was serviced by the Claremont and Ashburn Telephone Company, which later became part of the York and Ontario Telephone Union.

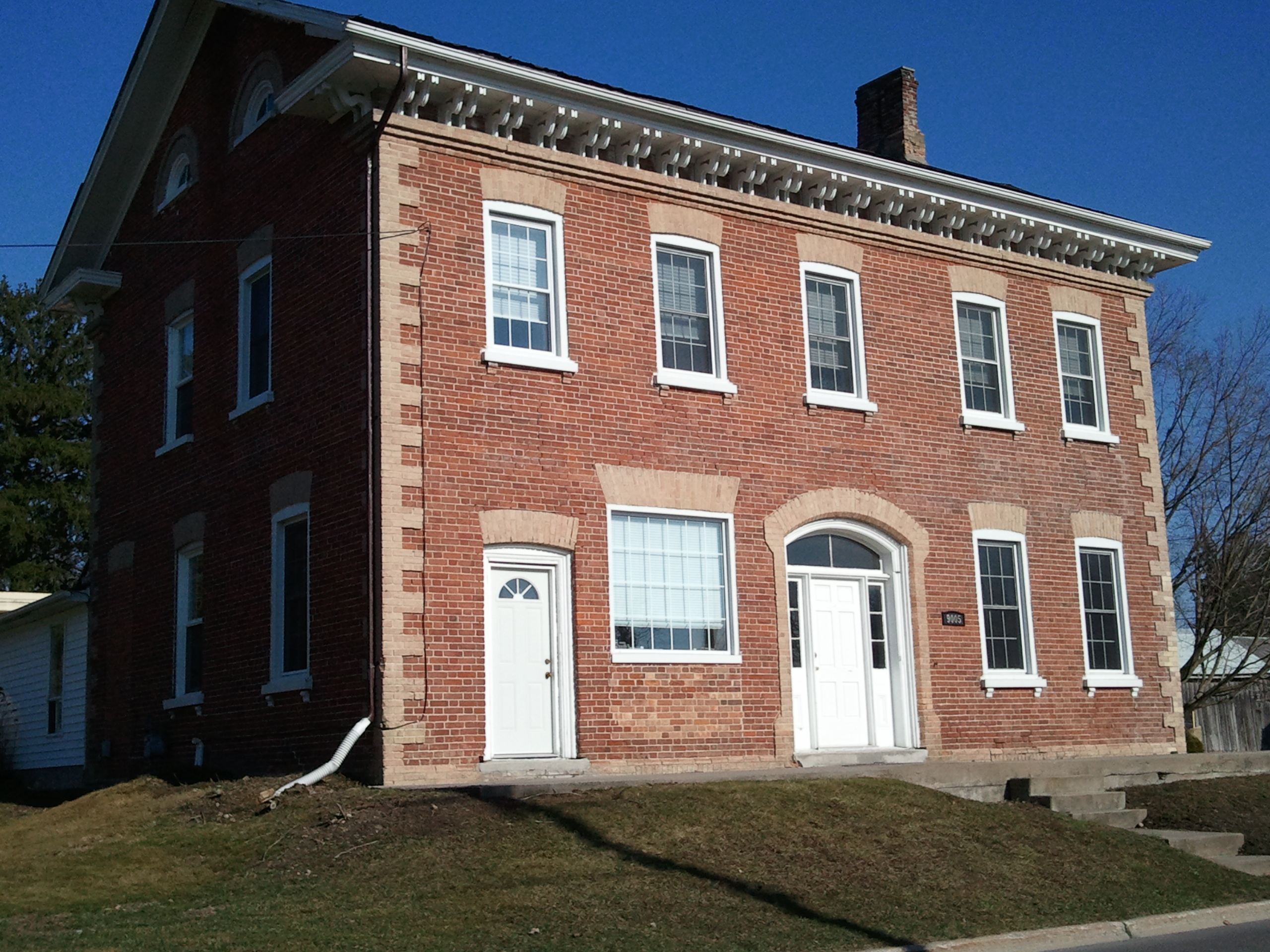
Wilson House, built 1868-69

The Burns Presbyterian Church has been central to the community since its beginnings in 1849. The first church building was constructed in 1857. It was completely destroyed by fire in 1967, and a new building was completed in 1968. In 2012 a major addition and renovation was undertaken by the congregation.

The Ashburn School House (after 1967 a community centre) was built circa 1861 by William Pearson (1833–1897), a Scottish builder who constructed many fine stone houses in Whitby and Pickering; each wall was constructed in a different style to showcase Pearson's masonry skill. The school was designated a "cultural heritage property" in 1984. In 1866, the school had about 80 pupils. Today, the designated primary schools for Ashburn are in the neighbouring community of Brooklin, and the secondary schools in urban Whitby.

On January 1, 1968, Whitby and the Township of Whitby, which included Ashburn and the three rural hamlets of Brooklin, Myrtle and Myrtle Station, amalgamated into the new Town of Whitby. The hamlet received a house numbering system in the 1980s.

In 1972 Ashburn added only its third street when the Bryson family sold 9 acres in the northeast quadrant of the village to a developer with the stipulation that the street servicing the development be named after their two children, Glen and Laura.

In 1999 the community was visited by Prince Andrew, Duke of York, and in 2000 Ashburn celebrated its 150th anniversary.

== Geography ==
Ashburn is designated as an Oak Ridges Moraine Rural Settlement Area, and development is limited by the Oak Ridges Moraine Conservation Act of 2001. Its surrounding area has a high aquifer vulnerability, and the western edge has a woodland and wetland designated as hydrologically sensitive. The Ashburn subwatershed (which extends as far north as Chalk Lake), is home to the redside dace, a provincially designated endangered species threatened in the Lynde watershed by destroyed or degraded habitat. In response to local environmental concerns, some citizens of Ashburn have formed the Ashburn Environmental Coalition.

== Demographics ==
Statistics Canada offers a 2006 Cumulative Profile for Ashburn and region (including Myrtle the western section of neighbouring Brooklin), with a total population of 6,409 and 2,198 dwellings. Because of a building surge in Brooklin, the population increased by 64% from 2001 to 2006. In 2006, there were 565 people over the age of 65. 560 individuals had a mother-tongue other than English or French, with Tamil the most frequently spoken language in homes after English and French. 880 people came to Canada as immigrants, 385 of whom were fourteen years or younger in 2006. 540 are visible minorities (210 Black; 105 South Asian). There were 90 with Aboriginal identity. Outside of the medical professions, no one had an earned doctorate. The median income in 2005 for the population 15 years and older was $39,705, with a median family income of $98,250 (comparison: Whitby as a whole, $84,219; Ontario: $60,455). The average value of non-farm, non-reserve private dwellings was $371,655 (comparison: Whitby as a whole, $314,350).

Contextual information for Ashburn's designated primary schools (in the neighbouring hamlet of Brooklin) indicates a lower percentage of children born outside of Canada than the regional and provincial averages, and far fewer bilingual children.

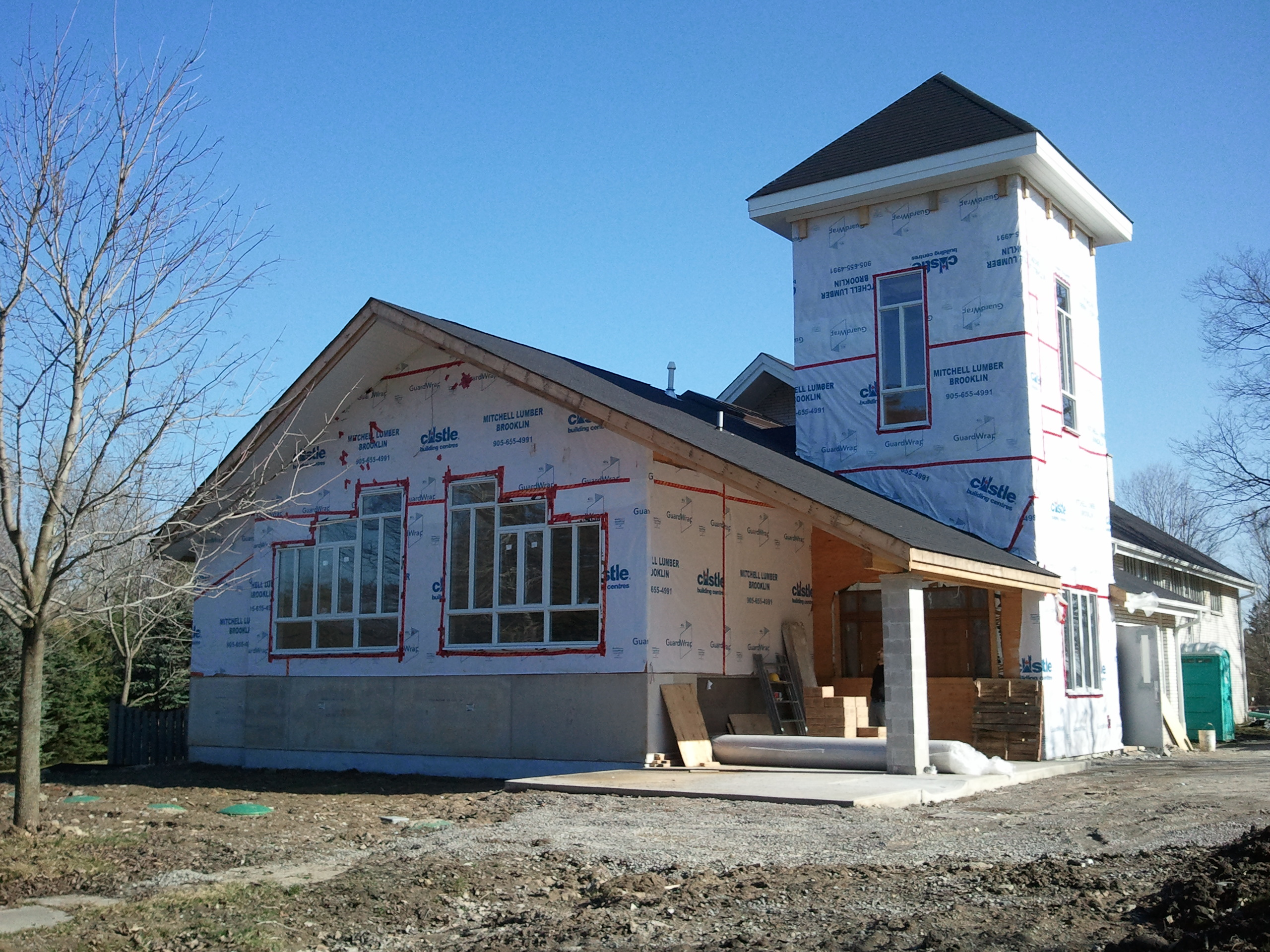
Burns Presbyterian Church

== Economy ==
Ashburn is a traditionally agricultural community. Today it is home to Greenwood Mushroom Farm, one of the three largest mushroom farms in Canada. The operation moved its headquarters and main production site from Pickering to Ashburn in 1993. In 2004, the operation employed 220 individuals. In 2011, the Ashburn company received a grant of $3.1 million under Ontario's Rural Economic Development Program (RED), to expand their facilities on the Oak Ridges Moraine, and to support the creation of 80 new jobs. In July 2004, 150 residents of Ashburn filed a $10 million civil lawsuit against Greenwood Mushroom Farm, claiming that the stench from the farm created a nuisance, and that its noxious odours violated the Environmental Protection Act.

The hamlet is home to a number of sporting facilities: the Royal Ashburn Golf Club (est. 1962), which has been ranked as one of the top fifty public golf courses in Canada, the Heather Glen Golf Course, and Ski Dagmar.

Also located in Ashburn is a fully wheelchair accessible working farm and registered charity, WindReach Farm. WindReach has welcomed more than 20,000 visitors with physical and/or intellectual disabilities annually and works with nearly 350 community organizations. Its Para-Dressage CPEDI3 competition attracts elite para-equestrian athletes from around the world.

== Transportation ==
Ashburn is easily accessible from Highway 407, which begins 17 kilometres south-west of the hamlet in the village of Brougham. Highway 7 and Highway 12 pass through the neighbouring hamlet of Myrtle, 3 kilometres east of Ashburn, leading south through Whitby to Highway 401 (17 kilometres) and north to the Trans-Canada Highway (35 kilometres). Myrtle Road is an important local east-west corridor, which has created safety concerns for walkers around the hamlet's main intersection at Ashburn Road.

In 1990, Via Rail ceased passenger service on the Havelock-Peterborough-Toronto line, which runs across the northern edge of Ashburn and stops in the neighbouring hamlet of Myrtle Station. In recent years, there has been significant local, federal and provincial support for a plan to restore passenger service to this line. The station would complement growth projections for the north end of Whitby.

A future opportunity and challenge to the community of Ashburn and its neighbours is the proposed development of an international airport 12 kilometers west of the village on the Pickering Airport lands. Under the current plan, the approach for one of the three landing strips would be directly south of Ashburn, with planes descending near the hamlet from an elevation of 521 metres to 480 metres. The plan anticipates 11.9 million passengers per year (or 32,600 per day) by 2032. A "Needs Assessment Study" was completed by the Greater Toronto Airports Authority for the federal government in May 2010. After a "due diligence review," Transport Canada released the report in July 2011.

== Festivals ==
Annually the community hosts Ashburn Canada Day Festivities at Ashburn Park.
