= Cyril Greenland =

Canadian psychiatrist

- Born: Cyril Grundland; December 20, 1919; Aberdare, Wales, U.K.
- Died: January 1, 2012 (aged 92)

Academic background
- Education: University of Birmingham

Academic work
- Discipline: Social work
- Institutions: McMaster University

Cyril Greenland (died January 1, 2012) was a Canadian psychiatrist and social worker known for his focus on humane treatment of patients and advocacy for social policy.

== Early life and education ==
Cyril Grundland was born on December 20, 1919, to impoverished Jewish parents in Aberdare, Wales. The second of five children, the family lived in Bethnal Green, a neighborhood in the East End of London. He was greatly influenced by his mother, Annie, who raised the children as a single mother and taught them to be generous. When he was 16, Grundland left home to apprentice under a watchmaker. He later studied social work at the London School of Economics, where he and his eldest brother changed their surname to Greenland to obscure their Jewish heritage.

Greenland later pursued a Master's at the University of Wales at Bangor (1968) and a PhD at the University of Birmingham (1984).

== Career ==
In 1958, Greenland emigrated to Canada from the United Kingdom, where he became director of social work at the Whitby Psychiatric Hospital in Whitby, Ontario. There, he oversaw the treatment of a ward of men known to be difficult; Greenland was able to ascertain that the men's difficult behavior, such as walking around naked, was due to material issues, such as all clothing being extra large, but patients not being given belts. Many of the men under Greenland's purview were later released into the community.

From 1960 to 1966, Greenland was employed by the Ontario government to work on emptying the province's psychiatric hospitals. In 1966, he began work at the newly founded Clarke Institute of Psychiatry, where he studied violence in mental illness.

He was a professor of social work and associate professor of psychiatry at McMaster University in Hamilton from 1970 until his retirement in 1984. In 1990, he co-founded an archive of materials about the history of psychiatry in Canada.

== Personal life and death ==
Greenland was married to Jane Donald (d. 1990), a psychiatric nurse whom he met while working at Crichton Royal Hospital in Dumfries, Scotland. The couple had five children.

Greenland died on January 1, 2012 from leukemia; he was 92.

== Publications ==
=== Books ===
- Mental Illness and Civil Liberty. 1970.
- Vision Canada. Toronto: Leonard Crainford Associates Ltd. 1976.
- Preventing C.A.N. Deaths. London: Tavistock Publications. 1987.
- TPH: History and Memories of the Toronto Psychiatric Hospital, 1925-1966; co-written with Edward Shorter

=== Articles ===
- "One hundred years of Scottish lunacy legislation: A critical review". Public Health. 72 (1): 147–155. 1958-04-01. doi:10.1016/S0033-3506(58)80033-5. ISSN 0033-3506.
- "Three Pioneers of Canadian Psychiatry". JAMA: The Journal of the American Medical Association. 200 (10): 833. 1967-06-05. doi:10.1001/jama.1967.03120230085012. ISSN 0098-7484.
- "The prediction and management of dangerous behavior: Social policy issues". International Journal of Law and Psychiatry. 1 (2): 205–221. 1978-01-01. doi:10.1016/0160-2527(78)90016-X. ISSN 0160-2527.
- "Inquiries into Child Abuse and Neglect (C.A.N.) Deaths in the United Kingdom". The British Journal of Criminology. 26 (2): 164–173. April 1986. doi:10.1093/oxfordjournals.bjc.a047593. ISSN 1464-3529.
