= James Govan (disambiguation) =

James Govan (1949–2014) was an American musician.

James Govan may also refer to:

- James Govan (cricketer) (born 1966), Scottish cricketer
- James Govan (architect) of Ontario Shores Centre for Mental Health Sciences
