= Hello Beautiful (disambiguation) =

Hello Beautiful is an alternative/hip hop/rock fusion band from Whitby, Ontario, Canada.

Hello Beautiful can also refer to:

- Hello Beautiful (film), a 2025 American drama film.
- "Hello, Beautiful", a 1931 song by Maurice Chevalier, also featured in several Betty Boop films (Bimbo Express, 1931; Stopping the Show, 1932; Betty Boop's Rise to Fame, 1934)
- "Hello Beautiful", a song from the 2007 Jonas Brothers album
- "Hello, Beautiful", a song by Vic Mignogna from his 2007 album Metafiction
- The Powers Girl, sometimes retitled Hello, Beautiful, a 1943 musical comedy about women employed by a modeling agency
- Hello Beautiful!, a popular weekly radio program in Chicago about arts, architecture and culture, created and hosted by Edward Lifson
- hellobeautiful.com, a website dedicated to news and social commentary for women of color, part of Urban One
- Hello Beautiful (novel), a 2023 novel by Ann Napolitano
