= Whitby, Ontario =

Whitby
- Town (lower-tier)
- Town of Whitby
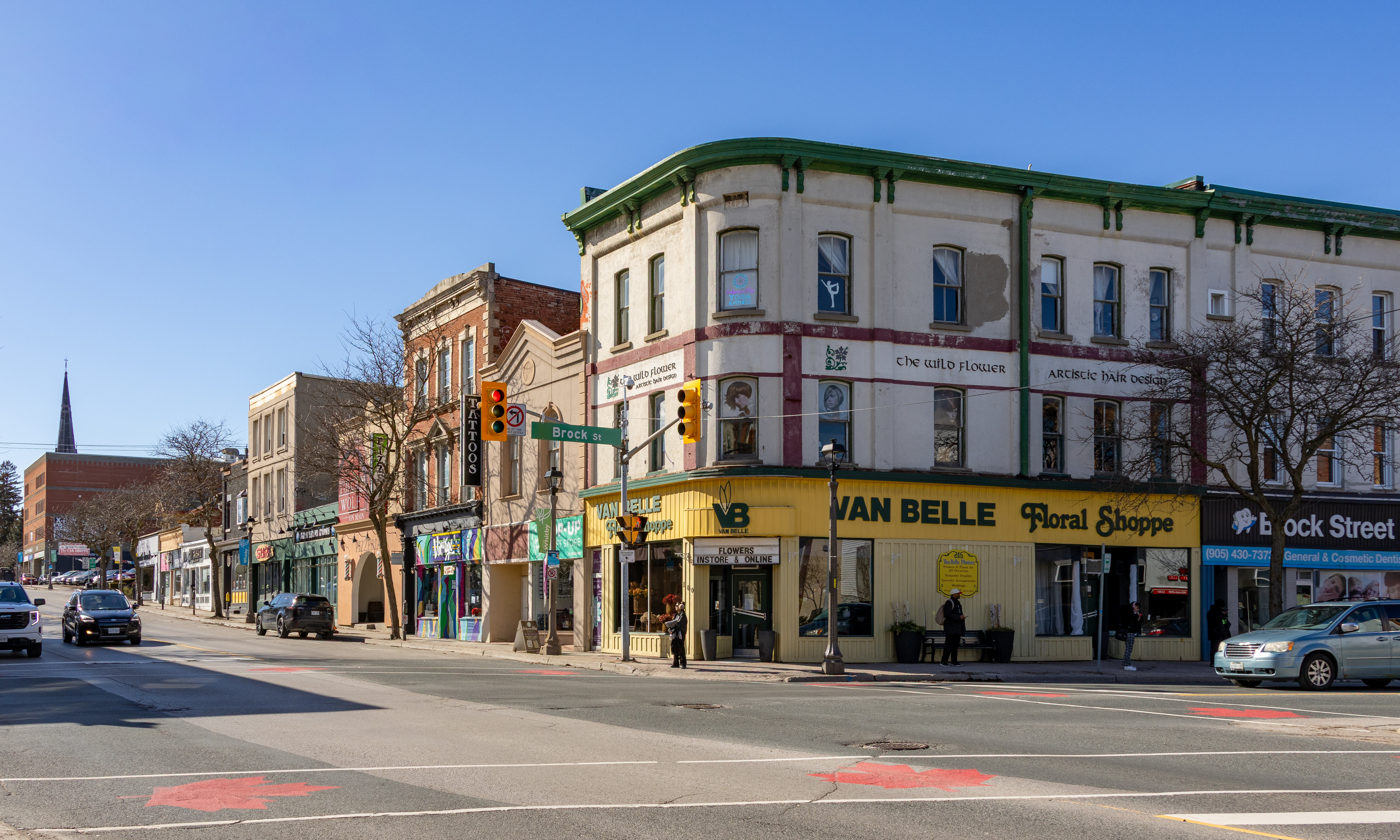
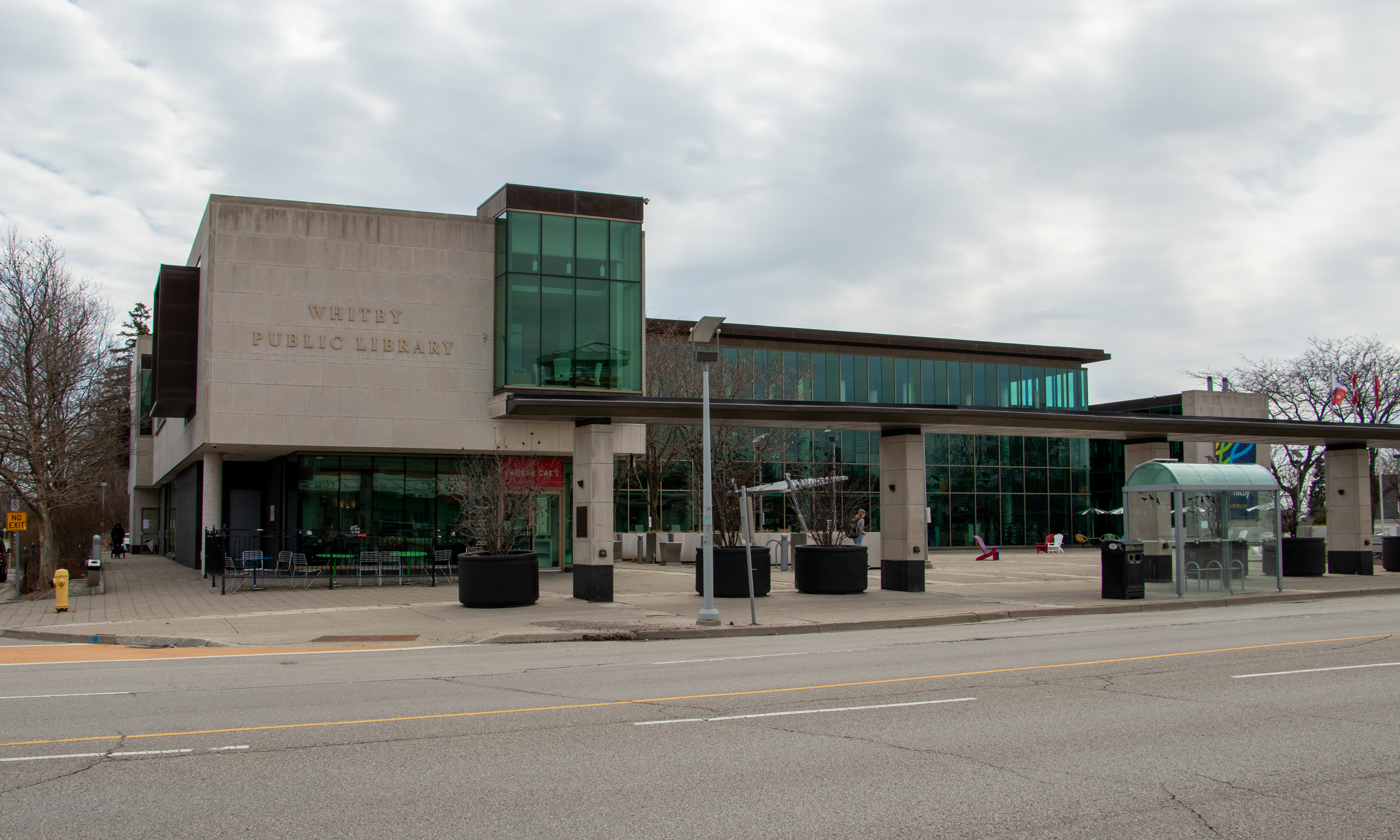
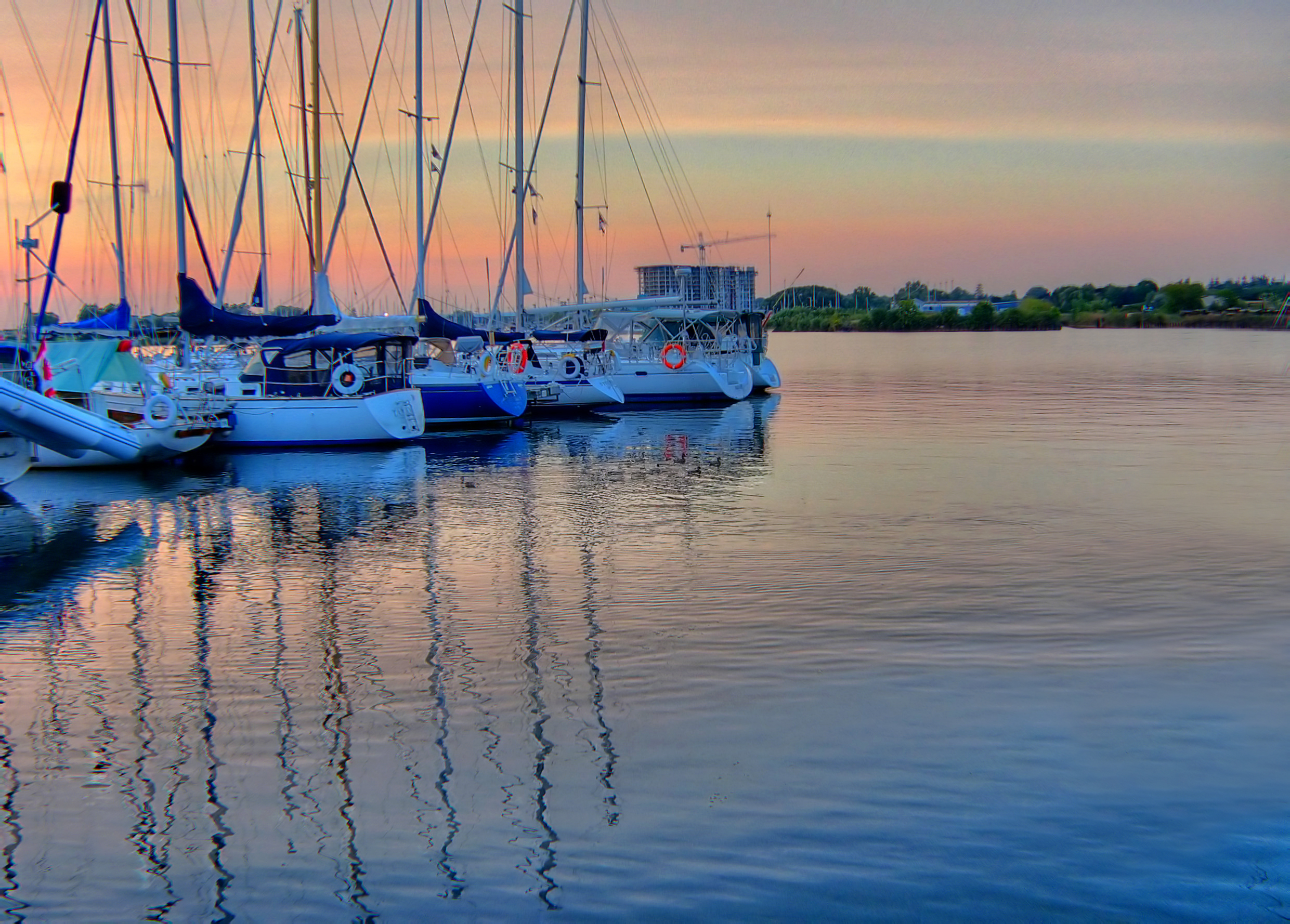
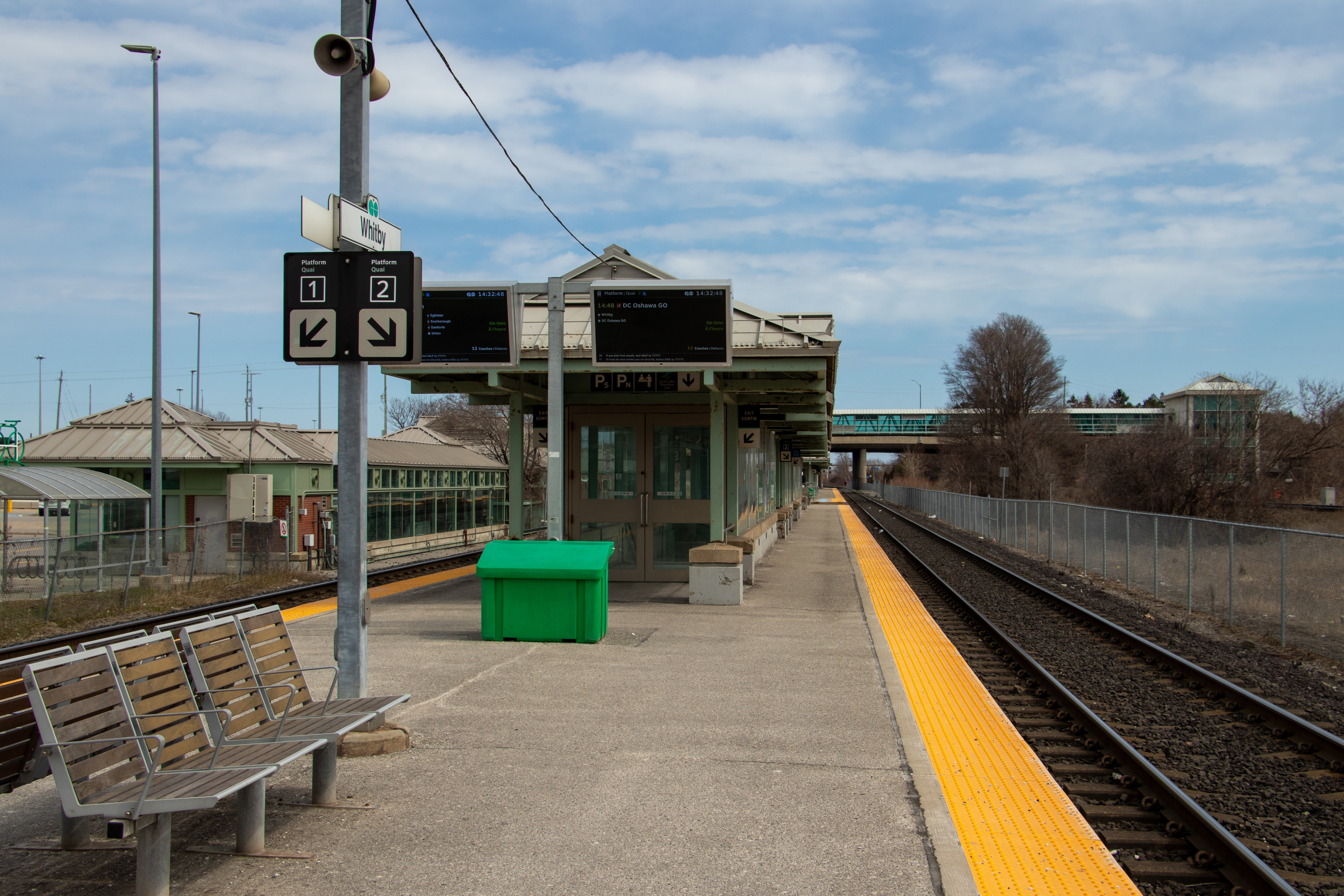
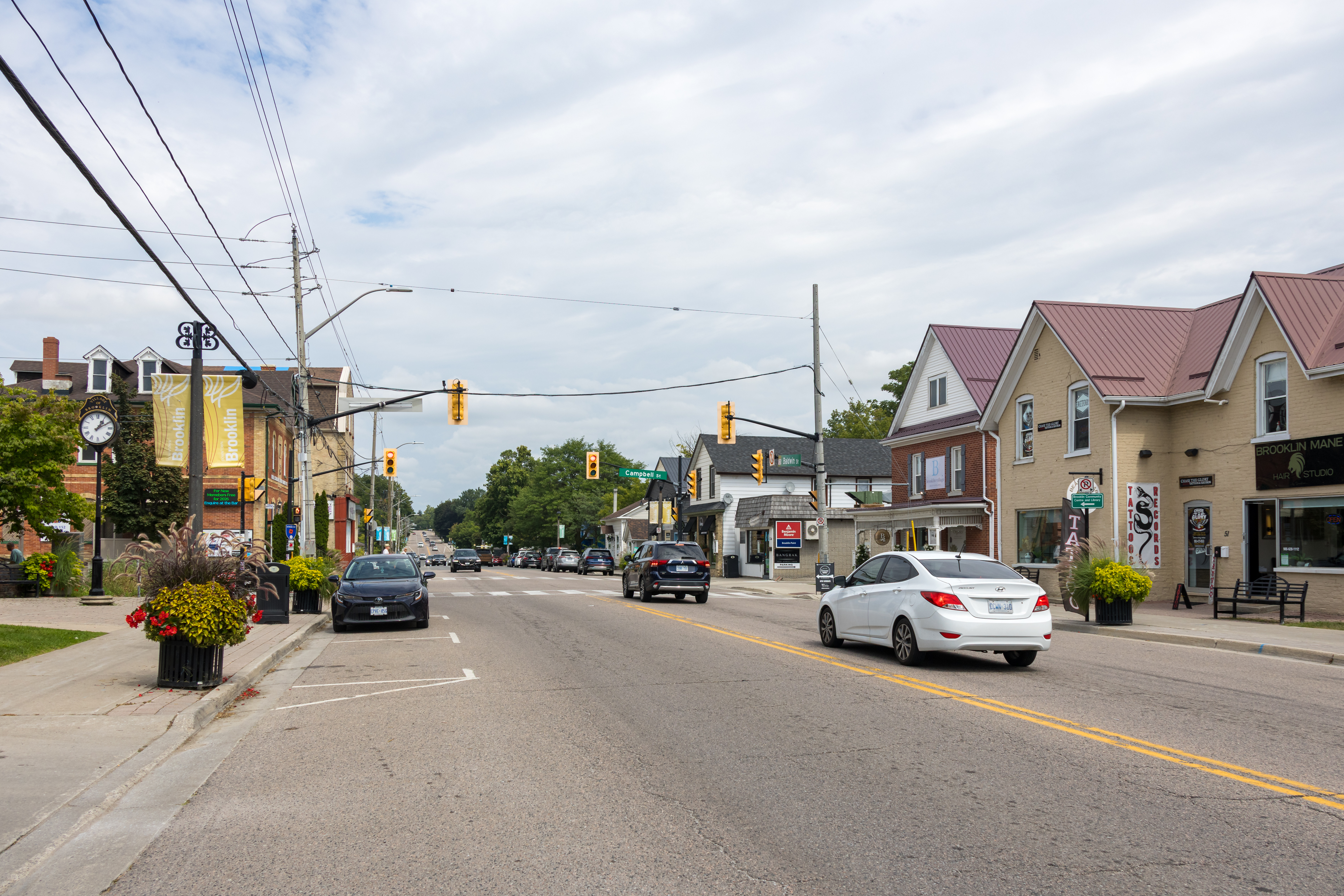
- From top, left to right: Dundas Street in Downtown Whitby, Whitby Public Library, Whitby Harbour, Whitby GO Station, Brooklin
- Motto: Durham's Business Centre
- Location within Regional Municipality of Durham Location within Southern Ontario Location within Canada Location within America
- Coordinates: 43°55′57″N 78°57′16″W
- Country: Canada
- Province: Ontario
- Region: Durham
- Incorporated: 1855

Government
  - Mayor: Elizabeth Roy
  - Regional Councillor: List: Maleeha Shahid; Chris Leahy; Steve Yamada; Rhonda Mulcahy
  - MPs: Ryan Turnbull (LPC); Juanita Nathan (LPC)
  - MPP: Lorne Coe (PC)

Area
  - Land: 146.53 km^{2} (56.58 sq mi)
- Elevation: 91 m (299 ft)

Population (2021)
  - Total: 138,501 (Ranked 40th)
  - Density: 944.2/km^{2} (2,445/sq mi)
- Time zone: UTC−05:00 (EST)
  - Summer (DST): UTC−04:00 (EDT)
- Website: whitby.ca

Whitby is a town in Durham Region in Ontario, Canada. Whitby is located in Southern Ontario 11 km (6.8 mi) east of Ajax and 8 km (5.0 mi) west of Oshawa, on the north shore of Lake Ontario and is home to the headquarters of Durham Region. It had a population of 138,501 at the 2021 census. It is approximately 39.75 km (24.70 mi) east of Toronto, and it is known as a commuter suburb in the Durham Region, a part of the Greater Toronto Area. While the southern portion of Whitby is predominantly urban and an economic hub, the northern part of the municipality is more rural and includes the communities of Ashburn, Brooklin, Myrtle, Myrtle Station, and Macedonian Village. On the western boundary is Almond Village.

== History ==
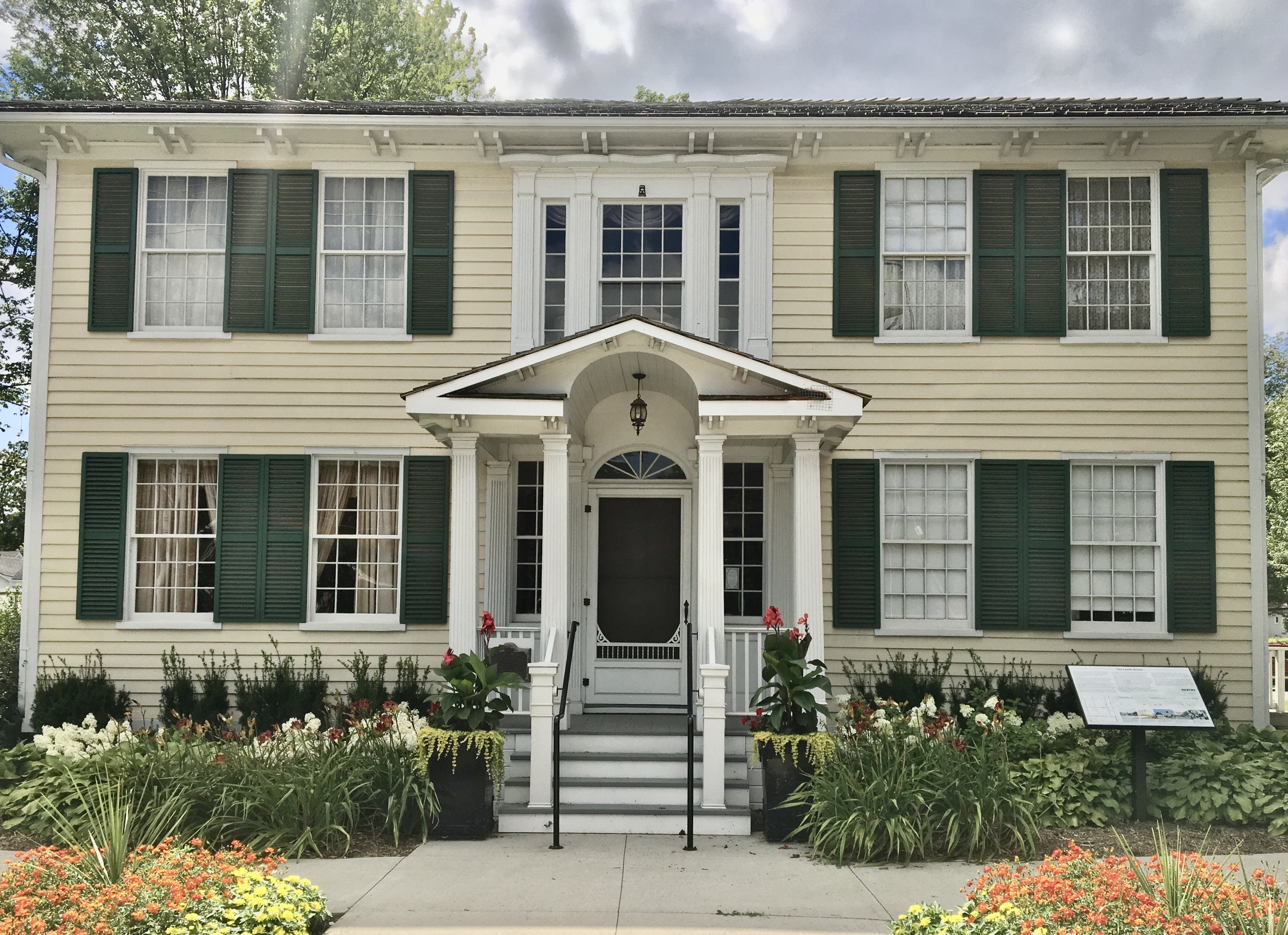
Lynde House Museum, c. 1812

Whitby Township (now the Town of Whitby) was named after the seaport town of Whitby, Yorkshire, England.

When the township was originally surveyed in 1792, the surveyor, from the northern part of England, named the townships east of Toronto after towns in the historic North Riding of Yorkshire: York, Scarborough, Pickering, Whitby and Darlington. The original name of "Whitby" is Danish, dating from about 867 AD when the Danes invaded Britain. It is a contraction of "Whitteby", meaning "White Village". The allusion may be to the white lighthouse on the pier at Whitby, Yorkshire, and also at Whitby, Ontario. Although settlement dates back to 1800, it was not until 1836 that a downtown business centre was established by Whitby's founder Peter Perry.

Whitby's chief asset was its fine natural harbour on Lake Ontario, from which grain from the farmland to the north was first shipped in 1833. In the 1840s, a road was built from Whitby Harbour to Lake Simcoe and Georgian Bay, to bring trade and settlement through the harbour to and from the rich hinterland to the north. The Town of Whitby was chosen as the seat of government for the newly formed County of Ontario in 1852, and incorporated in 1855. The remainder of Whitby Township remained a separate municipality, although the eastern half surrounding Oshawa was incorporated as the new Township of East Whitby in 1857. In the 1870s, a railway, the "Port Whitby and Port Perry Railway", was constructed from Whitby harbour to Port Perry, and later extended to Lindsay as the "Whitby, Port Perry and Lindsay Railway".

Whitby is also the site of Trafalgar Castle School, a private girls' school founded in 1874. The building, constructed as an Elizabethan-style castle in 1859–62 as a private residence for the Sheriff of Ontario County, is a significant architectural landmark and Whitby's only provincial historic site marked with a plaque. The school celebrated its 125th anniversary in 1999.

During the Second World War, Whitby was the location of Camp X, a secret spy training facility established by Sir William Stephenson, the "Man Called Intrepid". Although the buildings have since been demolished, a monument was unveiled on the site of Camp X in 1984 by Ontario's Lieutenant Governor John Black Aird. Following the war, Soviet dissenter Igor Gouzenko was taken to the facility with his wife to live in secretive protective custody after fleeing Ottawa, Ontario.

== Amalgamation ==
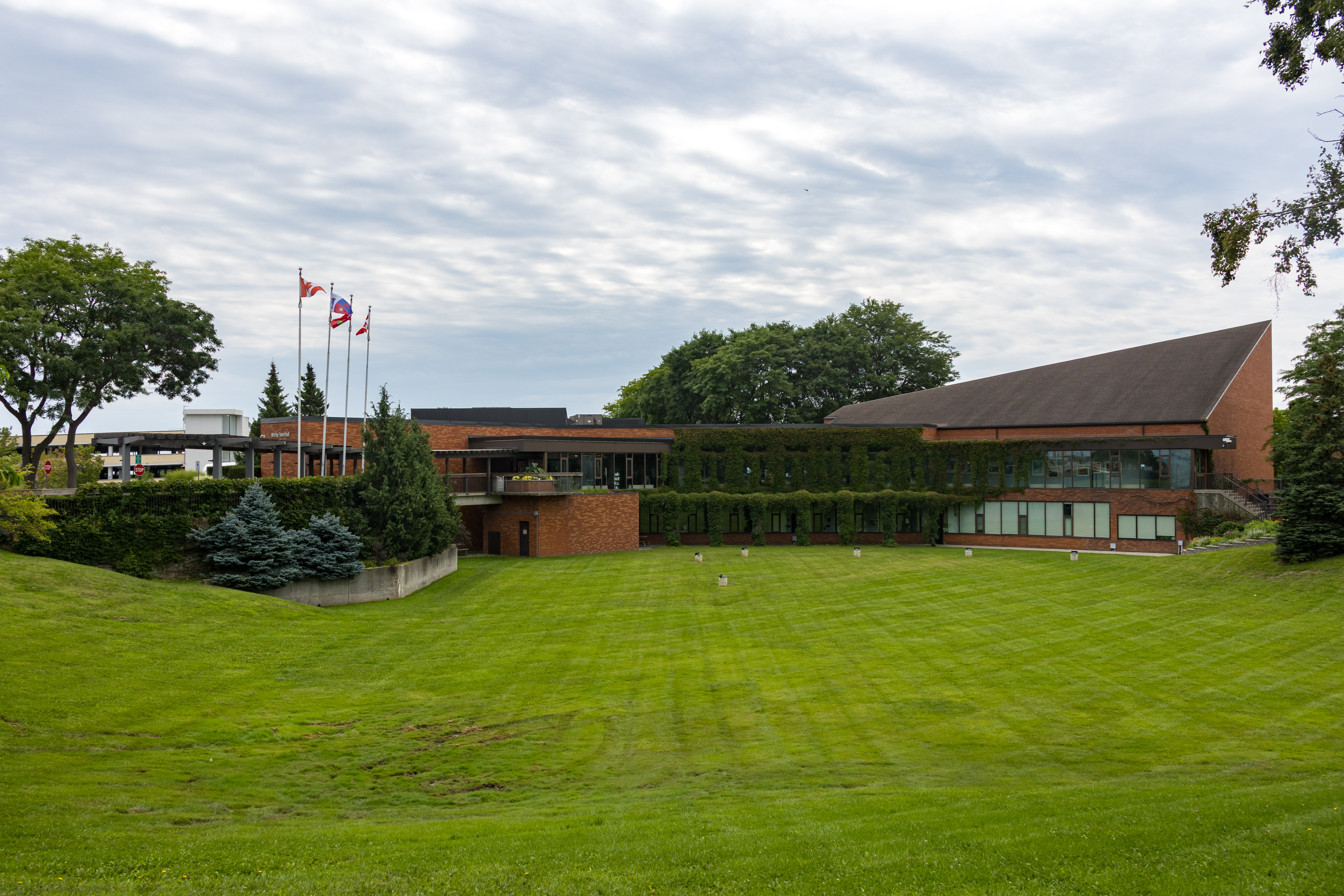
Whitby Town Hall, designed by Canadian architect Raymond Moriyama

In 1968, the Town of Whitby and Township of Whitby amalgamated to form the current municipality. Planning for the construction of a town hall intended to centralize municipal staff working in satellite offices began in 1970 under mayor Des Newman. Construction began on the Raymond Moriyama designed building in 1975; it was opened by Mayor Jim Gartshore on January 8, 1977.

Municipal boundaries were not changed during the 1974 formation of the Regional Municipality of Durham (colloquially known as Durham Region), and remain to this day. Today, Whitby is the seat of government in Durham Region.

== Geography ==
Whitby borders Ajax to the west, Pickering to the northwest, the Township of Scugog to the north, and Oshawa to the east. Since at least the mid-1990s, the development of subdivisions to accommodate population growth has proceeded in a mostly northward direction, including development in Brooklin. To the south is Lake Ontario.

== Demographics ==
Historical populations
Year	Pop.	±%
1871	2,732	—
1881	3,140	+14.9%
1891	2,786	−11.3%
1901	2,110	−24.3%
1911	2,248	+6.5%
1921	2,800	+24.6%
1931	5,046	+80.2%
1941	5,882	+16.6%
1951	7,267	+23.5%
1961	14,685	+102.1%
1971	25,324	+72.4%
1981	36,698	+44.9%
1991	61,281	+67.0%
1996	73,794	+20.4%
2001	87,413	+18.5%
2006	111,184	+27.2%
2011	122,022	+9.7%
2016	128,377	+5.2%
2021	138,501	+7.9%

In the 2021 Census of Population conducted by Statistics Canada, Whitby had a population of 138,501 living in 46,460 of its 47,389 total private dwellings, a change of 7.9% from its 2016 population of 128,377. With a land area of 146.69 km^{2} (56.64 sq mi), it had a population density of 944.2/km^{2} (2,445.4/sq mi) in 2021.

In 2021, 19.1% of the population was under 15 years of age, and 14.8% was 65 years and over. The median age in Whitby was 40 years.

The median total income of households in 2020 for Whitby was $123,000.

=== Religion ===
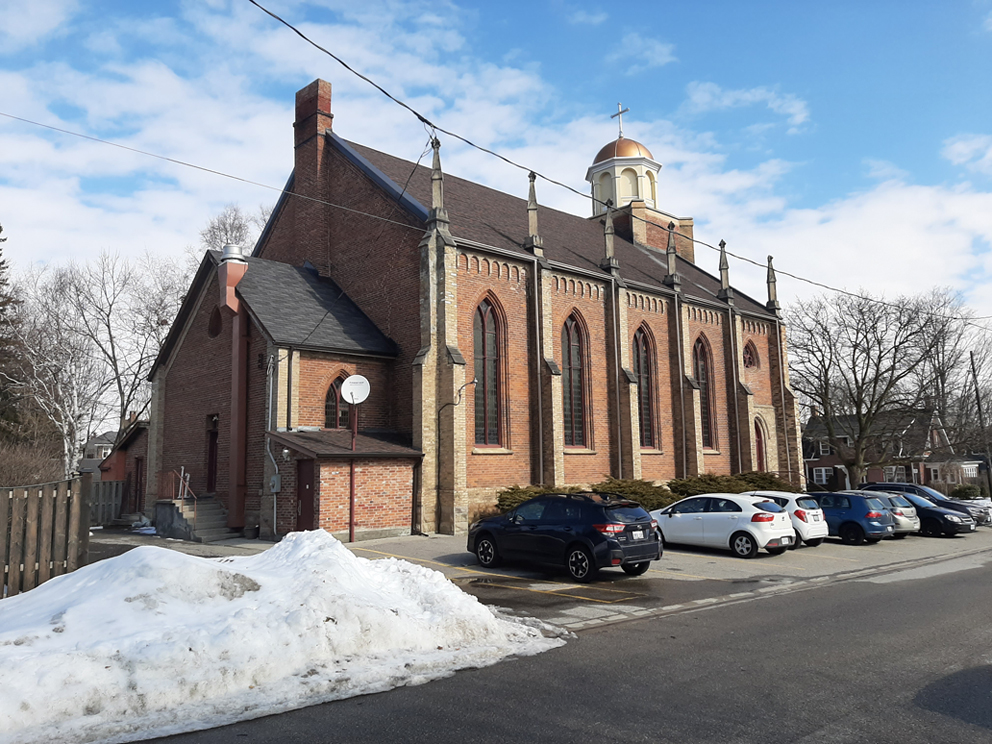
The Saint Arsenije Sremac Serbian Orthodox Church in Whitby

In 2021, 54.3% of the population identified as Christian, with Catholics (25.7%) making up the largest denomination, followed by Anglican (4.9%), United Church (4.2%), Orthodox (2.7%), and other denominations. 31.6% of the population reported no religious affiliation. Others identified as Muslim (6.7%), Hindu (5.4%), and with other religions.

=== Language ===
The 2021 census found English to be the mother tongue of 75.5% of the population. This was followed by Urdu (1.7%), Tamil (1.6%), Mandarin (1.5%), French (1.3%), Spanish (1.1%), Italian (1.0%), Tagalog (0.9%), Cantonese (0.8%), Arabic (0.7%), Hindi (0.7%), Dari (0.7%), and Portuguese (0.6%). Of the official languages, 98.7% of the population reported knowing English and 8.4% French.

=== Ethnicity ===
As per the 2021 census, the most common ethnic or cultural origins in Whitby are English (19.9%), Irish (17.1%), Scottish (16.7%), Canadian (13.7%), Italian (6.4%), German (6.2%), Indian (6.0%), French (5.4%), British Isles (4.8%), Chinese (4.3%), Jamaican (3.5%), Dutch (3.4%), and Polish (3.0%). Indigenous people made up 1.5% of the population, mostly First Nations (0.8%) and Métis (0.7%). Ethnocultural backgrounds in the town included European (63.1%), South Asian (12.0%), Black (9.1%), Chinese (3.6%), Filipino (2.6%), West Asian (1.6%), Latin American (1.2%), Arab (1.0%), and Southeast Asian (0.5%).

Panethnic groups in the Town of Whitby (2001−2021)
Panethnic group	2021		2016		2011		2006		2001	
Panethnic group	Pop.	%	Pop.	%	Pop.	%	Pop.	%	Pop.	%
European (Note: Statistic includes all persons that did not make up part of a visible minority or an indigenous identity.)	86,255	63.11%	92,700	73.12%	95,680	79.54%	90,550	81.98%	76,210	88.07%
South Asian	16,365	11.97%	8,345	6.58%	5,700	4.74%	3,680	3.33%	2,480	2.87%
African	12,395	9.07%	10,085	7.95%	7,440	6.19%	6,695	6.06%	3,055	3.53%
East Asian (Note: Statistic includes total responses of "Chinese", "Korean", and "Japanese" under visible minority section on census.)	5,755	4.21%	3,985	3.14%	2,975	2.47%	2,840	2.57%	1,860	2.15%
Southeast Asian (Note: Statistic includes total responses of "Filipino" and "Southeast Asian" under visible minority section on census.)	4,230	3.1%	3,075	2.43%	2,595	2.16%	1,525	1.38%	460	0.53%
Middle Eastern (Note: Statistic includes total responses of "West Asian" and "Arab" under visible minority section on census.)	3,505	2.56%	2,220	1.75%	1,385	1.15%	1,365	1.24%	540	0.62%
Latin American	1,655	1.21%	1,340	1.06%	995	0.83%	780	0.71%	315	0.36%
Indigenous	2,085	1.53%	1,995	1.57%	1,485	1.23%	1,175	1.06%	560	0.65%
Other (Note: Statistic includes total responses of "Visible minority, n.i.e." and "Multiple visible minorities" under visible minority section on census.)	4,420	3.23%	3,030	2.39%	2,030	1.69%	1,825	1.65%	1,060	1.23%
Total responses	136,665	98.67%	126,785	98.76%	120,290	98.58%	110,455	99.34%	86,530	98.99%
Total population	138,501	100%	128,377	100%	122,022	100%	111,184	100%	87,413	100%

- Note: Totals greater than 100% due to multiple origin responses.

== Local government ==
Interactive map of Whitby wards

The Town's Council includes the Mayor, four Regional Councillors and four Town Councillors elected on the basis of one per ward. They sit on both the Town and Durham Regional Councils, as does the mayor. The members elected as of the 2022 municipal election are:

=== Mayor ===
- Elizabeth Roy

=== Regional councillors ===
- Rhonda Mulcahy
- Chris Leahy
- Steve Yamada
- Maleeha Shahid

=== Town councillors ===
- North Ward 1: Steve Lee
- West Ward 2: Matt Cardwell
- Centre Ward 3: Niki Lundquist
- East Ward 4: Victoria Bozinovski

=== Town Halls ===
From 1879 to 1960 the Town Hall was located at the former Hopkins' Music Hall.

=== Regional chair ===
- John Henry

Whitby is also home to the headquarters buildings of Durham Region and the Durham District School Board.

== Emergency services ==
Whitby is policed by the Durham Regional Police's Central West Division. There is also a detachment of the Ontario Provincial Police located in Town, mainly to patrol area provincial highways within Durham Region. Whitby Fire & Emergency Services provides firefighting services from five fire stations and ambulance/emergency medical services are provided by Durham Region EMS at the Whitby Paramedic Station (also as EMS Headquarters).

== Economy ==
Many residents commute to work in other Greater Toronto Area communities. Whitby itself is home to a steel mill operated by Gerdau Ameristeel, a retail support centre operated by Sobeys, and a major Liquor Control Board of Ontario warehouse. Other companies present in Whitby include pharmaceutical manufacturer Patheon, Lear Corporation, Automodular Assemblies, McGraw-Hill Ryerson, and several others.

== Education ==
Public education in Whitby is provided via the Durham District School Board, which also has its headquarters in Whitby. There are twenty-four elementary schools and five secondary schools: Anderson Collegiate Vocational Institute, Brooklin High School, Donald A Wilson Secondary School, Henry Street High School and Sinclair Secondary School.

The Durham Catholic District School Board oversees public Catholic education in Durham Region. There are twelve Catholic elementary schools and two secondary schools- Father Leo J. Austin Catholic Secondary School and All Saints Catholic Secondary School.

Full French-language education is provided by the Conseil scolaire catholique MonAvenir. There is one elementary school in Whitby, École élémentaire catholique Jean-Paul II (JK-grade 6), as well as a high school, École secondaire catholique St-Charles Garnier (grades 7-12) which services all of Durham Region.

As noted above, Whitby is home to Trafalgar Castle School, an independent school for women that offers grades 4 through 12 in a university preparatory programme. Built in 1859 by the Sheriff of Ontario County, Nelson Gilbert "Iron" Reynolds, Trafalgar Castle remains a unique Canadian treasure. The school opened its doors in 1874 and was called "Ontario Ladies' College" until 1979 when the name was changed to "Trafalgar Castle School".

There are also a number of Montessori schools offering programmes for early elementary grades.

Whitby is also the site of the Skills Training Centre of Durham College. The main campus of the college is located in Oshawa, as is Ontario Tech University. Canada Christian College is located in Whitby as well.

== Healthcare ==
Although Whitby is one of the 100 largest cities/towns in Canada, it lacks a full-service hospital. The town was served by the Whitby General Hospital until 1998, when Durham hospitals were amalgamated by the Lakeridge Health Corporation, Under the amalgamated system, the hospital became Lakeridge Health Whitby and is a specialized health centre, with the closest full-service hospitals being Lakeridge Health Oshawa, Lakeridge Health Ajax and Pickering and Lakeridge Health Port Perry.

The Ontario Shores Centre for Mental Health Sciences is located on the lakefront. It was originally called the Whitby Psychiatric Hospital, then Whitby Mental Health Centre.

== Transportation ==
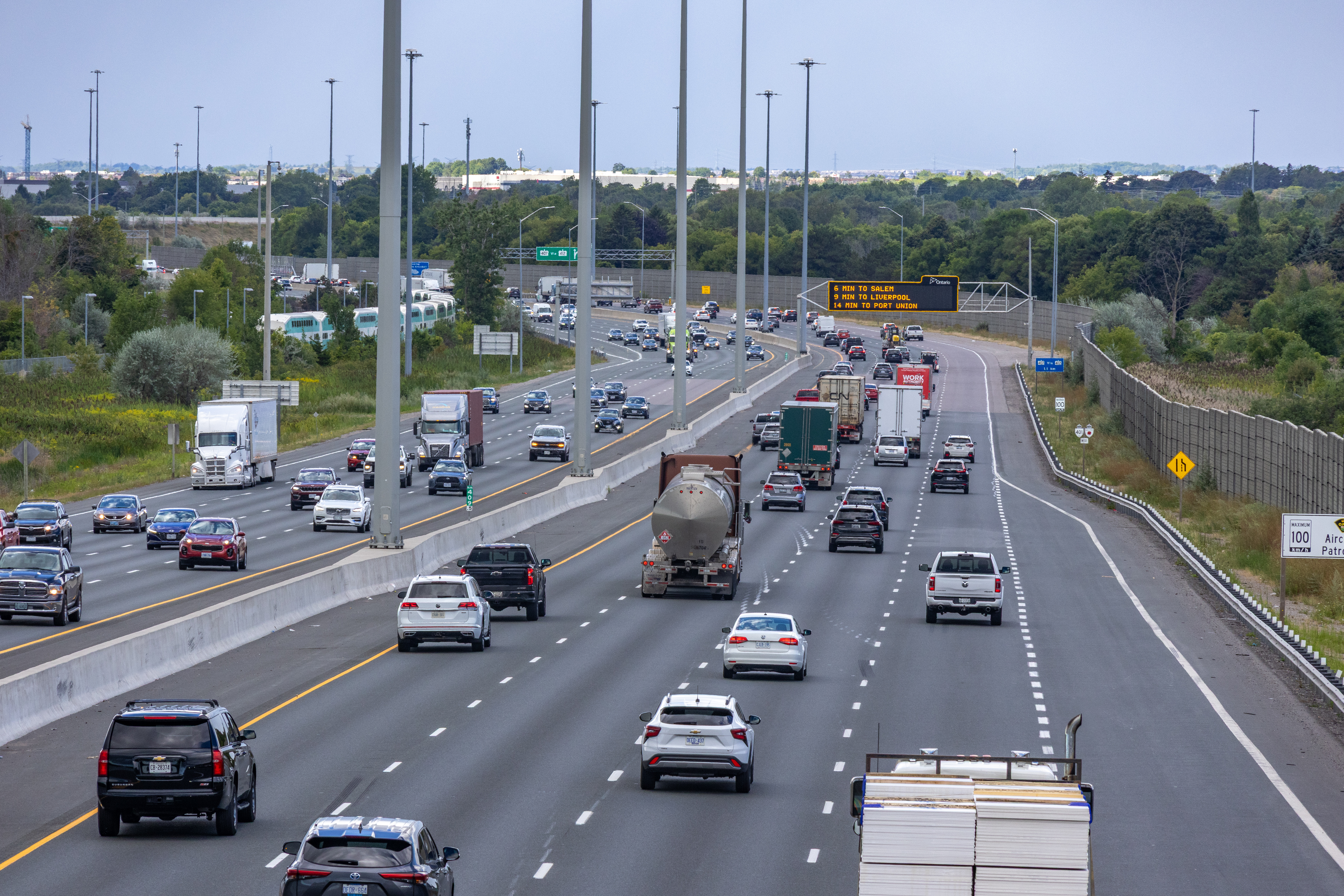
Looking west along Highway 401 from the Henry Street overpass towards the Highway 412 interchange

Ontario Highway 401 runs through the south end of Whitby, with interchanges at Brock Street and Thickson Road. Ontario Highway 407 was opened in Whitby in 2016. The toll highway passes between Brooklin and the urban portion of the town. Ontario Highway 412, connecting the 401 with the 407, also opened to traffic in the same year. The highway is a north–south route located just east of the Whitby-Ajax boundary and became toll-free on April 22, 2022.

The southern terminus of Highway 12 is also located in Whitby. It originally extended from Highway 401 northward as part of Brock Street, but this portion was downloaded to Durham Region in 1997. The southern terminus is now located just south of Brooklin at Highway 407. Finally, Highway 7 runs east–west between Brooklin and the City of Pickering. At Brooklin, the road changes to a north–south alignment and is multiplexed with Highway 12 to the northern boundary of the Town.

Four railways pass through Whitby. The Toronto-Montreal corridor main lines of the Canadian National Railway and Canadian Pacific Railway both pass east–west through the south end of town. A second CP line running from Toronto to Havelock also passes through the northern part of Whitby. Via Rail trains travel through Whitby, but the nearest station is in Oshawa. Finally, GO Transit provides frequent service via its Lakeshore East line, which (in Whitby) runs parallel to the CN tracks. Whitby GO Station is located in town.

Local transit services are provided by the region-wide Durham Region Transit. Prior to the Regional service, the Town provided its own service. GO Transit buses also connect Whitby with Durham Region (including Port Perry and Beaverton to the north) and areas further afield.

Whitby Harbour, an important factor in the development of the Town, is now home to a 420-berth recreational marina.

The closest international airport is Toronto Pearson International Airport, located 65 kilometres (40 mi) to the west in Mississauga.

== Media ==
Whitby was served by the Whitby This Week newspaper, part of the Metroland Media Group until publication ceased on September 15, 2023. Several other papers have been published in the town over the years, including the Whitby Free Press, which ran from 1971 to 1996. On April 8, 2026, Whitby This Week returned to the community on a monthly basis. Other GTA news outlets do serve the area of Whitby.

In North Whitby, the Brooklin Town Crier serves approximately 8,000 residents every two weeks. The Brooklin Town Crier was established in 2000 by Rhonda Mulcahy, who has since been elected Regional Councillor for Whitby. The paper consists primarily of resident contributions, with occasion updates on local and regional politics from Mulcahy.

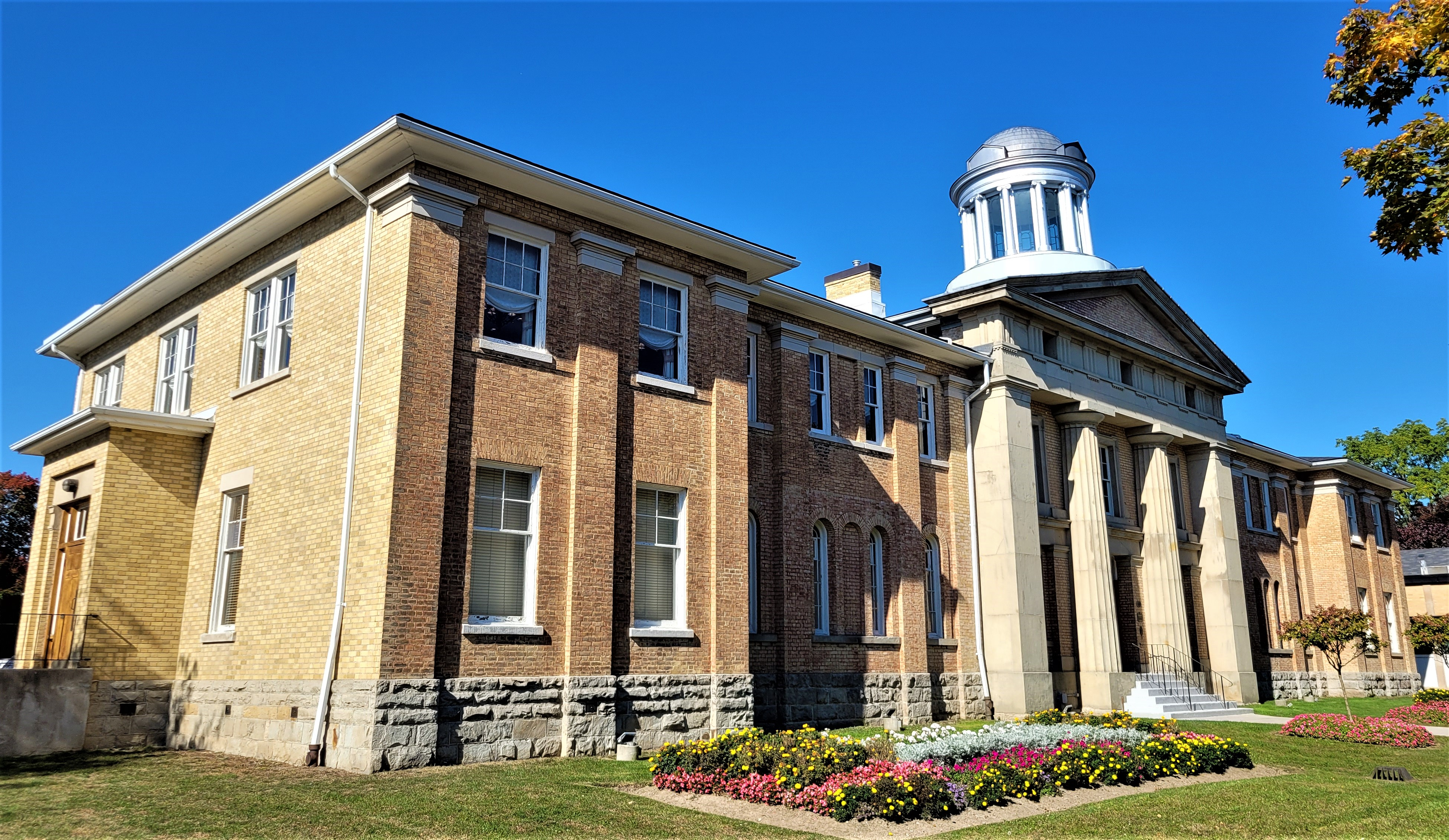
Whitby Courthouse Theater

== Arts ==
- Durham Council for the Arts
- Whitby Brass Band
- Whitby Courthouse Theatre
- Station Gallery

== Notable places ==
- Camp X
- Whitby Public Library
- Lynde House Museum
- Trafalgar Castle School
- Iroquois Park Sports Centre

== Sports ==
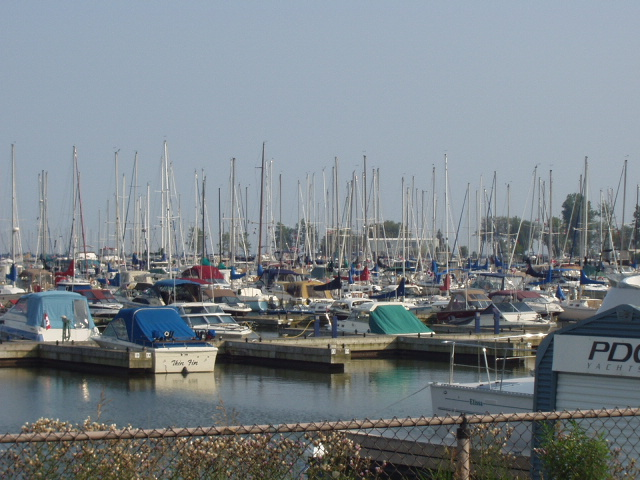
Whitby Harbour

Whitby's most famous sporting team is the Whitby Dunlops, a celebrated ice hockey squad that captured the world championship in 1958 at Oslo, Norway. This team featured long-time president of the Boston Bruins, Harry Sinden and former mayor of Whitby, Bob Attersley. The Dunlops were revived in 2004 as part of the Eastern Ontario Senior Hockey League.

The Whitby Yacht Club, which offers racing, cruising, social, and sail training programs on Whitby Harbour overlooking the Lake Ontario, was founded in 1966.

Lacrosse is also a prominent sport in Whitby. The Brooklin Redmen Senior A lacrosse club is one of the most successful in Canadian sporting history, while the Junior A Whitby Warriors have been awarded the Minto Cup four times since 1984.

Whitby is also home to the Iroquois Park Sports Centre, one of the largest minor sports centres in North America. The facility includes six icepads, a swimming pool named for local Olympian Anne Ottenbrite, six tennis courts, five ball diamonds, three batting cages, a skatepark, a soccer pitch, The Sports Garden Cafe restaurant and the Whitby Sports Hall of Fame. Whitby also developed the McKinney Sports complex which boasts three ice pads, two tennis courts and a skatepark, and Luther Vipond Arena in Brooklin, with one ice pad. These three sport complexes hold many sporting events.

In 2008, the OJHL relocated a team to Whitby to play out of the Iroquois Complex, known as the Whitby Fury.

== Notable people ==
- Lorne Edgar Campbell, outlaw biker

=== Athletics ===
- David Ayres, former NHL hockey goalie and Zamboni driver
- David Branch, commissioner of the Canadian Hockey League and Ontario Hockey League
- Drake Caggiula, NHL hockey player for the Pittsburgh Penguins
- Adam Foote, former NHL player for Colorado Avalanche, Stanley Cup winner, Olympic Gold Medalist and former member of Team Canada
- Zack Greer, plays for the Las Vegas Desert Dogs of the NLL.
- Jay Harrison, former NHL hockey player
- John LaFontaine, member of the New England Black Wolves of the NLL
- James Logan, former hockey player for the Berlin Dutchmen
- Priscilla Lopes-Schliep, bronze medallist in the hurdles at the 2008 Olympics
- Teri MacDonald (born 1963), racing driver
- Andrew Martin (1975–2009), WWE wrestler, best known by his ring name, "Test"
- Lori Melien, Olympic Bronze Medallist swimmer
- Aaron Milton (born 1992), Canadian football player
- James Neal, NHL hockey player, currently an Unrestricted Free Agent.
- Joe Nieuwendyk, former NHL hockey player, Stanley Cup winner, Olympic Gold Medalist and former member of Team Canada, Hockey Hall of Fame Inductee (2011)
- Anne Ottenbrite, Olympic Gold Medalist swimmer
- Cearah Parchment, women's collegiate basketball player for the Illinois Fighting Illini
- J. F. Paxton (1857–1936), Canadian ice hockey administrator
- Cole Perfetti, NHL hockey player for the Winnipeg Jets
- Dyshawn Pierre, Professional basketball player, playing for Fenerbahçe S.K. (basketball) in the Turkish Basketbol Süper Ligi
- Keith Primeau, former NHL hockey player
- Wayne Primeau, former NHL hockey player
- Gavin Prout, National Lacrosse League player with Colorado Mammoth
- Paul Ranger, former NHL hockey player
- Liam Reddox, former NHL hockey player
- Gary Roberts, former NHL player
- O. J. Santiago, NFL football player
- Tyler Seguin, NHL hockey player for the Dallas Stars
- Kailen Sheridan, pro soccer player, Olympian, alternate goalkeeper of the Rio 2016 team
- Olivia Smith, professional soccer player for Women's Super League club Arsenal
- Kristina Vaculik, member of the London 2012 Olympic artistic gymnastics team, who helped Canada place fifth in the team finals
- Kelita Zupancic, Judoka and Olympian, member of the London 2012 Canadian Olympic Judo team also World Ranked No. 1 in 2013

=== Entertainment ===
- Aaron Badgley, music journalist and radio host
- Kat Burns and Kyle Donnelly of the band Forest City Lovers
- Chuck Coles, singer/songwriter for the Organ Thieves, southern and soul-influenced experimental hard rock band
- A. J. Cook, actress
- Neil Crone, actor and writer for local newspaper, stars on kid's television show Really Me
- Dave Devall, long-time weather reporter for CFTO-TV
- Hello Beautiful, band
- May Irwin, businesswoman, pioneer film actress, singer and star of vaudeville, participant in first screen kiss in cinematic history in Thomas Edison's 1896 film The Kiss
- K-os, rapper, singer, songwriter and record producer
- Leslie McFarlane, the first writer of the Hardy Boys novels
- Andrea Muizelaar, winner of Canada's Next Top Model
- Priyanka, winner of the first season of Canada's Drag Race
- Protest The Hero, progressive metal band
- J. Torres, comic book writer

=== Politics ===
- Sid Ryan, president of the Ontario Federation of Labour
- John Wilson Bengough, political cartoonist
- Jim Flaherty, late member of the House of Commons of Canada and Minister of Finance
- Hamar Greenwood, Chief Secretary for Ireland 1920–1922
- Thomas Paxton, Ontario politician, businessman, sheriff

== Sister cities ==
- Feldkirch, Vorarlberg, Austria
- Longueuil, Canada
- Whitby, United Kingdom

== See also ==
- Cullen Gardens and Miniature Village (a major tourist attraction, now closed)
