= Sinclair Secondary School =

Location
- 380 Taunton Road East; Whitby, Ontario, L1R 2K5; Canada; 43.9198°N 78.9413°W

Information
- School type: Public
- Motto: "A Reputation of Excellence"
- Founded: 1994
- School board: Durham District School Board
- Principal: David Sasseville
- Grades: 9-12 (13 in Special Cases)
- Enrolment: 1,000 (2020/2021)
- Language: English, French
- Colours: Green and blue
- Mascot: Celtics
- Website: www.ddsb.ca/school/sinclairss/Pages/default.aspx

Sinclair Secondary School is located in Whitby, Ontario, Canada, and opened in 1994. The school is recognized for its strong academic reputation and remains the highest ranked school in the Durham Region, according to the Fraser Institute's Ontario Secondary School Report Card program.

== Notable alumni and faculty ==
- Delroy Clarke (born 1982), Faculty, Canadian football player
- Aaron Milton (born 1992), Alumni, Canadian football player
- Ana Padurariu (born 2002), Alumni, Canadian artistic gymnast, 2018 World Gymnastics Championship silver place medalist on beam
- Karl Svoboda (born 1963), Faculty, formal professional Canadian rugby player

== See also ==
- Education in Ontario
- List of secondary schools in Ontario
