= Macedonian Village, Ontario =

Macedonian Village
- Rural residential hamlet
- Location within Ontario Location within Canada
- Coordinates: 43°55′58″N 78°59′41″W
- Country: Canada
- Province: Ontario
- Regional municipality: Durham
- Town: Whitby
- Established: 1945
- Time zone: UTC-5 (EST)
  - Summer (DST): UTC-4 (EDT)
- Area codes: 905 and 289

Macedonian Village is a rural residential hamlet in Whitby, Durham Region, Ontario, Canada.

== History ==
The settlement was founded around 1945 by families from Macedonia who had first settled in nearby Toronto.

Phillips-Kozaroff Park is located in the centre of Macedonian Village, where a stone cairn reads, "This park donated by Stato Kozaroff and Vasil Phillips, October 1945".

== Geography ==
Macedonian Village is located 4.5 km (2.8 mi) southwest of Brooklin and is bounded by Coronation Road on the west, and Heber Down Conservation Area on the north and east.
