= Whitby Township =

Coordinates: 43°56′13″N 78°55′00″W

Whitby Township is a geographic township and former municipality in what was Ontario County (now Durham Region), Ontario, Canada. It is now part of the Town of Whitby.

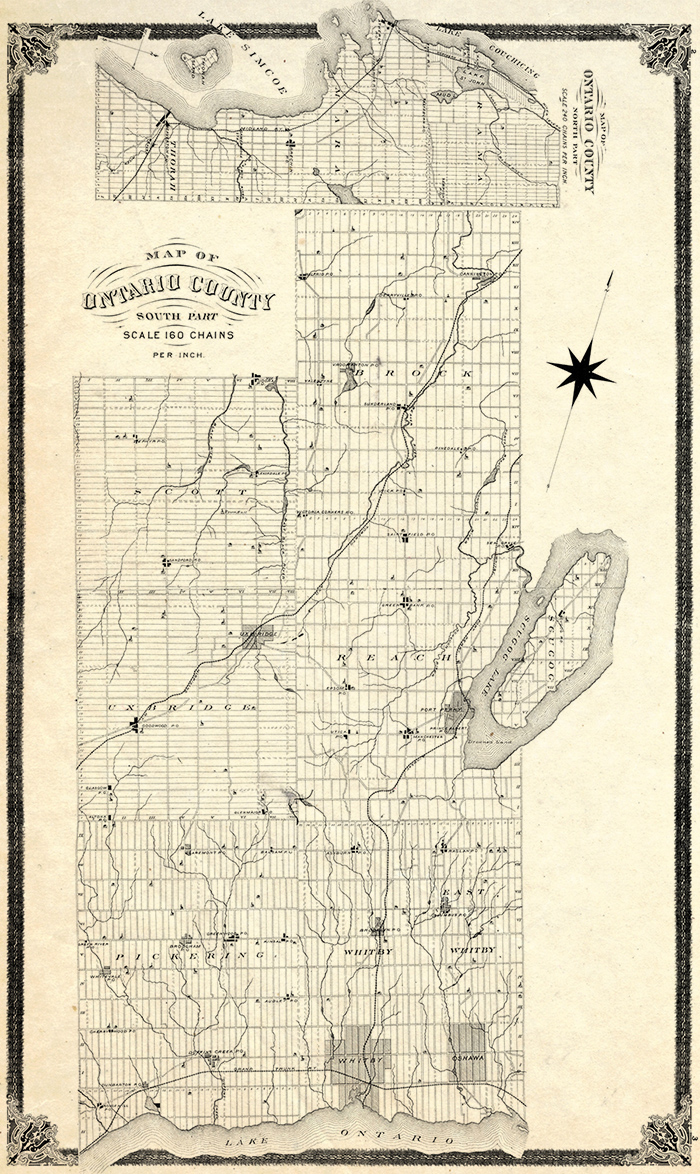
Ontario County, 1877

The Township was established in 1792 as part of what was then York County. Whitby Township was one of five townships along Lake Ontario named for towns in northeast England (York, Scarborough, Pickering, Whitby and Darlington). In 1852, the Township became part of the newly formed County of Ontario. In 1855, the Town of Whitby was incorporated as a separate municipality in the southern portion of the Township and in 1858, the Township of East Whitby was formed from the eastern portion of the municipality near Oshawa.

Whitby Township was mainly a rural municipality, but contained the communities of Brooklin, Ashburn, Myrtle and Myrtle Station.

The Township was amalgamated with Whitby in 1968 to form an expanded Town of Whitby.

== See also ==
- List of townships in Ontario
