= Aaron Milton =

Canadian football player (born 1992)

No. 28
- Position: Running back

Personal information
- Born: May 26, 1992 (age 34); Whitby, Ontario, Canada
- Listed height: 6 ft 3 in (1.91 m)
- Listed weight: 215 lb (98 kg)

Career information
- High school: Whitby (ON) Sinclair
- University: Toronto
- CFL draft: 2014: 2nd round, 15th overall pick

Career history
- 2014–2016: Edmonton Eskimos
- 2017: Saskatchewan Roughriders
- 2019: Lübeck Cougars

Awards and highlights
- Grey Cup champion (2015)
- Stats at CFL.ca

Aaron Milton (born May 26, 1992) is a Canadian former professional football running back. He was selected by the Edmonton Eskimos in the second round of the 2014 CFL draft. He played CIS football at the University of Toronto.

== Early life ==
Milton played high school football at attended Sinclair Secondary School in Whitby, Ontario. He earned athlete of the year honours three times and football most valuable player honours twice.

== College career ==
Milton played for the Toronto Varsity Blues from 2010 to 2013. He played in six games his freshman year in 2010, rushing for 247 yards and two touchdowns while recording nineteen receptions for 139 yards. He also punted nine times. Milton appeared in eight games in 2011, rushing for 524 yards and two touchdowns while catching twelve passes for 188 yards. He did not play in 2012. He played in eight games his senior season in 2013, rushing for 603 yards and one touchdown while also totaling nine receptions for 62 yards. Milton also completed a 30-yard pass attempt to Alex Pierzchalski on a trick play that went for a touchdown in 2013.

== Professional career ==
Milton was selected by the Edmonton Eskimos with the fifteenth pick in the 2014 CFL draft. He played in three games as a reserve fullback for the Eskimos his rookie year in 2014. He played in five games for the team in 2015, accumulating two special teams tackles. Milton recorded a tackle in the West final as well. The Eskimos won the 103rd Grey Cup against the Ottawa Redblacks by a score of 26–20 on November 29, 2015. He dressed in six games in 2016 and recorded his only career rushing attempt, a four-yard carry.

On February 15, 2017, Milton signed with the Saskatchewan Roughriders. He retired on May 27 for personal reasons. However, he later re-signed with the Roughriders on August 11 as a running back/linebacker. Milton dressed in three games for Saskatchewan during the 2017 season, posting two tackles on defense and two tackles on special teams. He was placed on the suspended list on September 13, 2017, after leaving the team.

Milton started a comeback in 2019, when he signed with the Lübeck Cougars in the German Football League 2.

== Personal life ==
Milton's mother played college basketball and his father played semi-professional soccer. Aaron's sister was a member of the soccer national development program.
