= Trafalgar Castle School =

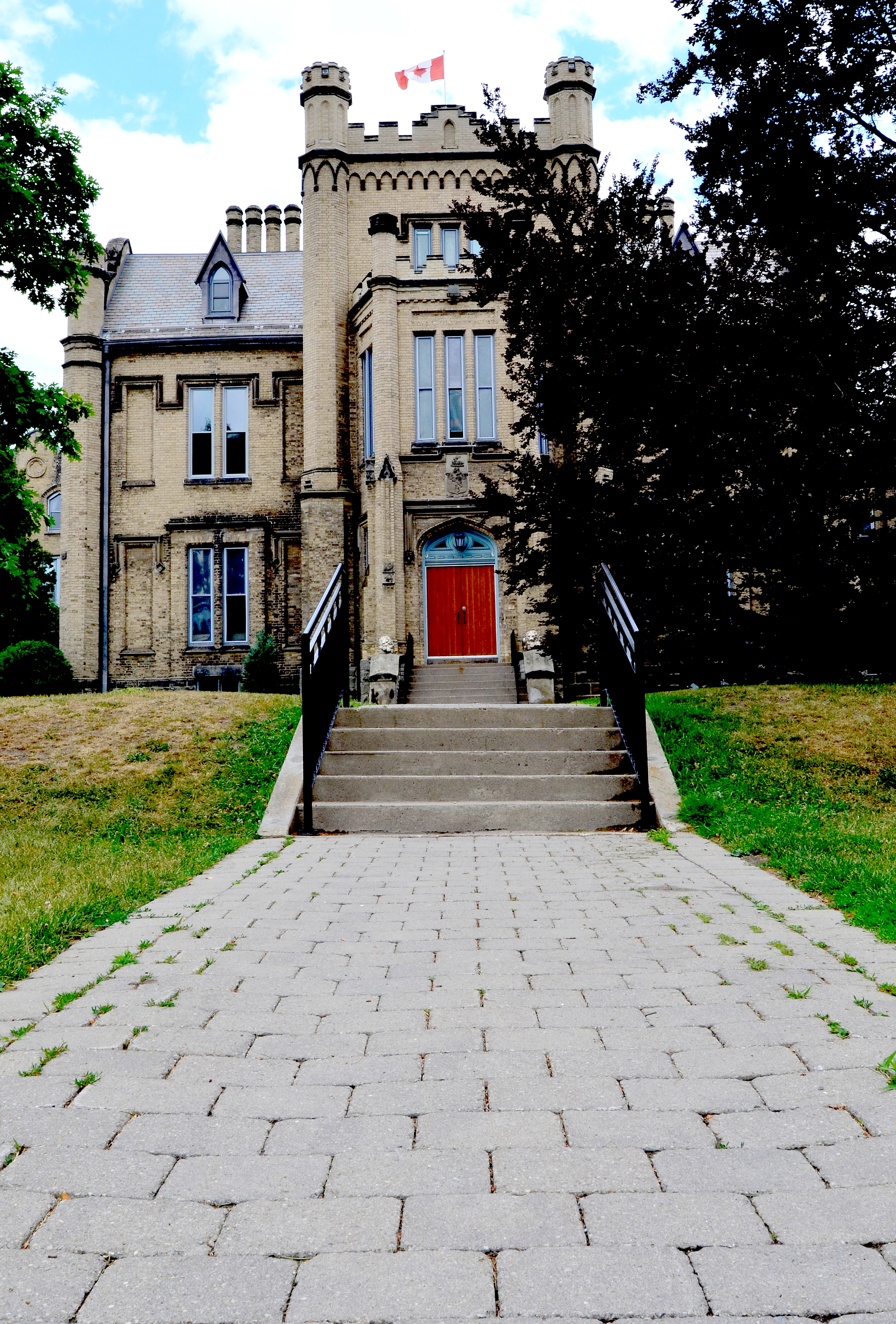

Location
- Whitby, Ontario; Canada; 43.87856°N 78.93289°W

Information
- Type: girls and young women Independent Boarding/Day
- Motto: NOTHING A TRAFALGAR GIRL CAN’T HANDLE
- Established: 1874
- Principal: Melissa Knight-Johnson
- Grades: grades 4 through 12
- Language: English
- Colours: Blue Marine and White
- Mascot: Dante the Dragon
- Affiliations: Non Denominational

Trafalgar Castle School in an independent day and boarding school in Whitby, Ontario, Canada, for girls and young women in grades 4 through 12. Boarding at the school begins in grade 7. Founded in 1874 as "Ontario Ladies' College", Trafalgar Castle School is one of the oldest independent schools in Canada and the second-oldest girls' school in Ontario.

== History ==
The castle was built by Nelson Gilbert Reynolds, Sheriff of Ontario County, as a private residence in 1859. Reynolds was named after Lord Nelson and named his castle Trafalgar in honour of the Battle of Trafalgar.

The castle was the largest private dwelling in Canada until Casa Loma was built. It cost Reynolds $70,000, which was an exorbitant sum; a home at that time was built for $2,000, and a bank complete with vault could be built for $5,000 to $7,000. Reynolds was a colourful character and a gambling man, and indeed it was gambling losses that reportedly forced him to sell his beloved home to the Methodists in 1874 for the sum of $30,000.

The Methodists of that day were very interested in establishing higher learning institutions for young women. Rev. J. E. Sanderson convinced the Town of Whitby that this would be beneficial to its economy. James Holden, Esq. founder of the Dominion Bank, a local politician and businessman (with 5 daughters of his own) supported this idea. Sanderson and Holden were instrumental in raising the money and shares for the purchase of the castle and the establishment of Ontario Ladies' College.

Trafalgar Castle hosted its share of royalty and dignitaries through the years; both as Reynolds' residence, then as Ontario Ladies' College and now as Trafalgar Castle School.

Exterior shots of the building were used as "Collinwood" in the 2012 film Dark Shadows. The building has also appeared in other films such as The Vow, starring Channing Tatum, Detroit Rock City, Strike!, The Skulls, and I Shall Never Forget.

== Student life ==
The school has approximately 240 day and boarding students, all girls from grade 4 to grade 12. While many boarders are international students, there are also domestic boarders from across Canada. The boarding program starts in grade 7. While the school was historically Methodist, students today are from all faiths and the school is considered non-denominational.

The current and 12th Head of School is Melissa Knight-Johnson. Knight-Johnson assumed the role as Head of School in July of 2023. Prior to this, Knight-Johnson was a teacher, Deputy Head and Director of Athletics for the school since 2007.

== Athletics ==
Trafalgar has teams of various age levels in the following sports:

- Basketball
- Cross Country
- Field hockey
- Soccer
- Rowing
- Swimming
- Archery
- Softball
- Track and Field
- Dance Pac
- Volleyball

== Notable alumni ==
- Meghan Patrick, country music singer.

== Notable faculty ==
- Reginald Bedford, pianist

== See also ==
- Education in Ontario
- List of secondary schools in Ontario
- CISAA
