= Hello Beautiful =

Canadian musical group

- Origin: Whitby, Ontario, Canada
- Genres: Alternative rock
- Years active: 2007–present
- Members: Cole Kidd; Charlie Royal; Kevin Walsh
- Website: Facebook

Hello Beautiful is a Canadian band from Whitby. They are known primarily for their hybrid sound of pop-rock and hip hop. They were formed by vocalist/guitarist Cole Kidd and drummer Kevin Walsh, who were later joined by vocalist Charlie Royal.

In 2008, the band had two songs, "Virginia Symphony" and "Saint Andrew's Bridge", in the top 5 of MuchMusic, and performed on MTV and Breakfast Television. They also toured with Hedley, Snoop Dogg, illScarlett, Akon, Alexisonfire, and Down with Webster.

== Soundtrack for Scenario ==
In late April 2007, Hello Beautiful recorded their full-length debut, Soundtrack for Scenario, with the help of Canadian music industry veteran Murray Daigle. The album was subsequently released a year later through a distribution deal with the independent label Bent Penny Records via the distribution company, Fontana North. Two singles were released from Soundtrack for Scenario, "Virginia Symphony", and "Saint Andrew's Bridge". Due to large fan support via request lines and internet media, the first single, "Virginia Symphony", was in heavy rotation on MuchMusic for the summer/early fall of 2008, and peaked at No. 2 on Much On Demand's Daily Top 10. Their second video, "Saint Andrew's Bridge", peaked at No. 5. Hello Beautiful was the only unsigned artist to chart that year, while all other charting artists were affiliated with a major and/or major independent label.

Toronto's Exclaim! magazine said of the band: "Their set caused a dance floor eruption and a constant interchange between the crowd and band made for an endearing set. HB got enough love from the crowd to play an encore and left the stage while the crowed [sic] raged." (Recently Reviewed, Exclaim!, Nov/08).

Soundtrack for Scenario also received praise. "Sheer noise can result from fusing Hip Hop, Rock and Punk instead of a euphonic harmony" however, "Hello Beautiful have managed to successfully mix the three types of music into one" (ChartAttack.com Aug/08).

== I Wanna Die Like This! ==
In the winter of 2009–2010, Hello Beautiful recorded an album titled I Wanna Die Like This! at Vespa Studio. It was produced by Harry Hess and Eric Ratz. Tracks include "Black & White", "Tick Tock", "Heart Beats", and "Some Days", which received radio airplay and garnered significant attention. The album is more rock based, but also has some piano-driven songs, which differs from the last album's base of blues and funk.

== Members ==
- Cole Kidd – rhythm guitar, lead vocals
- Charlie Royal – lead vocals
- Kevin Walsh – drums, backing vocals
- Steven Parker – bass guitar, piano, backing vocals
- Adam Till – lead guitar, backing vocals

== Prior members ==
- Dan Bradimore – bass guitar, keyboard/piano, backing vocals
- Darrell Wallace – lead guitar
- Buddy Taylor – lead guitar, lead chicks

== Discography ==
EPs

- Soundtrack for Scenario (2008)
- I Wanna Die Like This! (2010)
