= Ontario Shores Centre for Mental Health Sciences =

Geography
- Location: 700 Gordon Street, Whitby, Ontario, Canada
- Coordinates: 43.84827°N 78.94565°W

Organization
- Care system: OHIP
- Type: Mental health
- Affiliated university: Ontario Tech University; University of Toronto

Services
- Emergency department: No

History
- Founded: 1919 (previous facility); 1996 (current facility)

Links
- Website: www.ontarioshores.ca
- Lists: Hospitals in Canada

Ontario Shores Centre for Mental Health Sciences (Ontario Shores) is a public hospital located in Whitby, Ontario, Canada, providing a range of specialized assessment and treatment services to those living with complex and serious mental illness. Interprofessional teams provide care through safe and evidence-based approaches where successful outcomes are achieved using best clinical practices and the latest advances in research. Patients benefit from a recovery-oriented environment of care built on compassion, inspiration and hope.

In addition, through a variety of initiatives and partnerships, Ontario Shores works to raise awareness of mental illness, educate healthcare practitioners and train the next generation of mental health care specialists. Employing almost 1,200 staff, Ontario Shores offers specialized recovery-focused interprofessional programs and services designed to provide successful treatment as interprofessional teams work with patients and families throughout their journey of recovery. Assessment and crisis services are provided, as well as consultation and education.

Ontario Shores is accredited by Accreditation Canada and operates with the support of the Central East Local Health Integration Network (Central East LHIN) and the Ministry of Health. The organization is regulated by the Public Hospitals Act, the Mental Health Act, and other provincial and federal legislation.

== History ==
In 1911, the architect, James Govan, working with a team of advisory psychiatrists, physicians and government officials, presented his design for the Whitby Hospital.

Govan worked to ensure the design would be unlike that of past hospitals (dark and damp, with barred windows). The design called for sixteen cottages where patients would live while receiving treatment. In addition, each cottage was constructed in such a manner as to allow natural sunlight through the windows. Each cottage held around 60 patients. The cottages' location ensured that staff buildings and therapy facilities were within a short walking distance.

One aspect of the new mental health facility was the physical site, situated 50 kilometres (31 mi) east of Toronto. Purchased by the Provincial Government early in 1912, the grounds originally consisted of 640 acres (260 ha) of treed farmland that sloped gently to Lake Ontario. The hospital offered patients fresh air, sunshine, space to walk and an opportunity to heal.

In 1914, war broke out, and while construction on the hospital continued, progress slowed. Over the next two years, however, as more and more buildings were completed, doctors transferred psychiatric patients from Toronto facilities.

By February 1917, large numbers of soldiers were returning from overseas. Many were badly wounded and needed intense, long-term treatment. Since general hospitals were not equipped to meet such needs, the Military Hospitals Commission made arrangements to lease patient cottages for the purpose of treating wounded soldiers.

On October 23, 1994, the hospital celebrated 75 years of service to patients, their families and the communities with a rapidly growing primary service area of over 2.2 million people. The public joined in the celebrations held on the hospital grounds. The theme of the event was "A Proud Past, A Progressive Future." On this occasion the facility was renamed Whitby Mental Health Centre.

In 1996, a new, state-of-the-art, $90 million Whitby Mental Health Centre became the first public psychiatric hospital to be built in North America in 25 years. The facility was designed with eight interconnected buildings, separated by accessible landscaped courtyards and linked by a 1,400 foot interior corridor. The use of skylights, windows and glass is extensive, to let in light. Upon completion, the structure's roof was the largest zinc installation anywhere in the world and is not expected to require maintenance for the next 100 years. Eleven large artwork commissions are displayed throughout the facility with the aim to provide beauty and assist with orientation.

In 1997, the Ministry of Health and Long-Term Care recommended the hospital and eight other provincial psychiatric hospitals divest and operate under the Public Hospital Act. In these recommendations, the hospital was slated to become a stand-alone corporation and the other eight hospitals were divested to existing hospital corporations.

On June 10, 2009, the hospital rebranded to better reflect its goals and vision. The new name is Ontario Shores Centre for Mental Health Sciences (Ontario Shores). The Communications and Public Affairs team at Ontario Shores won a Gold Quill Award of Merit in the category of Brand Communication from the International Association of Business Communicators (IABC) for the organization's rebranding project, A New Brand for a New Era.

== Programs and services ==
Ontario Shores offers specialized and comprehensive care for adolescents, adults and seniors living with mental illness. The hospital provides a broad range of inpatient and outpatient programs and services, including community-based programs and initiatives.

== Research ==
Ontario Shores conducts research with various themes, including Adolescent Community Psychiatry Studies, e-Health Studies, Neuropharmacology Studies, Neurospychology Studies, Psychiatric Measurement Studies and Recovery Studies.

The hospital's 2017–2022 Academic Plan outlines four areas of focus: Data Science, Innovative Technologies, Recovery, and Dementia.

On November 9, 2022, Ontario Shores and Ontario Tech University established the Advancement for Dementia Care Centre (ADCC), a research partnership focusing on the development of technologies that improve the quality of life of people with dementia and caregivers. The partnership has produced research such as the possibility of integrating virtual reality reminiscence therapy in dementia patient care. It is also a community-affiliated hospital of the University of Toronto.

== Facilities ==
Ontario Shores' Gordon Street location in Whitby, Ontario is the home of its largest facility. The facility was designed with eight interconnected buildings, separated by accessible landscaped courtyards and linked by a 1,400 foot interior corridor. The use of skylights, windows and glass is extensive, to let in light. Upon completion, the structure's roof was the largest zinc installation anywhere in the world and is not expected to require maintenance for the next 100 years. Eleven large artwork commissions are displayed throughout the facility with the aim provide beauty and assist with orientation.

Ontario Shores also serves outpatients through a number of clinics across Ontario: Durham Community Clinic, Durham Assertive Community Treatment Team, Peterborough Assertive Community Treatment Team, York Region Community Clinic, Maple Memory Clinic and Kawartha Lakes Community Clinic.

== Community and outreach ==
Ontario Shores is a part of the community. The hospital runs a number of community-based programs such as New Directions, in partnership with Durham Mental Health Services and United Survivors Support Centre, to provide specialized, recovery-oriented care to individuals suffering from mental illness in a central community location. This day program runs events three times a week and includes communications, computers, art, cooking and more. The hospital also has a number of partnerships with local businesses such as Tim Hortons, Parkwood Estate and Manufacturing and Technology Centre to provide patients with an opportunity to gain valuable work experience and develop connections with their community.

Ontario Shores regularly presents lectures and conferences, to advance mental health care among professionals and the general public, featuring both clinical experts and personal stories. The hospital also presents a number of arts, music and film events, including Mindful Music, Imagine Film Festival and Film Series, Let's Talk Speaker Series, an art gallery and special guest speakers, such as Chantal Kreviazuk, Matthew Good and Steven Page.
