= Brooklin, Ontario =

Brooklin
- Unincorporated community
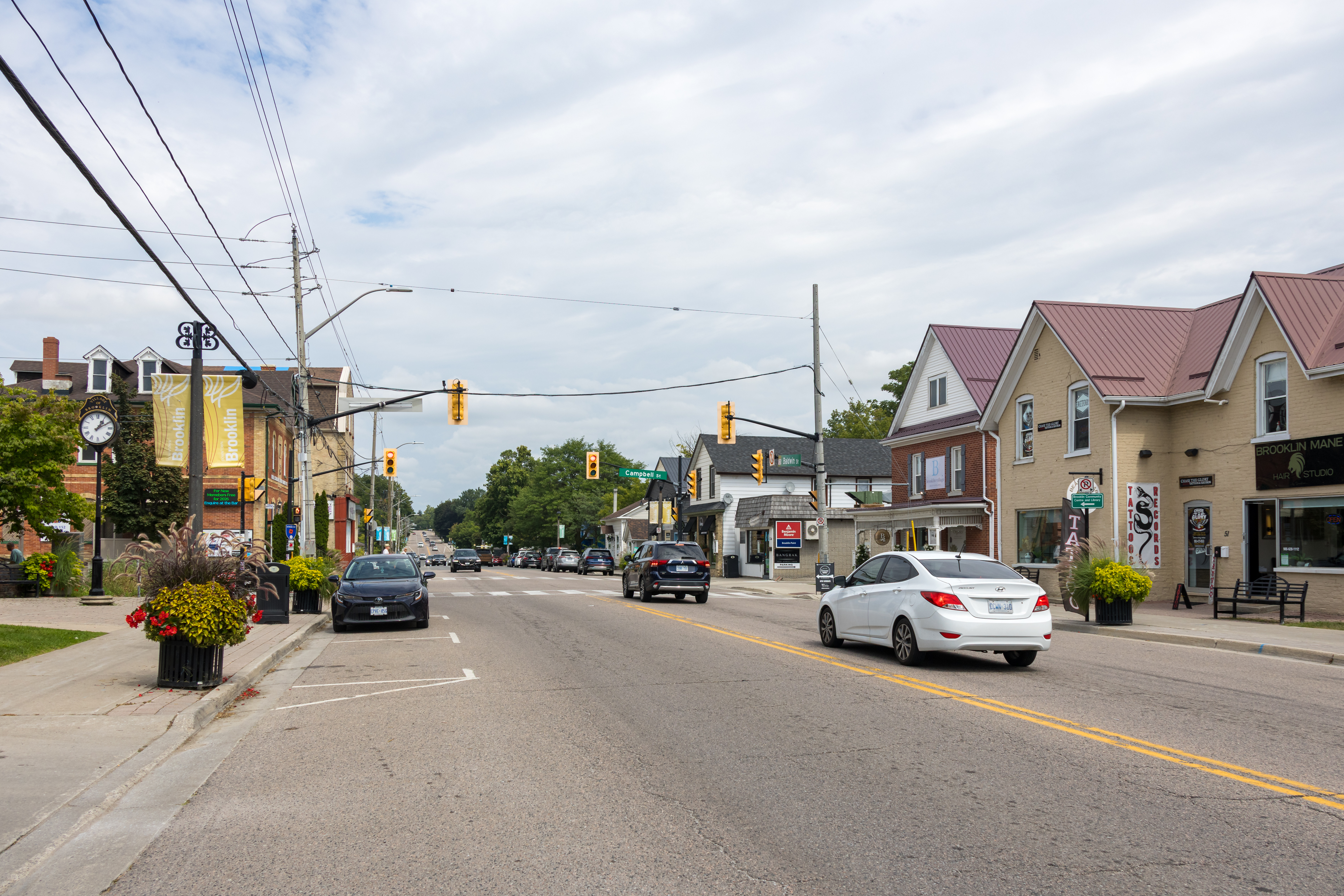
- Baldwin Street in Brooklin

- Location within Southern Ontario
- Coordinates: 43°57′30″N 78°57′35″W
- Country: Canada
- Province: Ontario
- Regional municipality: Durham
- Town: Whitby
- Settled: 1820s
- Elevation: 164 m (538 ft)

Population
  - Total: 25,000
- Time zone: UTC-5 (EST)
  - Summer (DST): UTC-4 (EDT)
- Forward sortation area: L1M
- Area codes: 905 and 289
- NTS Map: 030M15
- GNBC Code: FALWV
- Website: www.whitby.ca/explore-and-enjoy/downtowns-whitby-and-brooklin/

Brooklin is a community in the town of Whitby, Ontario, Canada, north of central Whitby, at the south junction of Ontario Highways 12 and 7. While Brooklin proper is confined to a specific area, people in the surrounding area largely identify their location as "Brooklin" rather than "Whitby".

Brooklin was located primarily in a rural area about two decades ago, but it is urbanising, with high population growth and infrastructure development. Brooklin is surrounded by hills covering the north and the west. The hills and the forests that dominate the north are part of the South Slope of the Oak Ridges Moraine. It is located within the Lynde Creek Watershed which retains 19 to 26% of its forest cover. The population has grown rapidly since the early 1990s with the addition of thousands of homes, predominantly in the subdivisions that surround Brooklin.

== Geography ==
- Population: estimated 30,000 (2018)
- Area: 9 km^{2}
- density: medium (mostly single-family dwellings)
- Location: northern area within The Corporation of the Town of Whitby
- Name of inhabitants: Brooklinite sing., -s pl.

Farmlands dominated and some farms have now become residential areas to the south and east; hills and forests are covered with pine and other types of forests especially oaks and birches covers the west, the north and east with some farming. Macedonian Village is located about 6 km to the southwest, housing about 100 residents. The villages of Ashburn and Myrtle are about 5 km to the north of the village. Highway 407 opened on June 20, 2016 and travels just south of Brooklin along a power line transmission corridor.

== History ==
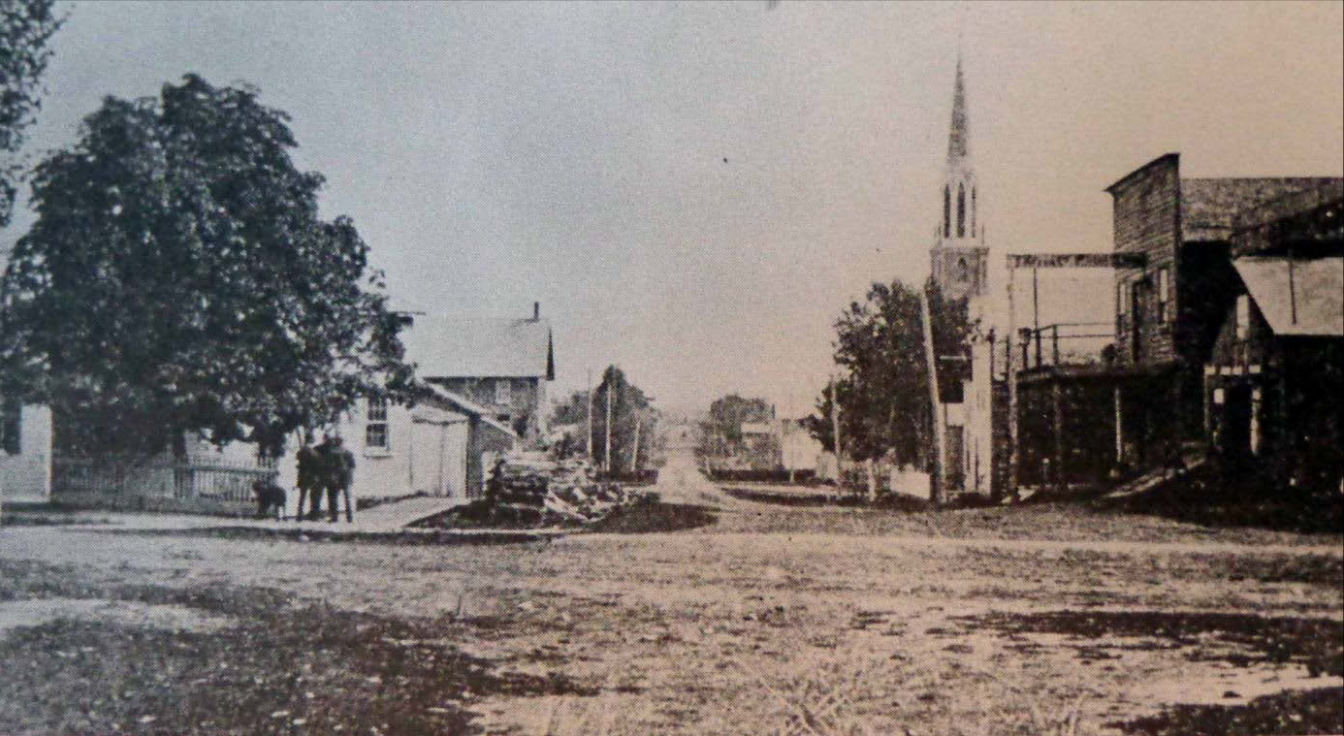
Brooklin (Cassels Road and Baldwin Street), 1878

The area around Brooklin began to be settled in the 1820s. The community itself grew after 1840, when brothers John & Robert Campbell built a flour mill on Lynde Creek. (The present mill building was built in 1848 after a lightning fire destroyed the original.) The village was originally named Winchester, but renamed when the post office was established to avoid duplication with a village named Winchester in eastern Ontario. In 1847, the residents chose to rename the community Brooklin, possibly from Brooklyn, New York or Brooklin, Maine. It could have been named for the "brook" that ran through the town, but this waterway is generally accepted described as a "creek", and naming the village after a community in New England or New York is logical since several prominent early residents migrated from there.

Prominent people from Brooklin include John Dryden (1840–1909), long-serving agriculture minister of the Province of Ontario. While a government minister, Dryden created the northwestern Ontario experimental farm that eventually led to the formation of the town of Dryden.

Housing developments arrived in the late 1950s with the Meadowcrest subdivision, which expanded the village to the west of Baldwin Street. For several decades after this, there was no further major house construction and Meadowcrest was known colloquially as "The Subdivision". Housing activity resumed in the mid-1990s east of the village between Queen Street and Thickson Road with the Village of Brooklin subdivision, and continued into the late-1990s with further developments to the southeast. Housing developments reached Ashburn Road to the west in 2000; the development featured a decorative pond, and the Olde Winchester subdivision was begun east of Thickson in 2001.

Downtown Brooklin was officially designated as a Heritage Conservation District in 2008 under Part V of the Ontario Heritage Act through the Town of Whitby by-laws 6085-08 and 6086-08.

== Economy ==
Aside from the farms that surround the town, Brooklin is largely a bedroom community and many residents commute to other parts of the Greater Toronto Area for employment. The largest employer in Brooklin is FreshCo.

== Sports ==
Lacrosse is a popular sport in the area. At one time, Brooklin was known as being the smallest town to have a Major Series Lacrosse team. In 1968, the Brooklin Redmen MSL team won the esteemed Mann Cup, and the team went on to win the cup again in 1969, 1985, 1987, 1988, 1990 and 2000. Today, the team is now known as the Brooklin Lacrosse Club, and plays its home games in the southern part of Whitby.

Meadowcrest Public School was for a number of years known as a "volleyball school" as it won 4 Provincial Cup awards as well as being the top school in all of Durham for 10 years. Winchester Public School, however, has beat Meadowcrest Public School in both Academic and Sporting Events since its inception in 2000.

Hockey is a popular sport in the area. Three National Hockey League players grew up in Brooklin; Matthew Poitras, Ryan Winterton, and Pete Vipond, as well as Professional Women's Hockey League goaltender Sarah Coe.

== Other ==
Brooklin and area has 8 elementary schools, including Meadowcrest P.S., Winchester P.S., Brooklin Village P.S., Blair Ridge P.S., St. Leo's C.S., St. Bridget C.S., Saint John Paul II C.S., and Chris Hadfield P.S. Five high schools service the community (with four located in Whitby south of the village): Donald A Wilson Secondary School (French immersion), Saint-Charles Garnier C.S. (French-language instruction), All Saints Catholic Secondary School, Anderson Collegiate Vocational Institute (gifted), and Brooklin High School which resides in the village. A post office, library, fire hall, community centre, and ice arena are provided to the citizens by the municipal government. Many church communities provide for their adherents, including St. Thomas' Anglican, Brooklin United, St. Leo's Roman Catholic, Burn's Presbyterian (actually located in Ashburn), Renaissance Baptist, Unitarian Universalist Congregation Of Durham, and Brooklin Village Church. A shopping plaza is the southern gateway to an older established downtown business corridor.

== Subdivisions ==
- Macedonian Village, southwest
- The Bakery, central
- Olde Winchester, east

== In popular culture ==
The Tragically Hip filmed the music video for their famous song "Ahead By a Century" on a farm in Brooklin in 1996. The music video won the Best Video award at the 1996 MuchMusic Video Awards. Additionally, the song later went on to be nominated for a Juno award in 1997, and was certified platinum in 2016.

== Nearest places ==
- Columbus, northeast
- Greenwood, west
- Port Perry, northeast
- Oshawa, southeast
- Whitby, south
- Ashburn, north
- Myrtle, northeast
- Myrtle Station, northeast
- Hampton, east
- Uxbridge, northwest
- Ajax, Ontario, southwest
- Toronto, Ontario, southwest
