= Brooklin High School =

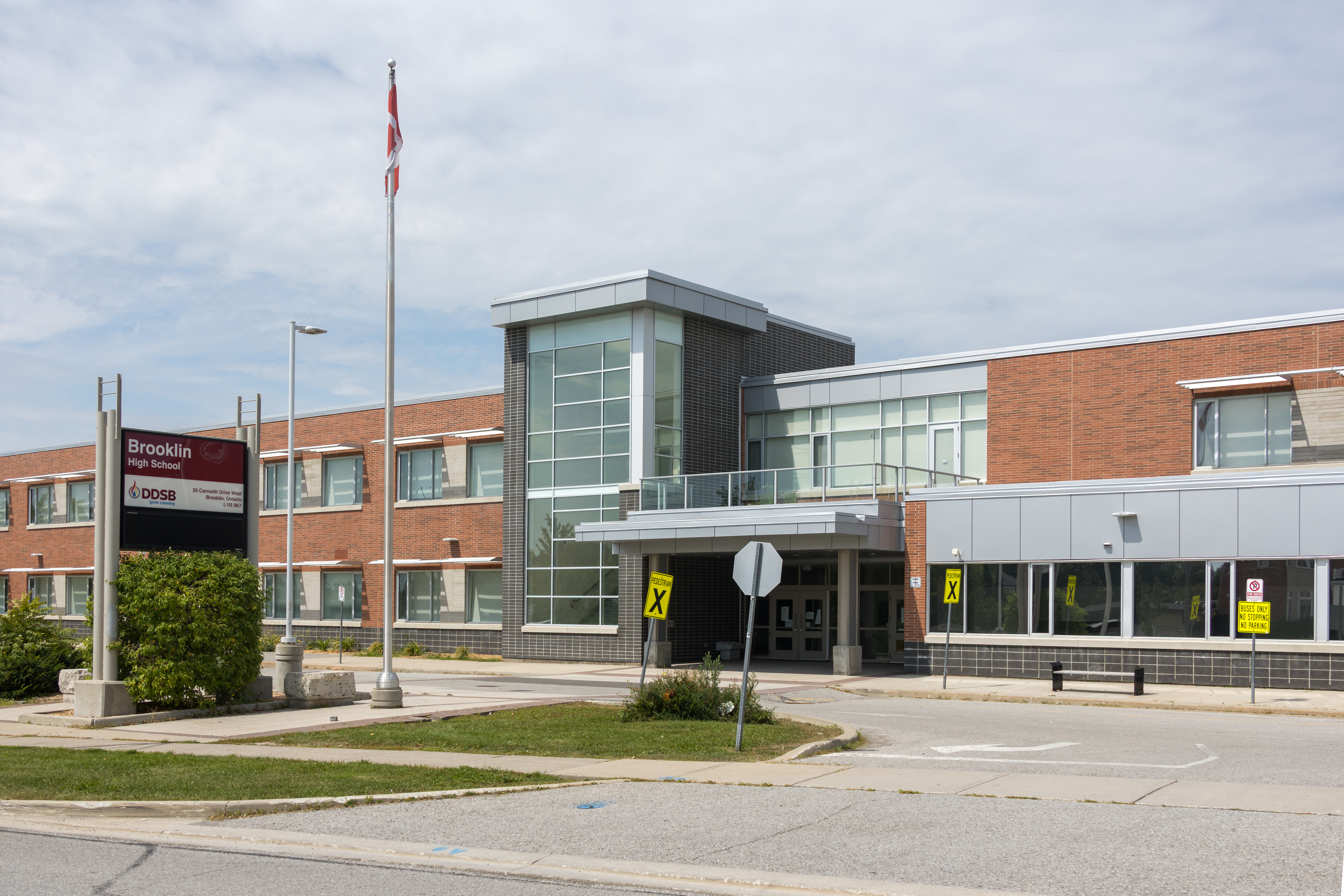

Location
- 20 Carnwith Drive West; Brooklin, Ontario, L1M 0K7; Canada; 43.964°N 78.962°W

Information
- School type: High School
- Founded: 2015
- School board: Durham District School Board
- Superintendent: John Bowyer
- Area trustee: Christine Winters & Kimberly Zeppieri
- Principal: Julie Mackenzie
- Grades: 9-12
- Enrolment: 1400 (2023)
- Language: English
- Colours: Black, Cyan and Silver
- Mascot: Bear
- Feeder schools: Blair Ridge Public School; Brooklin Village Public School; Chris Hadfield Public School; Winchester Public School
- Website: www.ddsb.ca/school/brooklinhs/Pages/default.aspx

Brooklin High School is a high school, including grades 9 to 12, located in Whitby, Ontario, Canada. Part of the Durham District School Board, it opened in September 2015, initially with grades 9 to 11. The school mascot is a bear, and the school colours are black, cyan, and silver.

== Facility ==
The school building consists of two main floors, triple gymnasium with full sports field and running track, a dance studio, a weight room, a cafeteria which is also used as an auditorium ('cafetorium'), a demonstration green roof, and a resource centre which includes numerous computers, and a wide range of books and magazines.

== Extra-curricular activities and athletics ==
Brooklin High School has held a jazz event every year since it opened.

The school offers sports including basketball, rugby, football, volleyball, cross country running, golf, hockey, track and field, curling, swimming, and lacrosse. In 2018 the boys' hockey team took gold and the girls' team bronze at the OFSAA AAA championships.
