= Myrtle Station, Ontario =

Myrtle Station
- Unincorporated community
- Interactive map of Myrtle Station
- Coordinates: 44°00′30″N 78°57′54″W
- Country: Canada
- Province: Ontario
- Regional municipality: Durham
- Town: Whitby
- Time zone: UTC-5 (EST)
  - Summer (DST): UTC-4 (EDT)
- Forward sortation area: L0B 1A0
- Area codes: 905 and 289
- NTS Map: 031D02
- GNBC Code: FDLLA

Myrtle Station is a community in the town of Whitby, Ontario, Canada.

Myrtle Station is located approximately one kilometre north of the community of Myrtle. In 1884, the Canadian Pacific Railway (CPR) built a rail line between Toronto and Montreal through the area. A railway station was constructed and the community that grew in the vicinity was known as Myrtle Station. The community was originally part of Whitby Township and became part of the Town of Whitby when the two municipalities amalgamated in 1968. From 1994 until 2004 Myrtle Station hosted the annual Grasstock music and arts festival.

The CPR line remains, but now ends in Havelock-Belmont-Methuen.
