= Whitby Psychiatric Hospital =

Coordinates: 43.84827°N 78.94565°W

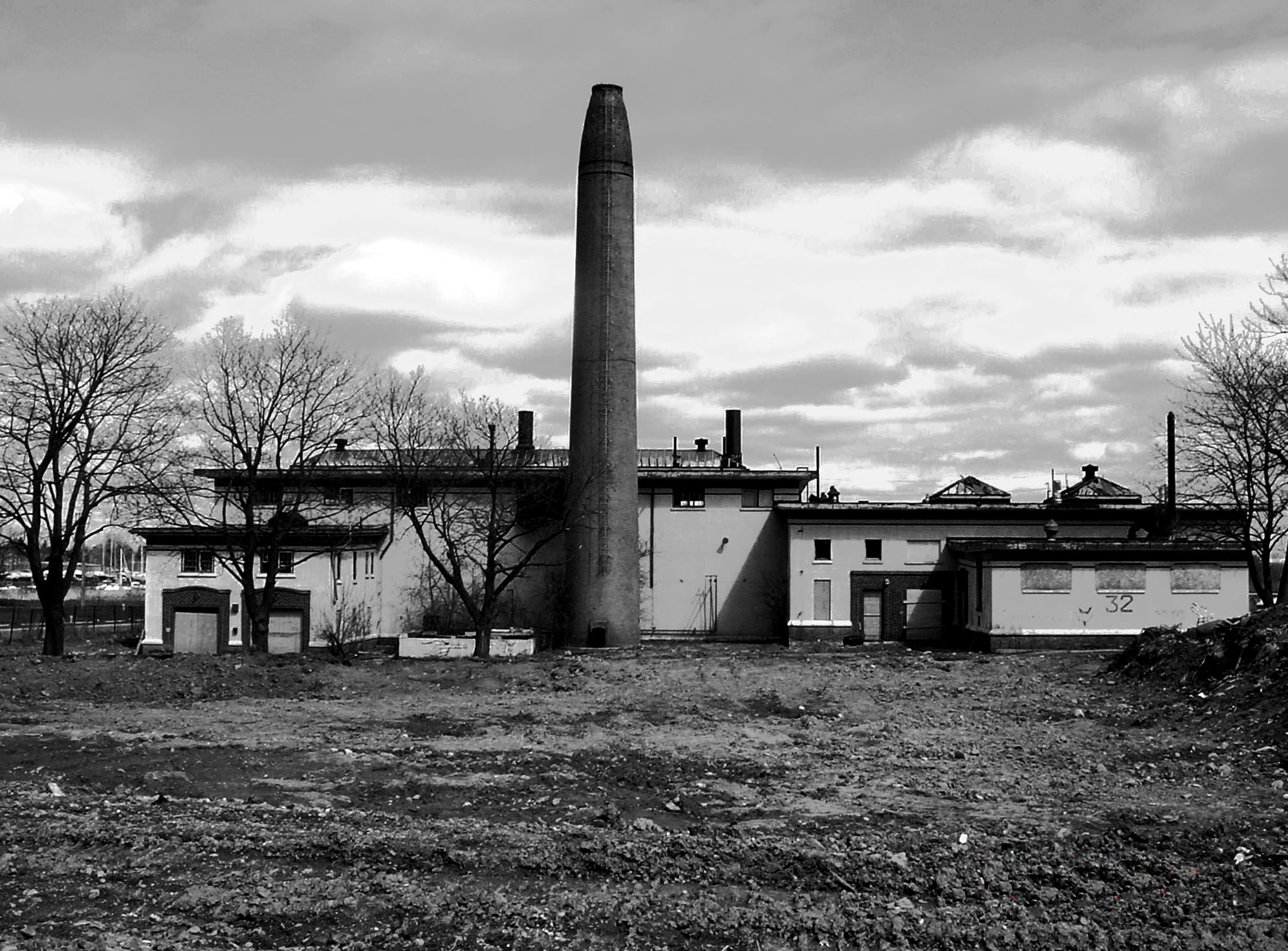
- Building number 32 (Powerhouse) of Psych

Geography
- Location: Whitby, Ontario, Canada

Organization
- Care system: Public Medicare (Canada) (OHIP)
- Type: Specialist

Services
- Emergency department: No
- Speciality: Psychiatric hospital

History
- Founded: 1911
- Closed: 1995

Links
- Lists: Hospitals in Canada

Whitby Psychiatric Hospital, also known as Whitby Psych, Ontario Hospital for the Insane, Ontario Hospital, Whitby, or OHW, was a psychiatric hospital located in Whitby, Ontario. The hospital was replaced by the Whitby Mental Health Centre (now the Ontario Shores Centre for Mental Health Sciences) in 1995, which operates on the same site.

== History ==
In 1911, the Government of Ontario announced that a new asylum would be built to replace a similar facility in Toronto, and a 624-acre (253 ha) site on Lake Ontario in Whitby was selected the following year. Whitby was chosen due its relative proximity to Toronto and for cheap power and water provided by local utilities. Most of the buildings of the new Ontario Hospital for the Insane were constructed from 1913 to 1916. Upon completion, the site was taken over by the Government of Canada to serve as a military convalescent hospital for soldiers wounded in the First World War. The facility was returned to the Ontario government in 1919.

The hospital was considered a model of mental health care for its era. Patients were housed in a cottage setting in an attempt to provide a home-like atmosphere to those undergoing treatment. The lakeside fresh-air environment was also seen as beneficial, as was the attached hospital farm. The farm was intended to make the facility self-sufficient in meat, milk and vegetables. It was operated until 1969.

A nursing school was operated on the site from 1920 to 1972, when the responsibility for nursing training was transferred to Ontario's colleges.

At its peak, the hospital was home to 1,650 patients. However, starting in the 1950s, new advancements in medication, therapy and care enabled a greater degree of community care. In 1968, the name of the facility was changed to the Whitby Psychiatric Hospital. As more patients were discharged into community settings, the number of in-patients dropped from 1,000 to 504 between 1970 and 1977.

Over the years, the presence of the facility also had considerable effect on the Town of Whitby. Its original construction brought many tradespeople to the town, and until the 1960s, it was the largest employer in the municipality.

In 1979, provincial studies indicated that the facility should be rebuilt. Construction on the new hospital began several years later in 1993, and was officially opened as the Whitby Mental Health Centre in 1996.

Many of the old buildings remained on the site until 2005 and 2006 when most were finally torn down. Their condition had deteriorated over the years and they were a popular destination for urban explorers. Over the years, the area immediately adjacent to the hospital site has been developed and local residents complained about unsightly and unsafe buildings.

Canadian alternative rock band Billy Talent shot their music video for Try Honesty in one of the old buildings in 2003, before they were torn down in 2005–6.
