= Myrtle, Ontario =

Myrtle
- Unincorporated community
- Interactive map of Myrtle
- Coordinates: 44°1′5″N 78°58′9″W
- Country: Canada
- Province: Ontario
- Regional municipality: Durham
- Town: Whitby
- Time zone: UTC-5 (EST)
  - Summer (DST): UTC-4 (EDT)
- Forward sortation area: L0B 1A0
- Area codes: 905 and 289
- NTS Map: 031D02
- GNBC Code: FDLLM

Myrtle is a community in the Town of Whitby, Durham Region, Ontario, Canada.

Myrtle, located in what was Whitby Township, was first named Well's Corners. In 1856, the name of the community was changed to Wellwood and again to Myrtle in the 1860s. In 1968, Myrtle became part of the Town of Whitby when the Town amalgamated with Whitby Township.

Myrtle is located approximately 16 kilometres north of the town centre of Whitby and 6 kilometres north of Brooklin along Highway 12.
