= List of Carnegie libraries in Canada =

There are a total of 125 public Carnegie libraries in Canada. Of these, the vast majority (111) were built in Ontario. They were constructed and opened from 1903 to 1922. Place names as they were during the grant period are used. In a few cases, Carnegie made multiple donations. An attempt is made to note these and sum the total amount. In addition, one academic library was built for Victoria University in the University of Toronto by architect Henry Sproatt, from a $50,000 grant awarded April 16, 1906.

== Alphabetical listing ==
Building still operating as a library
Building no longer standing
Building standing, but now serving another purpose

Library name	Place	Province	Date granted	Grant amount (US$)	Date opened	Location	Notes
Amherstburg Public Library	Amherstburg	Ontario	April 8, 1911	10,000	1913	232 Sandwich St. 42°06′11″N 83°06′34″W	by architect Charles Howard Crane
Aylmer Public Library	Aylmer	Ontario	November 21, 1911	8,000	1913	Centre St. and Sydenham St. 42°46′20″N 80°59′04″W	by architect William Austin Mahoney; Closed around 1979.
Ayr Public Library	Ayr	Ontario	December 24, 1909	5,200	October 31, 1911	92 Stanley St. 43°17′09″N 80°27′00″W	by architect William Edward Binning; Closed in 2004; a new library was built nearby.
Barrie Public Library	Barrie	Ontario	July 23, 1914	15,000	June 1917	37 Mulcaster St. 44°23′25″N 79°41′07″W	by architect Alfred Hirschfelder Chapman; Closed in 1996, this building is now the MacLaren Arts Centre.
Beaverton Public Library	Beaverton	Ontario	April 28, 1910	7,000	December 5, 1913	401 Simcoe St. 44°25′45″N 79°09′10″W	by architect William Edward Binning
Berlin Public Library	Berlin	Ontario	March 14, 1902	40,900	January 8, 1904	Queen St. and Weber St. 43°27′07″N 80°29′15″W	by architect Charles Knechtel; Building demolished in 1962.
Bracebridge Public Library	Bracebridge	Ontario	March 24, 1906	10,000	January 1908	94 Manitoba St. 45°02′30″N 79°18′43″W	by architect George Martel Miller
Brampton Public Library	Brampton	Ontario	April 11, 1902	12,500	1907	55 Queen St. E 43°41′14″N 79°45′31″W	by architect Alexander Frank Wickson; Closed in 1974; designated as a heritage building in 1982.
Brantford Public Library	Brantford	Ontario	April 11, 1902	48,000	July 4, 1904	73 George St. 43°08′27″N 80°15′45″W	by architects Stewart, Stewart & Taylor; Closed in the 1990s, now home to the Brantford campus of Wilfrid Laurier University.
Brockville Public Library	Brockville	Ontario	April 13, 1903	17,500	August 13, 1904	23 Buell St. 44°35′22″N 75°41′12″W	by architect Benjamin Dillon
Brussels Public Library	Brussels	Ontario	March 13, 1909	7,000	January 14, 1910	402 Turnberry St. 43°44′36″N 81°15′02″W	by architect William J Ireland
Calgary Public Library	Calgary	Alberta		80,000	January 2, 1912	1221 2nd St. SW; 51°02′26″N 114°04′06″W	Known as Memorial Park Library since 1977.
Campbellford Public Library	Campbellford	Ontario	January 6, 1911	8,000	November 1912	98 Bridge St. E 44°18′29″N 77°47′42″W	by architect William Austin Mahoney
Chatham Public Library	Chatham	Ontario	February 13, 1902	19,000	September 14, 1903		by architect T.J. Wilson; The first Carnegie library opened in Canada. Destroyed by 1983.
Clinton Public Library	Clinton	Ontario	January 6, 1915	4,900	1905	23 Albert St. 43°37′05″N 81°32′22″W	Addition by architect J. Ades Fowler; The Clinton library is the only Carnegie library in Canada which was funded as an addition to an existing building, which was built in 1900.
Collingwood Public Library	Collingwood	Ontario	August 16, 1901	14,500	1904	Maple St. and Second St. 44°30′02″N 80°13′12″W	by architect William Stewart; Destroyed by fire in 1963.
Cornwall Public Library	Cornwall	Ontario	December 21, 1901	8,000	1904	Second St. and Sydney St. 45°01′08″N 74°43′36″W	Demolished in 1956.
Dawson City Public Library	Dawson City	Yukon	1902	25,000	August 16, 1904	Queen St. and 4th Ave. 64°03′38″N 139°25′50″W	By architect Robert Moncrieff; By 1920, the population was too small to support the library, which had been extensively damaged by fire and water. This was the northernmost Carnegie library ever built. It has been a Freemason hall since the 1930s.
Dresden Public Library	Dresden	Ontario	November 27, 1906	8,000	1913	187 Brown St. 42°35′24″N 82°10′50″W	* by architect Arthur M Piper This is the only remaining Carnegie building in the Municipality of Chatham-Kent still operating as a library. It was built in 1913 with a donation of $8,000 received from Andrew Carnegie in 1906. In the 1980s the building was designated an historic site under the Ontario Heritage Act. It remained unchanged for many years until after the amalgamation of the County of Kent and City of Chatham. In 2000, the townspeople of Dresden celebrated the grand opening of the refurbished library.
Dundas Public Library	Dundas	Ontario	December 30, 1904	12,000	1910	10 King St. W 43°15′58″N 79°57′17″W	by architect Alfred Hirschfelder Chapman; Closed in 1979, this building is now home to the Dundas Art & Craft Organization.
Durham Public Library	Durham	Ontario	January 6, 1911	8,000	July 1912	240 Garafraxa St. N 44°10′49″N 80°49′10″W	by architect William Austin Mahoney
Edmonton Public Library	Edmonton	Alberta	1913	75,000	August 30, 1923	MacDonald Dr. west of 100th St. 53°32′25″N 113°29′27″W	The building was demolished in 1969; AGT Tower was erected on the former library's site.
Elmira Public Library	Elmira	Ontario	March 18, 1911	7,000	December 26, 1913	65 Arthur St. S 43°35′49″N 80°33′31″W	by architect William Austin Mahoney
Elora Public Library	Elora	Ontario	March 23, 1909	6,400	1909	144 Geddes St. 43°41′02″N 80°25′51″W	by architect W.F. Sheppard
Essex Public Library	Essex	Ontario	January 6, 1911	6,000		18 Gordon Ave. 42°10′29″N 82°49′15″W	by architect James Carlisle Pennington; Now home to the Essex and Community Historical Research Society.
Exeter Public Library	Exeter	Ontario	January 2, 1913	8,000	1915	Main St. and Sanders St. 43°20′50″N 81°28′50″W	by architect William Austin Mahoney; A newer library was built in 2002.
Fergus Public Library	Fergus	Ontario	January 29, 1908	7,000	1910	190 Saint Andrew St. W 43°42′18″N 80°22′43″W	by architect William Austin Mahoney
Forest Public Library	Forest	Ontario	May 16, 1911	5,000	1912		by architect William Austin Mahoney. Closed in 1986.
Fort Frances Public Library	Fort Frances	Ontario	May 8, 1914	10,000	January 15, 1915	363 Church St. 48°36′32″N 93°23′37″W	by architect William Austin Mahoney
Fort William (Thunder Bay) Public Library	Fort William	Ontario	November 20, 1908	50,000	1912	216 Brodie St. S 48°22′54″N 89°14′48″W	by architects Hood & Scott
Galt (Cambridge) Public Library	Cambridge	Ontario	April 11, 1902	23,000	1903	34 Water St. N 43°21′37″N 80°18′55″W	by architect Frederick William Mellish; Closed in 1969 and now owned by a private company.
Glencoe Public Library	Glencoe	Ontario	November 11, 1914	5,000	February 1, 1923	Main St. 42°44′51″N 81°42′37″W	Closed in 1993.
Goderich Public Library	Goderich	Ontario	March 14, 1902	10,000	March 3, 1905	52 Montreal St. 43°44′29″N 81°42′49″W	by architect Joseph Ades Fowler
Grand Valley Public Library	Grand Valley	Ontario	February 13, 1909	7,500	May 1, 1913	4 Amaranth St. E 43°53′58″N 80°18′49″W	by architect George Gray; This building was completely destroyed by a tornado in 1985. A new library was subsequently built in its place.
Gravenhurst Public Library	Gravenhurst	Ontario	March 24, 1906	7,000	1923	275 Muskoka Rd. S 44°55′06″N 79°22′24″W	by architect Andrew Ferguson; Closed in 2000, this building is now the Terence Haight Carnegie Centre (Gravenhurst Chamber of Commerce)
Grimsby Public Library	Grimsby	Ontario	January 6, 1911	8,000	1912	25 Adelaide St. 43°11′40″N 79°33′34″W	by architect Arthur Edwin Nicholson; Now used as the Grimsby Archives.
Guelph Public Library	Guelph	Ontario	October 17, 1901	14,500	1904	100 Norfolk St. 43°32′44″N 80°15′09″W	by architect William Frye Colwill; Demolished in 1964 for new library.
Hamilton Public Library	Hamilton	Ontario	March 23, 1909	100,000	May 5, 1913	55 Main St. W 43°15′21″N 79°52′18″W	by architect Alfred W. Peene; After closing in 1980, this building is now the Unified Family Court.
Hanover Public Library	Hanover	Ontario	May 15, 1906	10,000	October 3, 1911	451 10th Ave. 44°09′06″N 81°01′35″W	by architect William Edward Binning
Harriston Public Library	Harriston	Ontario	May 8, 1908	10,000		88 Mill St. 43°54′42″N 80°52′06″W	by architect William Edward Binning
Hespeler Public Library	Hespeler	Ontario	January 18, 1910	14,280	1923	5 Tannery St. E 43°25′51″N 80°18′34″W	by architect A.H. Cober
Ingersoll Public Library	Ingersoll	Ontario	June 29, 1908	10,000	July 1, 1910	1 Charles St E	by architect Thomas Warren Nagle; Currently used as a wedding hall
Kemptville Public Library	Kemptville	Ontario	April 23, 1906	3,000	1912	207 Prescott St. 45°00′54″N 75°38′41″W	by architect A. Stuart Allaster; Closed in 2010, now in private hands
Kenora Public Library	Kenora	Ontario	May 21, 1913	15,000	1916	24 Main St. S 49°46′06″N 94°29′23″W	by architect John Manuel
Kincardine Public Library	Kincardine	Ontario	April 10, 1906	5,000	1908	727 Queen St. 44°10′33″N 81°38′11″W	by architect J.W. Drake
Kingsville Public Library	Kingsville	Ontario	March 29, 1911	5,000	1913	28 Division St. S 42°02′13″N 82°44′23″W	by architect William Austin Mahoney
Leamington Public Library	Leamington	Ontario	March 21, 1910	10,000	1912	northwest corner of Erie Street North and John Street	by architect John Alexander Maycock
Lethbridge Public Library	Lethbridge	Alberta		25,000	January 24, 1922	601 – 3rd Ave. S 49°41′45″N 112°50′19″W	The library closed in 1974 but is now home to the Southern Alberta Art Gallery.
Lindsay Public Library	Lindsay	Ontario	January 23, 1902	13,500	June 28, 1904	190 Kent St. W 44°21′15″N 78°44′25″W	by architect George Martel Miller
Listowel Public Library	Listowel	Ontario	November 25, 1903	10,000	1907	260 Main St. W 43°43′56″N 80°57′18″W	by architect William Edward Binning
Lucknow Public Library	Lucknow	Ontario	April 20, 1905	7,500	April 6, 1910	526 Campbell St. 43°57′30″N 81°30′30″W	by architect Beaumont Jarvis
Markdale Public Library	Markdale	Ontario	August 1914	7,000	June 24, 1915	21 Main St. E. 44°19′08″N 80°38′51″W	by architect Julian Charles Forster; Closed in 2001; now the Daniel Pust Law firm; a new library was built nearby and renamed The Walter Harris Memorial Library
Merritton Public Library	Merritton	Ontario	March 31, 1916	8,500	1924	344 Merritt St. 43°08′25″N 79°12′49″W	by architect Arthur Edwin Nicholson; Closed; now the Chestnut Woods School of Montessori Education.
Midland Public Library	Midland	Ontario	March 21, 1910	12,500	1915	526 Hugel Ave. 44°44′59″N 79°53′10″W	by architect William Austin Mahoney; Now the Olde Town Library - Home Decor/Antiques/Vintage and Cafe
Milverton Public Library	Milverton	Ontario	December 24, 1908	7,000	June 10, 1910	27 Main St. S 43°33′52″N 80°55′24″W	by architect J.A. Russell; Library moved to new location due to accessibility laws.
Mimico Public Library	Mimico, Toronto	Ontario	February 26, 1914	7,500	March 2, 1915	47 Station Rd. 43°36′53″N 79°29′38″W	by architect Stephen Burwell Coon; Demolished in 1966 and replaced with Mimico Centennial Library
Mitchell Public Library	Mitchell	Ontario	March 21, 1908	6,000		105 Saint Andrew St. 43°27′59″N 81°11′48″W	by architect William Edward Binning
Mount Forest Public Library	Mount Forest	Ontario	April 10, 1909	6,000	December 1913	118 Main St. N 43°58′59″N 80°44′14″W	by architect George Gray
New Hamburg Public Library	New Hamburg	Ontario	April 30, 1912	8,000	1915	145 Huron St. 43°22′42″N 80°42′45″W	by architect James A. Russell
New Liskeard Public Library	New Liskeard	Ontario	April 16, 1910	10,900		50 Whitewood Ave. 47°30′30″N 79°40′20″W	by architect Henry Westlake Angus, Known since 2004 as Temiskaming Shores Public Library - New Liskeard Branch
New Westminster Public Library	New Westminster	British Columbia	1902	15,000	1905	Carnarvon St and Mackenzie St. 49°12′13″N 122°54′36″W	This library closed in 1958, when a new library opened on the same site.
Niagara Falls Public Library	Niagara Falls	Ontario	December 8, 1905	15,000	1910	5017 Victoria Ave. 43°06′06″N 79°04′23″W	by architect Charles Martin Borter; Closed in 1974. Occupied today by the Community Resource Centre.
North Battleford Public Library	North Battleford	Saskatchewan	1913	15,000	1916	1 Railway Ave. E 52°46′21″N 108°17′57″W	Now the Allen Sapp Gallery.
North Bay Public Library	North Bay	Ontario	April 25, 1911	16,395	1914	200 McIntyre St E	by architect Henry Westlake Angus; Demolished in 1972
Norwich Public Library	Norwich	Ontario	May 8, 1915	7,000	1915	21 Stover St. N 42°59′21″N 80°35′53″W	by architect Edward Pollock; Now home to private businesses.
Norwood Public Library	Norwood	Ontario	June 11, 1914	5,000	Feb 1924	2363 County Road 45	
Orangeville Public Library	Orangeville	Ontario	June 2, 1904	12,500	1908	144 Broadway; 43°55′10″N 80°05′46″W	by architect Beaumont Jarvis
Orillia Public Library	Orillia	Ontario	April 10, 1909	13,500	1911	36 Mississaga St. W. 44°36′28″N 79°25′15″W	by architect William Henry Croker; Closed in 2012
Oshawa Public Library	Oshawa	Ontario	November 24, 1906	14,000	1909	Athol St. and Simcoe St. 43°53′48″N 78°51′47″W	by architect John Merven Carrerre; Sold and demolished in 1956.
Ottawa Public Library — Main Branch	Ottawa	Ontario	November 6, 1901	100,000	April 30, 1906	120 Metcalfe St. 45°25′13″N 75°41′43″W	by architect E.L. Horwood; Demolished in the fall of 1971; a new library was built at the same location.
Ottawa Public Library — Rosemount Branch	Ottawa	Ontario	March 31, 1917	15,000	November 29, 1919	18 Rosemount Ave. 45°24′06″N 75°43′34″W	Last Carnegie grant given in Canada. It is the oldest Ottawa Public Library branch that hasn't been rebuilt, although it was renovated between 2019-2021.
Owen Sound & North Grey Union Public Library	Owen Sound	Ontario	June 2, 1904	25,000	February 3, 1914	824 1st Ave. W 44°33′50″N 80°56′42″W	by architect Julian Charles Forster
Palmerston Public Library	Palmerston	Ontario	February 4, 1902	10,000	1903	265 Bell St. 43°49′59″N 80°50′57″W	by architect William Frye Colwill; It has been speculated that the Carnegie Foundation would never have granted Palmerston its funding had it known the building would be used for several non-library purposes.
Paris Public Library	Paris	Ontario	January 2, 1903	10,000	July 27, 1904	12 William St. 43°11′37″N 80°23′09″W	by architect Alexander Frank Wickson
Parkhill Public Library	Parkhill	Ontario	January 14, 1914	8,000	July 28, 1915	233 Main St. 43°09′45″N 81°41′03″W	By architect William Austin Mahoney.; The building has operated as an art gallery since 2014.
Pembroke Public Library	Pembroke	Ontario	December 24, 1907	14,000	1912	237 Victoria St. 45°49′31″N 77°06′47″W	Notably designed by Francis Conroy Sullivan, a Canadian pupil of Frank Lloyd Wright
Penetanguishene Public Library	Penetanguishene	Ontario	December 13, 1907	13,000	1910	24 Simcoe St. 44°46′12″N 79°55′56″W	by architect Charles P. Baird.
Perth Public Library	Perth	Ontario	February 13, 1906	10,000		77 Gore St. E 44°53′57″N 76°14′55″W	by architect George Thomas Martin; After a 1980 fire, this corner building was restored and is now known as the McMillan Building.
Peterborough Public Library	Peterborough	Ontario	March 21, 1908	30,000	1911	519 George St N 44°18′34″N 78°19′13″W	by architect John E Belcher; Now known as the Carnegie Wing of Peterborough City Hall.
Picton Public Library	Picton	Ontario	February 13, 1906	12,500	December 14, 1907	208 Main St. 44°00′26″N 77°08′30″W	by architect Frank Peden,
Port Elgin Public Library	Port Elgin	Ontario	March 9, 1907	8,800	October 1908	708 Goderich St. 44°26′19″N 81°23′14″W	by architect S.G. Kingsey
Port Hope Public Library	Port Hope	Ontario	January 6, 1911	10,000	1913	31 Queen St. 43°56′58″N 78°17′35″W	by architect William Austin Mahoney
Preston Public Library	Preston	Ontario	February 13, 1909	12,000	1910	156 Argyle St. N 43°23′50″N 80°21′33″W	by architect William Edward Binning; This building was closed in 1973 when Preston, Galt, and Hespeler merged to form Cambridge library system.
Regina Public Library	Regina	Saskatchewan	1910	50,000	May 11, 1912	1900 Lorne St. 50°26′56″N 104°36′49″W	Demolished and replaced in 1962.
Renfrew Public Library	Renfrew	Ontario	March 16, 1915	16,000		13 Railway Ave. 45°28′22″N 76°41′04″W	by architects Joseph A. Humphris & Richard Hubert Millson
Saint John Public Library	Saint John	New Brunswick		50,000	1904	20 Hazen Ave. 45°16′31″N 66°03′47″W	Closed in 1983, this building is now home to the Saint John Arts Centre.
Sarnia Public Library	Sarnia	Ontario	January 10, 1902	20,000	November 26, 1903		by architect M.R. Burrowes; Demolished in 1960.
Sault Ste. Marie Public Library	Sault Ste. Marie	Ontario	December 14, 1901; 1907	10,000; 15,500	1903; 1909	Queen St. and East St. 46°30′28″N 84°19′40″W	First building by architect H, Russell Halton; Second building by architect Edward Demar; The first library was destroyed by fire in 1907. Carnegie reluctantly donated for a second library in 1909.
Seaforth Public Library	Seaforth	Ontario	July 20, 1908	10,000	April 1912	108 Main St. S 43°33′11″N 81°23′36″W	by architect John Finlayson; Carnegie's secretary, James Bertram, who not only organized but decided upon many new library grants himself, is buried outside Seaforth with his wife (a Seaforth native).
Selkirk Public Library	Selkirk	Manitoba	1908	10,000	June 1909	Eaton Ave. and Eveline St. 50°08′33″N 96°52′12″W	Designed by architect William Fingland; Built by contractor H. Bird; The building was declared structurally unsafe in 1959 and later demolished.
Shelburne Public Library	Shelburne	Ontario	January 21, 1911	6,000	1912	201 Owen Sound St. 44°04′46″N 80°12′18″W	by architect J.A. McKennzie
Simcoe Public Library	Simcoe	Ontario	January 31, 1910	10,000	1912	23 Argyle St. 42°50′15″N 80°18′11″W	by architect Ralph K. Shepard; Closed in 1984; now occupied by a law firm.
Smiths Falls Public Library	Smiths Falls	Ontario	January 23, 1902	11,000	February 25, 1904	81 Beckwith St. N 44°54′10″N 76°01′17″W	by architect G.M. Bayley; First library in Canada visited by Andrew Carnegie (April 28, 1906).
St. Catharines Public Library	St. Catharines	Ontario	December 31, 1901	25,000	January 2, 1905	59 Church St. 43°09′33″N 79°14′46″W	by architect Sydney R. Badgley; Building demolished in 1977, replaced by Ontario Court of Justice building
St. Marys Public Library	St. Marys	Ontario	March 8, 1904	10,000	July 1905	15 Church St. N 43°15′37″N 81°08′27″W	by architect Joseph A. Humphris
St. Thomas Public Library	St. Thomas	Ontario	March 20, 1903	27,000	February 6, 1906	9 Mondamin St. 42°46′46″N 81°11′35″W	by architect Neil R. Darrach; Closed in the early 1970s, this building now hosts the St. Thomas Planning Office.
Stirling Public Library	Stirling	Ontario	April 13, 1914	5,000		43 W Front St. 44°17′36″N 77°33′34″W	by architect William Austin Mahoney
Stouffville Public Library	Stouffville	Ontario	April 28, 1913	5,000	1923	7 Main St. E 43°58′30″N 79°13′52″W	by architect Frederick Frank Saunders; Closed in 1974 as the library moved to a larger building.
Stratford Public Library	Stratford	Ontario	December 14, 1901	15,000	September 19, 1903	19 Andrew St. 43°22′16″N 80°59′09″W	by architect James A. Russell
Tavistock Public Library	Tavistock	Ontario	April 13, 1914	7,500	1917	31 Maria St. 43°19′08″N 80°50′07″W	by architect James A. Russell
Teeswater Public Library	Teeswater	Ontario	April 8, 1907	10,000	1914?	2 Clinton St. S 43°59′53″N 81°17′12″W	by architect William Edward Binning
Thorold Public Library	Thorold	Ontario	April 26, 1902	10,000	April 1912	1 Ormond St. S 43°07′30″N 79°11′56″W	by architect Arthur Edwin Nicholson; Heritage designation, now used as office space.
Tillsonburg Public Library	Tillsonburg	Ontario	January 2, 1913	10,000	1915	Broadway St. and Washington Grande Ave. 42°51′44″N 80°43′46″W	by architect William Austin Mahoney; Replaced in 1974 by a newer library on the same site.
Toronto Public Library — Beaches Branch	Toronto	Ontario	August 8, 1908	15,000	December 6, 1916	2161 Queen St. E 43°40′13″N 79°17′53″W	by architect Eden Smith
Toronto Public Library — Central Reference Branch	Toronto	Ontario	January 23, 1903	275,000	September 8, 1909	214 College St. 43°39′31″N 79°23′47″W	by architect Alexander Frank Wickson, Closed in 1977, this building is now the Koffler Student Centre at the University of Toronto.
Toronto Public Library — High Park Branch	Toronto	Ontario	August 8, 1908	15,000	April 15, 1915	228 Roncesvalles Ave. 43°38′41″N 79°26′54″W	by architect Eden Smith
Toronto Public Library — Queen & Lisgar Branch	Toronto	Ontario	January 23, 1903	25,000	April 30, 1909	1115 Queen St. W 43°38′36″N 79°25′24″W	It served the community until 1964, when it was replaced by a new Parkdale Library. The building housed the offices of the Parkdale Branch of Toronto Public Health until September 2012. A $6.2 million renovation transformed the building into a 21st-century live arts hub and incubator and the permanent home of The Theatre Centre (http://www.theatrecentre.org). The renovation started in 2012.
Toronto Public Library — Riverdale Branch	Toronto	Ontario	January 23, 1903	25,000	October 19, 1910	370 Broadview Ave. 43°39′57″N 79°21′10″W	
Toronto Public Library — Wychwood Branch	Toronto	Ontario	August 8, 1908	20,000	October 31, 1916	1431 Bathurst St. 43°40′55″N 79°25′04″W	by architect Eden Smith
Toronto Public Library — Yorkville Branch	Toronto	Ontario	January 23, 1903	25,000	June 13, 1907	22 Yorkville Ave. 43°40′19″N 79°23′19″W	
Toronto Junction Public Library	Toronto Junction	Ontario	April 6, 1908	20,000	September 1, 1909	145 Annette St. 43°39′49″N 79°27′58″W	by architect James Augustus Ellis; Renamed Annette St. Branch in 1962.
Vancouver Public Library	Vancouver	British Columbia	March 25, 1901	50,000	October 1, 1903	401 Main St. 49°16′52″N 123°06′00″W	by architect George William Grant; Closed in 1957. Since 1980, it has been the Carnegie Community Centre, but there is still a branch library operating on the first floor.
Victoria Public Library	Victoria	British Columbia			1905	794 Yates St. 48°25′34″N 123°21′44″W	by architects Thomas Hooper and C. Elwood Watkins.; Sold in 1980s to Westcoast Savings Credit Union and currently used as office space rented to commercial and institutional tenants.
Walkerton Public Library	Walkerton	Ontario	March 29, 1911	10,000		253 Durham St. E 44°08′00″N 81°08′57″W	by architect George Gray
Wallaceburg Public Library	Wallaceburg	Ontario	March 24, 1906	11,500	December 12, 1907		by architect Arthur M Piper
Waterloo Public Library	Waterloo	Ontario	July 18, 1902	10,000	November 1, 1905	40 Albert St. 43°28′01″N 80°31′29″W	by architect Charles John Moogk; Now the headquarters of Habitat for Humanity Canada.
Watford Public Library	Watford	Ontario	May 17, 1912	6,000		5317 Nauvoo Rd. 42°57′00″N 81°52′48″W	by architect William Austin Mahoney
Welland Public Library	Welland	Ontario	December 8, 1913	25,000	1923	140 King St. 42°59′22″N 79°15′04″W	by architect Norman A. Kearns; Now the Welland Museum.
Weston Public Library	Weston, Toronto	Ontario	January 2, 1913	10,000	December 29, 1914	2 King St. 43°42′05″N 79°31′14″W	by architects Lindsay & Brydon; Now part of Toronto Public Library system.
Whitby Public Library	Whitby	Ontario	April 8, 1911	10,000	1914	132 Dundas St. W 43°52′46″N 78°56′36″W	by architect William Austin Mahoney; Closed in 1973, this building is now used as a law office.
Winnipeg Public Library — William Avenue	Winnipeg	Manitoba	1904	75,000	October 11, 1905	380 William Ave. 49°54′03″N 97°08′41″W	Designed by architect Samuel Hooper (1851-1911), it was built by the construction firm of Smith and Sharp.; Closed in 1994 and now home to the City of Winnipeg Archives.
Winnipeg Public Library — Cornish Branch	Winnipeg	Manitoba	1914	30,000		20 West Gate; 49°52′41″N 97°09′32″W	Designed by architect Samuel Frank Peters (1847-1926), it was built by the National Construction Company.; The grant was jointly awarded for this branch and the Winnipeg — St. John's Branch.
Winnipeg Public Library — St. John's Branch	Winnipeg	Manitoba	1914	28,800		500 Salter St. 49°55′31″N 97°07′59″W	Designed by architect John Nelson Semmens (1879-1960), it was built by construction firm of Fraser and MacDonald.; The grant was jointly awarded for this branch and the Winnipeg — Cornish Branch.
Windsor Public Library	Windsor	Ontario	February 13, 1901	27,000	October 16, 1903	Park St. and Victoria St. 42°18′57″N 83°02′25″W	by architects John Scott & Co.; First Carnegie library granted in Canada.
Woodstock Public Library	Woodstock	Ontario	July 6, 1905	24,000	1909	449 Hunter St. 43°07′52″N 80°45′45″W	by architect William Craven Vaux Chadwick
