= Niagara-on-the-Lake Public Library =

Coordinates: 43.2476°N 79.0864°W

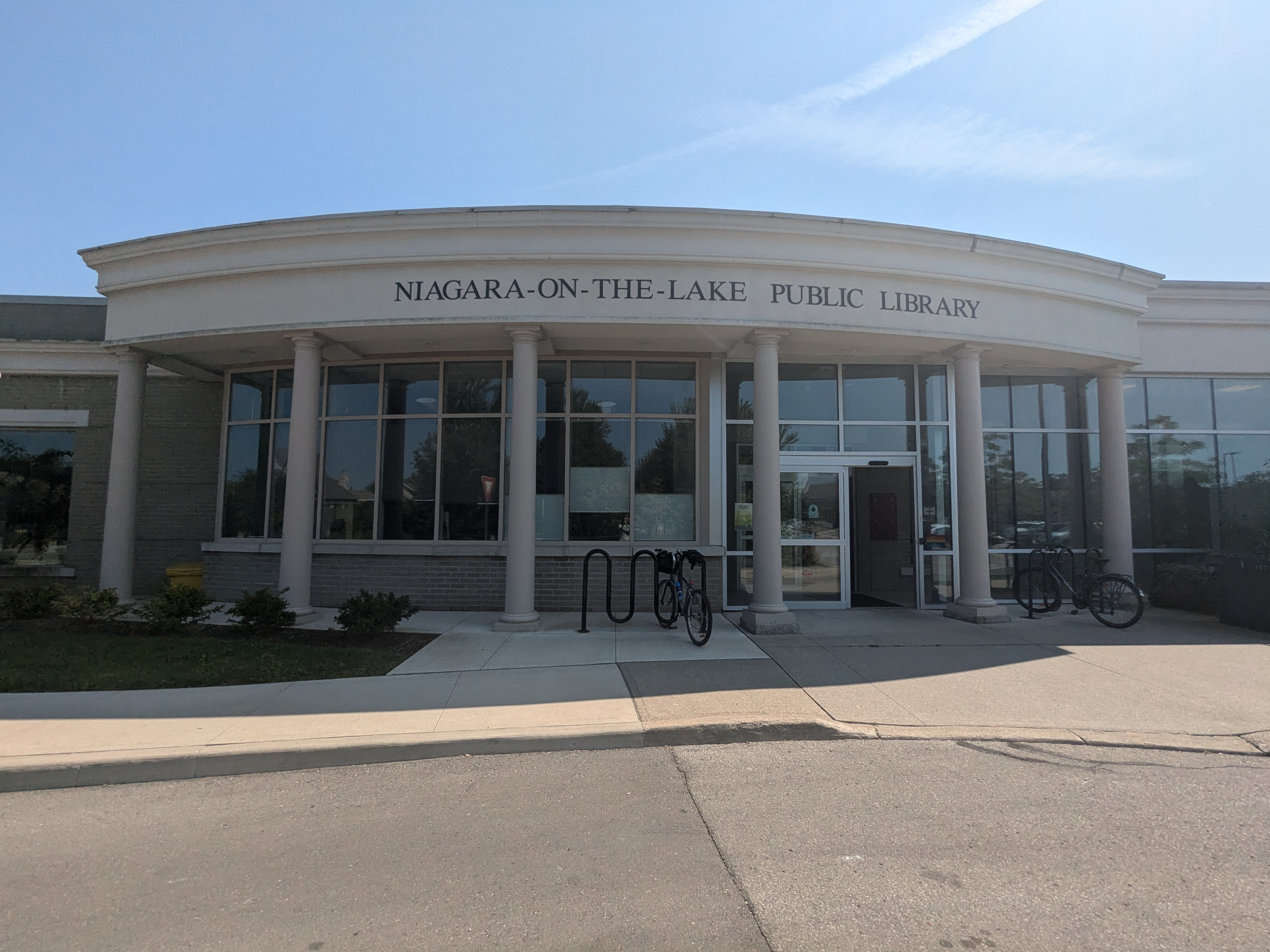
The library in 2024

The Niagara-on-the-Lake Public Library is a library in Niagara on the Lake, Ontario, Canada. It offers various resources and programs. The library received press coverage for firing its chief librarian in 2024.

== History ==
The library originally opened in 1855, relocated multiple times, and transitioned to its current location in 2000. A chief librarian was hired in 1969 and she worked there until her retirement in 2004. She expanded the library's access to new technology and weeded the collection to exclude outdated materials such as travel guides from the early 1900s. The library digitized materials she had preserved regarding the history of the institution. After her death in 2022, a tree was planted in honour of her contributions to the library.

The library offers books, digital resources, and jigsaw puzzles. There are multiple books in its black history collection. Several children's programs are offered. In 2014, the library offered a program where patrons could pay an additional fee and rent kitchen equipment throughout the year. In 2017, a labyrinth outside the building was established. In February 2024, the library considered amalgamation with other libraries in the Niagara Region. It has a borrowing arrangement with Welland and Niagara Falls but remains an independent institution.

In March 2024, the chief librarian was criticized for writing a newspaper column that supported the Foundation Against Intolerance and Racism, a group known for right wing political advocacy and Anti-LGBT rhetoric. The employee believed in library neutrality and objected to the removal of content that "incite[s] hatred or violence" on censorship grounds. She was fired shortly afterwards. An online petition to protest her termination was launched and received 714 signatures. The organization she supported also objected to her firing. The library board stated that their issue was not with the piece itself but from her signing it as CEO and misrepresenting the board's position.

== See also ==
- Niagara Falls Public Library (Ontario)
- St. Catharines Public Library
- Thorold Public Library
- List of public libraries in Ontario
