= MacBain Community Centre =

Recreation facility in Niagara Falls, Ontario

Coordinates: 43.0714°N 79.1243°W

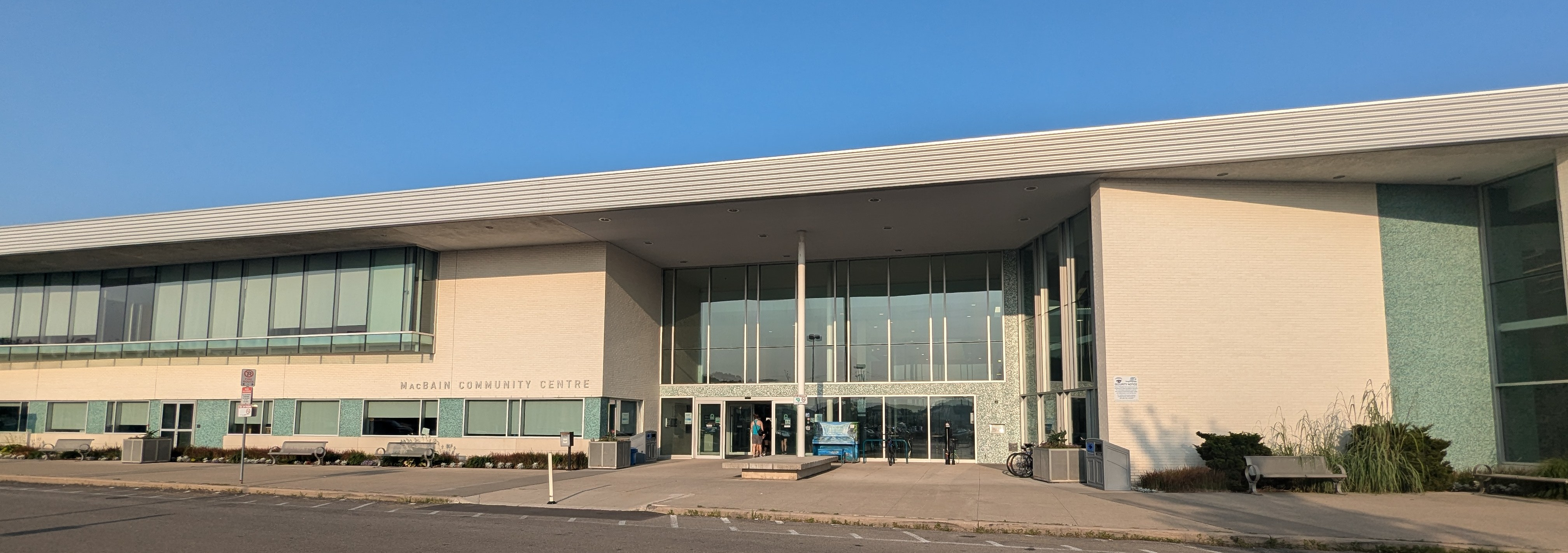
The exterior of the facility

The MacBain Community Centre is a 100,000-square-foot recreation facility in Niagara Falls, Ontario. The community centre has a swimming pool, a walking track, a gymnasium, courts for sports such as pickleball, and several drop-in programs for the local community. A branch of the Niagara Falls Public Library is located within it.

== History ==
The MacBain Community Centre opened in 2005 and cost 24 million dollars to build. Its namesake is John McCall MacBain, who donated one million dollars towards its construction.

The community centre was initially closed during the COVID-19 pandemic, following restrictions on in-person gatherings. Later during the pandemic, the facility was used as a vaccination location.

From 2005 to 2021, the YMCA operated much of the community centre's facilities, after the organization vacated the property, the City of Niagara Falls took over operations. In 2024, the municipal government budgeted 1.2 million dollars to improve the community centre's infrastructure.

From 2020 to 2023, the Niagara Falls Farmer Market was held at the community centre before being temporarily relocated to another location. As of 2025, the market will be held at the community centre again.

There is an outside playground and skatepark attached to the facility. In 2024, a wheelchair accessible swing was installed there, and was the first such swing available in the city.
