= Oshawa Public Library =

Canadian public library system

Coordinates: 43.89492°N 78.86507°W

Oshawa Public Libraries
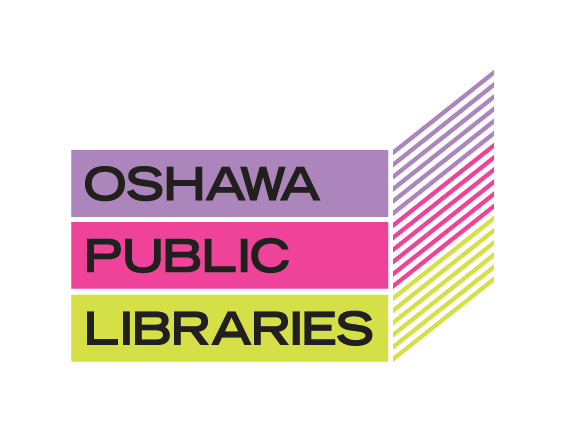

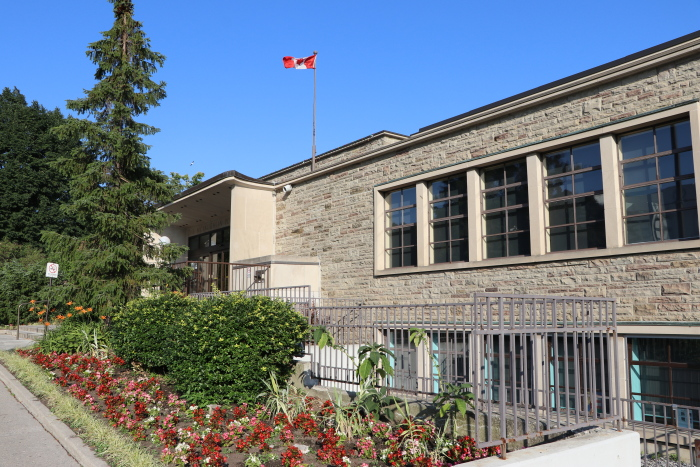
- Location: Oshawa, Ontario, Canada
- Established: 1864 as The Mechanics Institute
- Branches: 4

Access and use
- Population served: 170,000

Other information
- Website: https://oshawalibrary.ca/

Oshawa Public Libraries (OPL) is a public library system that serves a population of more than 170,000 people in the City of Oshawa, Ontario, Canada. OPL has 4 branches, each serving its respective region of Oshawa, and sharing its collections in common amongst all the branches within the system. The City of Oshawa is situated on the Lake Ontario shoreline approximately 60 kilometres east of downtown Toronto.

== Services and collections ==
OPL services include an extensive collection of Genealogy and Local History resources. OPL's collection of online resources has expanded rapidly, and now features over 30 databases covering a great variety of topic areas.

== History ==
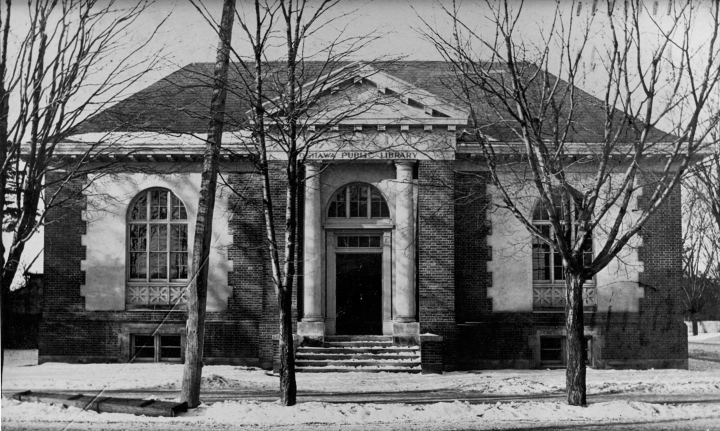
Oshawa Public Libraries, 1909

In 1864, library services were first provided in Oshawa with the formation of the Oshawa Mechanics Institute, located near the intersection of Simcoe Street and King Street, in what is now downtown Oshawa. This organization served as a reading room, sitting behind the D. Allin Bookstore, and offered free courses, as well as a collection of books and magazines. Serving as president was William McGill, and as librarian, William Dickson.

In 1906, a purpose-built library was developed to serve the municipality, thanks to Andrew Carnegie, whose philanthropic support for the development of libraries provided necessary funding for the project. The 1906 Oshawa Public Library was built at the corner of Simcoe Street South and Athol Street West when Oshawa had a population of 5,500. In 1948, the same library in the same building served a citizenry of 29,000, housing over 30,000 books compared to 4,000 books in 1906. In its first year of operations, Oshawa Public Library had about 250 subscribers using its facilities and a circulation of 8,200. In 1948, there were 16,093 subscribers and a circulation of 143,463 volumes, showcasing the tremendous use made of the library by the citizens of the community. This large increase in books, subscribers and circulation mandated the need for a new and bigger library. A proposal was made and the citizens of Oshawa participated in a campaign to have a new library built.

In 1949, the promotion of Oshawa Book Week stressed the importance to Oshawa of having a modern well-equipped library with ample facilities to meet all the needs of the community. Plans were underway to expand library services with a new, modern library building. This library would ultimately be built with support from Col. R. S. McLaughlin amounting to $400,000, providing for the establishment of the contemporary library service.

== Local History and Genealogy Collection ==
The Oshawa Public Libraries holds a variety of resources for those interested in researching their family history or the history of the local area. The main branch (McLaughlin Branch) houses a large collection of pamphlets, photographs, maps, and texts detailing life and business in Oshawa as well as information about early Ontario County and Durham Region. In particular, the collection has unique material pertaining to the McLaughlin family and the development and history of General Motors of Canada.

The Local History collection also includes a large genealogical reference collection, such as city directories for the region dating back to 1923, telephone books, and microfilmed newspapers and census. Microfilms of the local Oshawa newspaper (some dates are missing), the Globe and Mail, Toronto Star, and other major newspapers are available at the McLaughlin Branch in the Local History Room

== The Modern Library ==
The library system operates four branches.

Branch	Address	Location	Notes
Delpark Branch	1661 Harmony Road N. Oshawa, ON L1K 0Z8	North Oshawa Civic Complex	formerly the Legends Centre Branch
Jess Hann Branch	199 Wentworth Street W. Oshawa, ON L1J 6P4	Lake Vista Plaza	
McLaughlin Branch	65 Debwewin Miikan Oshawa, ON L1H 1N2	Downtown, south of City Hall	formerly Bagot Street
John Aker Northview Branch	250 Beatrice Street Oshawa, ON L1G 7T6	Corner of Ritson Road and Beatrice Street	

Branch hours vary, but some branches remain open each day of the week and on weekends, outside of statutory holiday periods.

All branches offer both adult and children's materials, with the McLaughlin branch featuring a separate children's library.

In summer 2010, renovations began on the central McLaughlin branch to rebuild the south wing of the library's main floor. The new McLaughlin main floor was opened in the fall of 2010.

== See also ==
- List of Carnegie libraries in Canada
- List of public libraries in Ontario
