= Barrie Public Library =

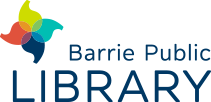
- 44°23′30″N 79°41′17″W
- Type: library system of Barrie, Ontario
- Established: 1862
- Branches: 3

Collection
- Items collected: business directories, phone books, maps, government publications, books, periodicals, genealogy, local history,

Other information
- Website: barrielibrary.ca

The Barrie Public Library (abbreviated as BPL) is the public library system in Barrie, Ontario, Canada. It consists of three branches that host a catalogue of more than 25,000 items.

== Location ==
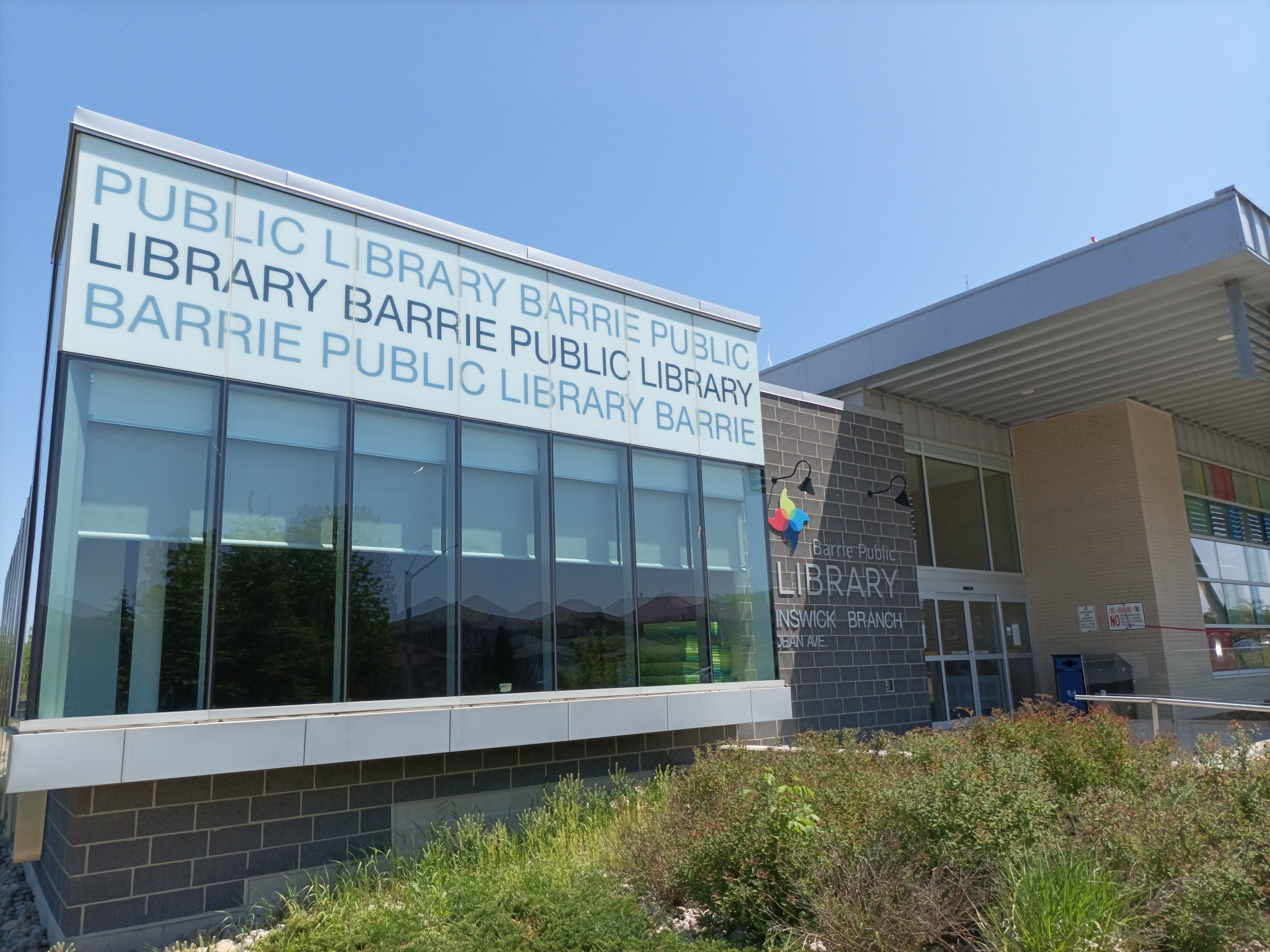
Barrie Public Library Painswick branch

The Downtown Branch is located at 60 Worsley Street in downtown Barrie, near City Hall. The Painswick Branch is located at 48 Dean Avenue, near Yonge Street and Big Bay Point Road. The Holly branch is located at 555 Essa Road (in the Food Basics parking lot). BPL also has kiosks at Allandale Recreation Centre and the East Bayfield Community Centre.

== History ==
The library system was incorporated in 1862, and the first reading room was established in 1871. The Simcoe County Museum was first located in the basement of the library, where historic artifacts were displayed in 1930. The current Downtown branch and hub of the library system was constructed in 1996. The Painswick branch opened on March 12, 2012 and the Holly branch opened on August 5, 2022.

== Services ==
- Information and reference services
- Access to full text databases
- Community information
- Internet access
- Reader's advisory services
- Programs for children, youth and adults

== See also ==
- Ask Ontario
- List of Carnegie libraries in Canada
