= Clinton Branch, Huron County Library =

Library in Clinton, Ontario, Canada

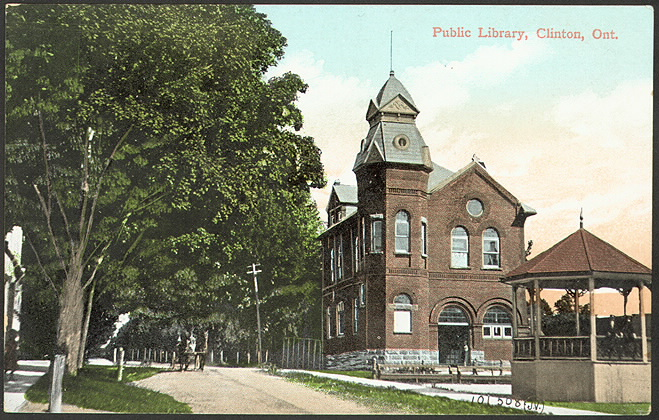
- Postcard showing the library in 1910
- 43.61784932183488°N 81.53812667944807°W
- Location: 27 Albert Street, Clinton, ON, N0M 1L0, Canada
- Type: Public
- Established: 1900; 126 years ago
- Branch of: Huron County Library

Ontario Heritage Act
- Official name: Clinton Town Hall and Library and the Library Park
- Designated: December 11, 1978

Other information
- Website: www.huroncountylibrary.ca/clinton-branch/

Clinton Branch (formerly the Clinton Public Library) is the local branch of the Huron County Library in Clinton, Ontario.

== History ==
The original library building was designed by local architect Joseph Ades Fowler; the design was accepted by committee "after careful consideration" in September 1897. It was originally known as Stavely Hall. "Constructed of pressed red brick and with an open entrance vestibule, Stavely Hall, when it opened in 1900, was considered the area's best-appointed library and reading room." The first part of the town library was built in 1900. It is located in Library Park in Clinton, which is framed by the town hall to the south, the library to the east and commercial blocks to the west and north. The library building is of similar size and height as the town hall.

Built with money from James Stavely, a local settler, the two-storey red-brick building has a three-storey conical tower on the north-east side. The fenestration around the structure varies in shape and size; it features a bold roofline accentuated by brick banding and voussoirs. The second smaller part of the library was built with a Carnegie Foundation grant. The grant of $4,900 was received on January 6, 1915. J. Ades Fowler was the architect for the addition. The Clinton library was the only Ontario library to have an addition funded by the Carnegie Foundation.

The addition is located on the south side of the building and features a circular corner reading room, similar to the north part of the structure. "The building is a worthy example of turn of the century building, both functional and inspired in its design". The building is protected under Part IV of the Ontario Heritage Act, since 1978.

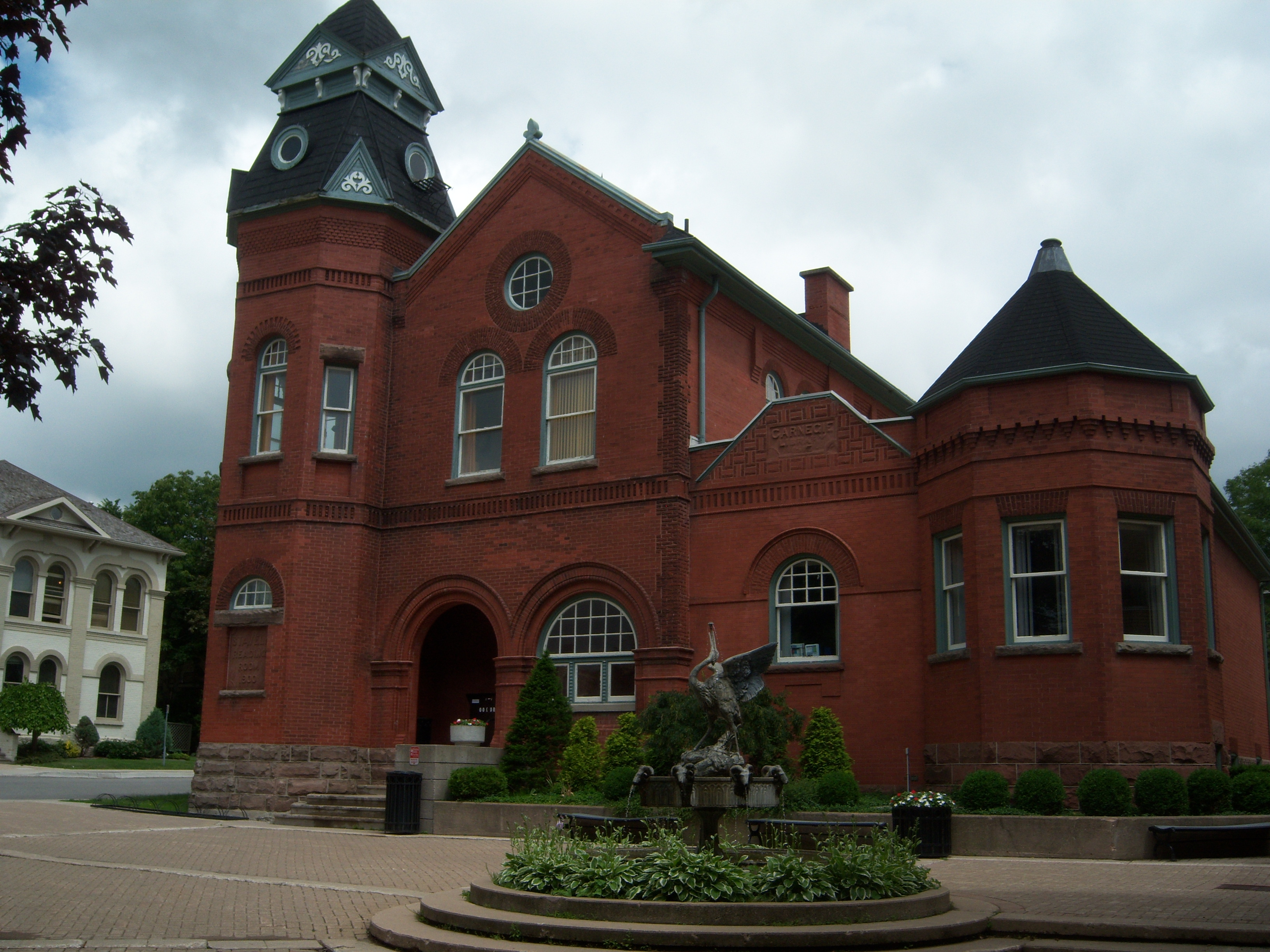
Modern view of the library.

== See also ==
- Ontario Public Libraries
- List of Carnegie libraries in Canada
