= Robert Henry Lindsay =

Canadian painter (1868–1938)

- Born: Robert Henry Lindsay; 23 April 1868; Prescott, Ontario
- Died: 19 March 1938 (aged 69); Brockville, Ontario
- Known for: Painter

Robert Henry Lindsay (April 23, 1868 – March 19, 1938) was a Canadian painter.

== Personal life ==
Lindsay was born at Prescott, Ontario on April 23, 1868. His father, George Lindsay, relocated his family to Brockville, Ontario while Robert was a young child. Robert Lindsay married Margaret Ellen Boucher, at Carleton Place on 30 September 1907. Robert Lindsay was an outdoors-man who liked cycling. He was interested in rowing and was made the first honorary member of the Brockville Rowing Club. Apart from his profession as an artist and a studio painter, he had as a hobby wood carving. Lindsay died at Brockville on March 19, 1938.

== Artist ==
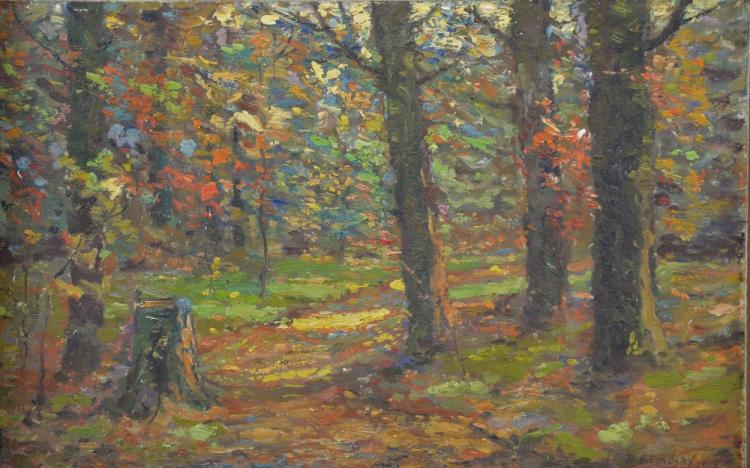
Autumn, 1913. Oil on board. Royal Canadian Academy, Montreal.

From early in his life, Lindsay was interested in art. In addition to his schooling, he attended the Brockville Mechanics' Institute. The Mechanics’ Institute included an art school that provided graphic arts education where Lindsay developed his skills. He took a position as a painter in the James Smart Manufacturing Company. While employed at Smart's he studied painting and sketching under Percy F. Woodcock, R.C.A. at the Brockville Ontario Government School of Art. This led him to a career as a professional artist and painter in oils and watercolour. In 1911 he became a part-time art instructor at the school and later succeeded Woodcock as the art instructor at the Ontario Government School of Art in Brockville, a position that he held for 12 years. He also taught drawing at the St. Alban's Boys School. He sketched with Harold A. Pearl of Toronto, particularly in the Newboro-Westport District of Leeds County. He maintained a studio in Brockville from which he carried on a commercial art business as well as his artistic endeavours.

He was a contributing member of the Arts Club of Montreal. He became a member at its inception in 1912. While known especially for the area of the Thousand Islands, Lindsay also traveled extensively, painting in Maine, Florida, and Ireland.

== Brockville Library ==
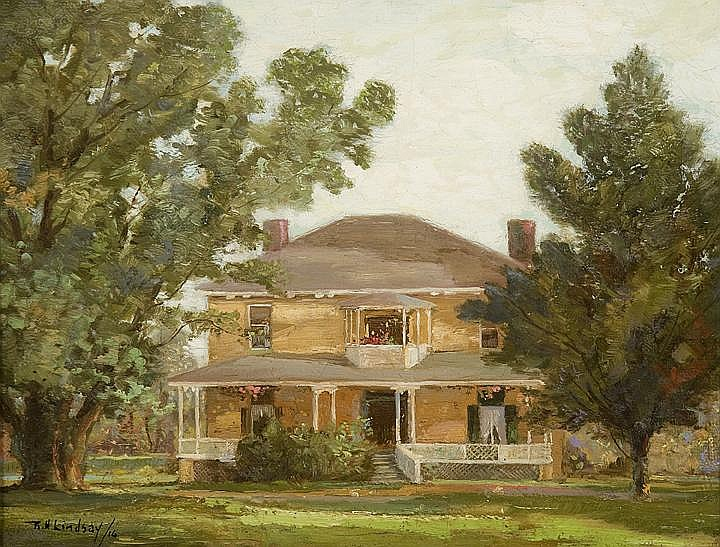
Lindsay residence, Brockville, 1916. By Robert Henry Lindsay.

Robert Lindsay, who had the benefit of the Mechanics' Institute library, became a trustee of the Brockville library. When the Carnegie Library was constructed as the permanent home of the collections he became the vice-chair of the Brockville Public Library Board. He had drawn many pencil sketches of Brockville which are now of historical value. Following his death in 1938 his widow, Margaret Boucher Lindsay, presented about forty of his pencil sketches to the library.

== Exhibitions and collections ==
He participated in the Montreal Art Association Spring Exhibitions from 1911 through to 1934. Lindsay exhibited both oils and watercolours with the Royal Canadian Academy of Arts, Ontario Society of Artists, and the Montreal Art Association. In addition to his regular participation in these shows in Montreal and Toronto, he is known to have had shows in Ottawa, Winnipeg, Chicago, and Belfast, Ireland. Not long after his death, Lindsay's works were shown at the Arts Club of Montreal.

His paintings were posthumously exhibited at D & E Lake Ltd., Toronto in 2006 and 2007.

Works of Robert H. Lindsay are held in the collections of the National Library and Archives of Canada and the Brockville Museum.

== See also ==
- List of Carnegie libraries in Canada
