= Shelburne Public Library (Ontario) =

Public library in Shelburne, Ontario

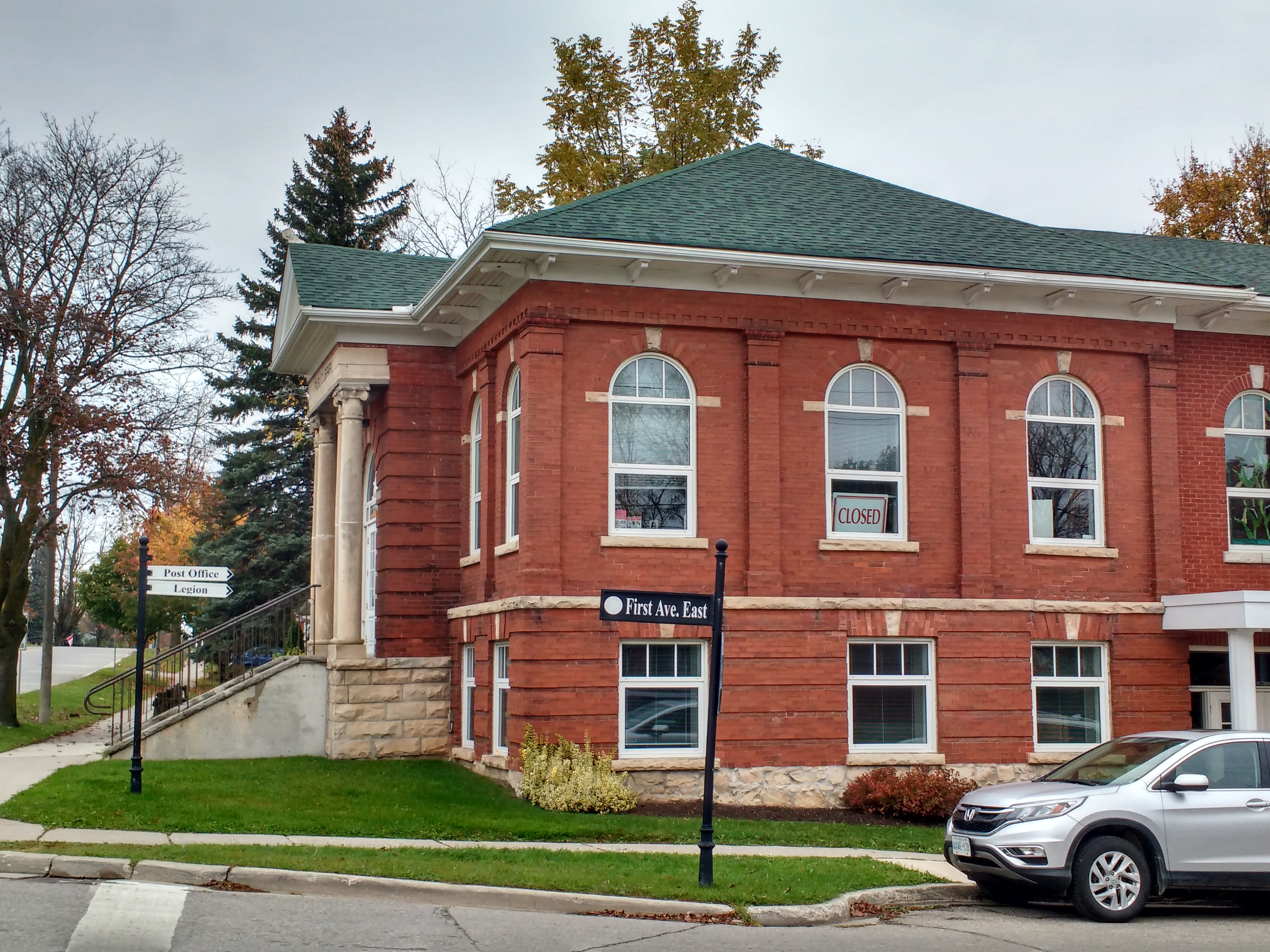
- Side view of the Library, seen in 2017.
- 44.07956°N 80.20473°W
- Location: 201 Owen Sound Street, Box 127, Shelburne ON, L9V 3L2, Canada
- Type: Public
- Established: 1911

Other information
- Website: www.shelburnelibrary.ca/index.html

The Shelburne Public Library is a public library in Shelburne, Ontario which serves the town's residents and taxpayers.

== History ==
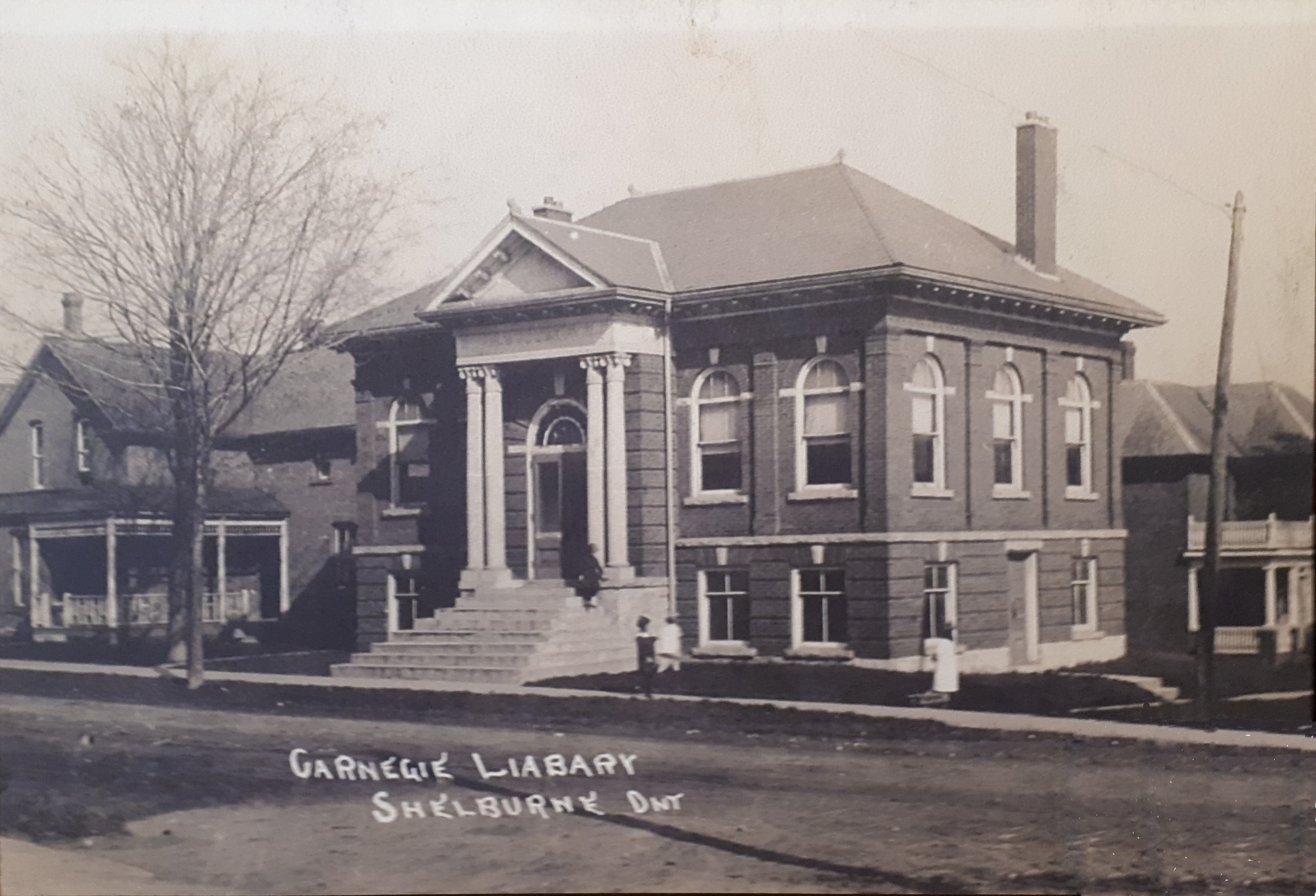
Photo of the original building in the 1910s.

A public meeting organized in January 1911 marked the start of the library. Construction started in June 1911 and the official opening was February 12, 1912. The vault in the basement was added in 1937.

=== Planning ===
On January 21, 1911, Shelburne received a grant $6,000 from the Carnegie Foundation for the construction of a public library. The building was designed by architect J.A. McKenzie, and opened on February 12, 1912. The "architect" was in fact Dr. J.A. McKenzie, the local Presbyterian minister, who won favour when he won a contest to design the local Post Office and was selected to design the library. He submitted several sketches that were returned for revisions before the elevations and interior layouts were officially sanctioned by the Carnegie Foundation.

The front entrance features "a bracketed pediment over a plain frieze supported by columns with modified Ionic capitals".

=== Later history ===
The original Gothic-style building on Owen Sound Street was expanded in 2002 with a SuperBuild Grant of nearly $600,000 that was received from the Canadian Federal and Provincial governments, allowing the building to double in size. An elevator was installed, allowing wheelchair access. An additional $300,000 was raised in the community.

== See also ==
- Ontario Public Libraries
- List of Carnegie libraries in Canada
