= Owen Sound & North Grey Union Public Library =

- 44°33′50″N 80°56′42″W
- Location: 824 1st Ave. West, Owen Sound, ON N4K4 4K4, Canada
- Type: Public
- Established: 1855

Collection
- Items collected: books, periodicals, e-books, audio books, mobile apps, local history, genealogy, online resources, subscription databases
- Size: 83,776 (2010)

Access and use
- Circulation: 302,340 (2010)
- Population served: 38,709 (2010)

Other information
- Director: Tim Nicholls Harrison
- Website: library.osngupl.ca

The Owen Sound & North Grey Union Public Library is a public library in Owen Sound, Ontario which serves the residents and taxpayers of the City of Owen Sound, the Township of Chatsworth, the Township of Georgian Bluffs and the Municipality of Meaford (former Sydenham Township portion). These municipalities provide financial support through taxation. Owen Sound's Carnegie library, which is now protected under the Ontario Heritage Act, is the only one with a vaulted ceiling.

== Services ==
=== General ===
• Online Resources including subscription websites
• eBooks/eAudiobooks
• Interlibrary Load Service/Self-serve ILLO
• Computers with software & internet access
• Free Wireless internet
• Printing including wireless
• Photocopying & scanning
• Mobile Apps
• Material Loans, renewals & holds
• Local History & Genealogy Collection
• Library To Go - service for shut-ins
• Room Rentals
• Tours
• AV Equipment Rentals
• Adaptive Technology

=== Youth Services ===
• Online Resources including subscription websites specific to Children & Teens
• eBooks/eAudiobooks specific to Children/Teens
• Computers with software & internet access
• Story times
• PA Day & Early Dismissal programs
• After school clubs
• Summer programming

=== Adult Learning Centre ===
• General Upgrading (including studying for a driver's license, filling out forms)
• Math
• Writing (including grammar and vocabulary)
• Reading
• Spelling & Phonics
• Learning disabilities
• Correspondence courses
• English as a second language
• Computer basics

== See also ==
- Ontario Public Libraries
- List of Carnegie libraries in Canada
