= Simcoe County Museum =

Museum in Ontario, Canada

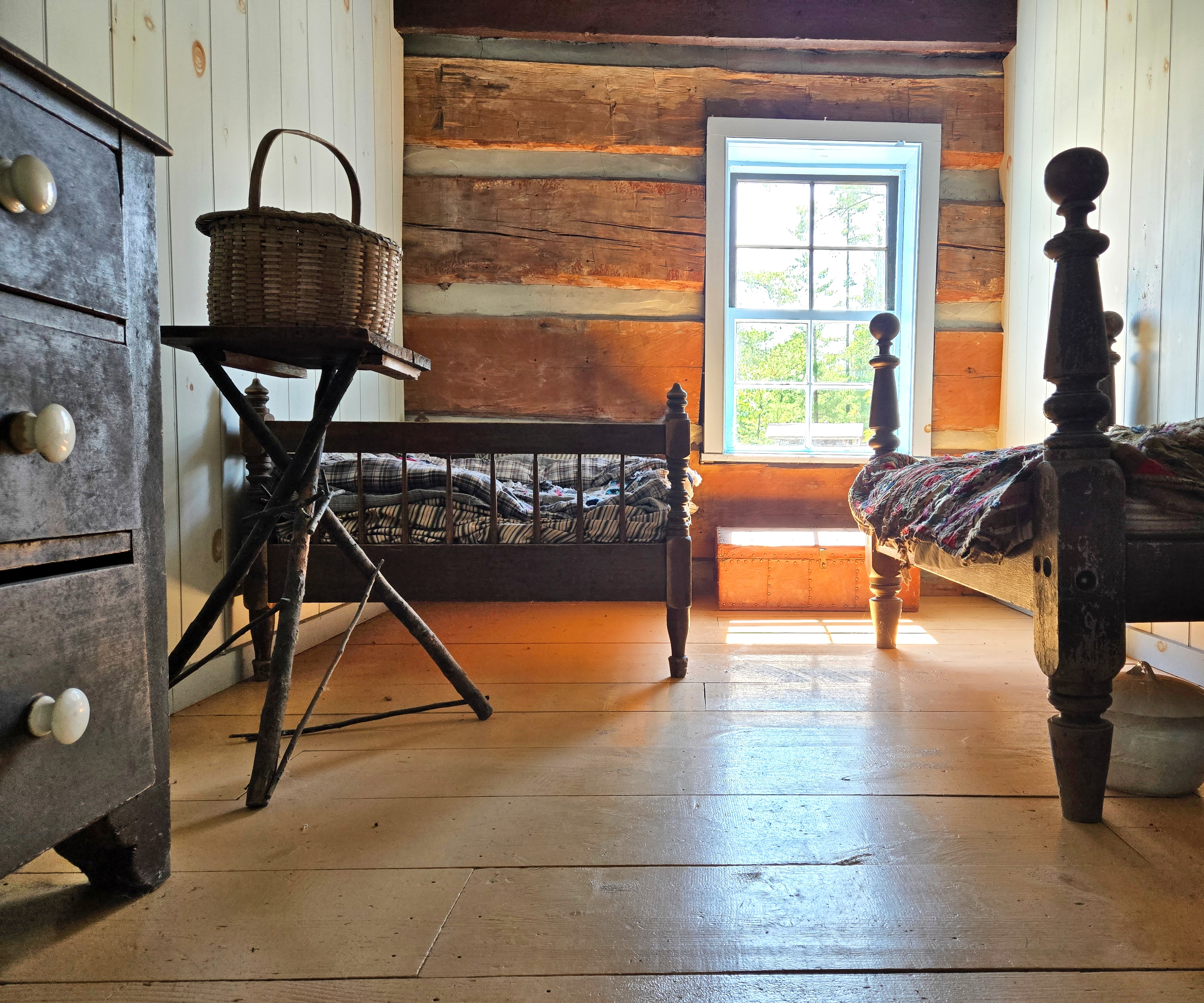
- Log cabin at Simcoe County Museum
- Established: 1926
- Location: 1151 Highway 26, Minesing, Simcoe County, Ontario, Canada
- Coordinates: 44°26′39.84″N 79°44′51.98″W
- Visitors: 30,000
- Website: museum.simcoe.ca

Simcoe County Museum is a museum in Minesing, Simcoe County, Ontario, Canada.

== History ==
Simcoe County Museum was founded in 1926 when the County Women's Institute compiled a local history and collected artifacts. A display was established at Barrie Public Library in 1930. The museum moved to its current location—on 327 acres (132 ha) of land—in 1962.

== Exhibits ==
The museum features five galleries, and 16 heritage buildings. Much of the collection has been acquired through donations.

Artifacts include a log cabin, train station, blacksmith, historic schoolhouse,19th century church, heritage machinery and tools, and a replica of the historic main street in nearby Barrie.

Winter activities include an ice skating trail, and a sugar shack where maple tree sap is processed into maple syrup.

The museum also features school programs, day camps, and a gift shop.
