= Goderich Branch, Huron County Library =

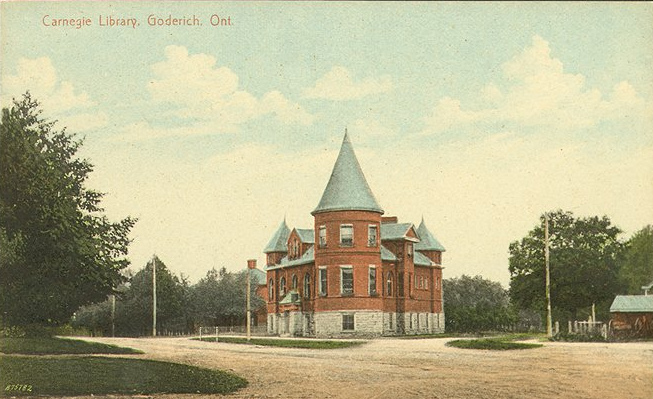
- Postcard showing the library in 1910
- 43.74199°N 81.71302°W
- Location: 52 Montreal Street, Goderich, ON N7A 2G4, Canada
- Type: Public
- Branch of: Huron County Library

Ontario Heritage Act
- Official name: Goderich Public Library
- Designated: 1978

Other information
- Website: www.huroncountylibrary.ca/goderich-branch/

Goderich Branch (formerly Goderich Public Library) is the local branch of the Huron County Library in the town of Goderich, Ontario.

== History ==
The city had a Mechanics' Institutes, operating since 1853.

In 1902, a grant of $10,000 from the Carnegie Foundation allowed for the construction of a public library between 1903 and 1904. The building was designed by architect J.A. Fowler. The grant was received on March 14, 1902, with the library opening on March 3, 1905. As of 2021, it still operates as a library.

=== Design and construction ===
After much debate, the triangular-shaped design for the building was accepted by the Goderich Library Association in 1903. "Fowler proposed a red brick Romanesque edifice with twin towers, large rounded windows, high ceilings and living quarters for the librarian. The problem of the irregular shaped lot was solved by incorporating the tall round corner tower with a commanding view of the street and Square." After a lavish opening ceremony in 1905, Fowler became a member of the library board and advised on its preservation and maintenance.

The building "was finally completed in 1905 and included two towers as well as a living quarters for the librarian on the top floor (now the attic used for storage and where the Hobbit door hides). Over the years, the upper rooms of the building were used as a museum and to store town records until 1934 when the Huron County Museum was formed. [...] The library has closed on several occasions including the small pox epidemics in 1907 and 1920 as well as due to a fuel shortage in 1920."

The one-and-a-half-storey red-brick library with finished basement is built in the Romanesque style of architecture, typical for public buildings early in the 20th century. The building has three towers. "The largest tower sits at the intersection of Montreal and Lighthouse Streets and is the focal point of the building. It is a round tower topped by a peaked roof and features a special reading room on the interior. The other two towers are square and located at the Montreal Street and Lighthouse Street corners of this irregular, triangular plan building." The building is protected under Part IV of the Ontario Heritage Act, designated by the Town since February 2, 1978.

=== Early Features ===
A new feature was introduced to the Library in 1913, where users could pay 5 cents and reserve a book. They would then receive a post card advising them the book had arrived at the library; users then had three days (Sundays and holidays excluded) to come and get the book. At the time, this method of reservation was quite popular in Stratford, Toronto and other large centres in the province.

== Later years ==
A meeting held on September 19, 1941, at the Goderich Public Library was the foundation for the current Huron Country Public Library. The "Huron County Library Association" was to be a library cooperative meant to bring library services to all corners of the county.

== See also ==
- Ontario Public Libraries
- List of Carnegie libraries in Canada
