= Port Hope Public Library =

Canadian public library in Port Hope, Ontario

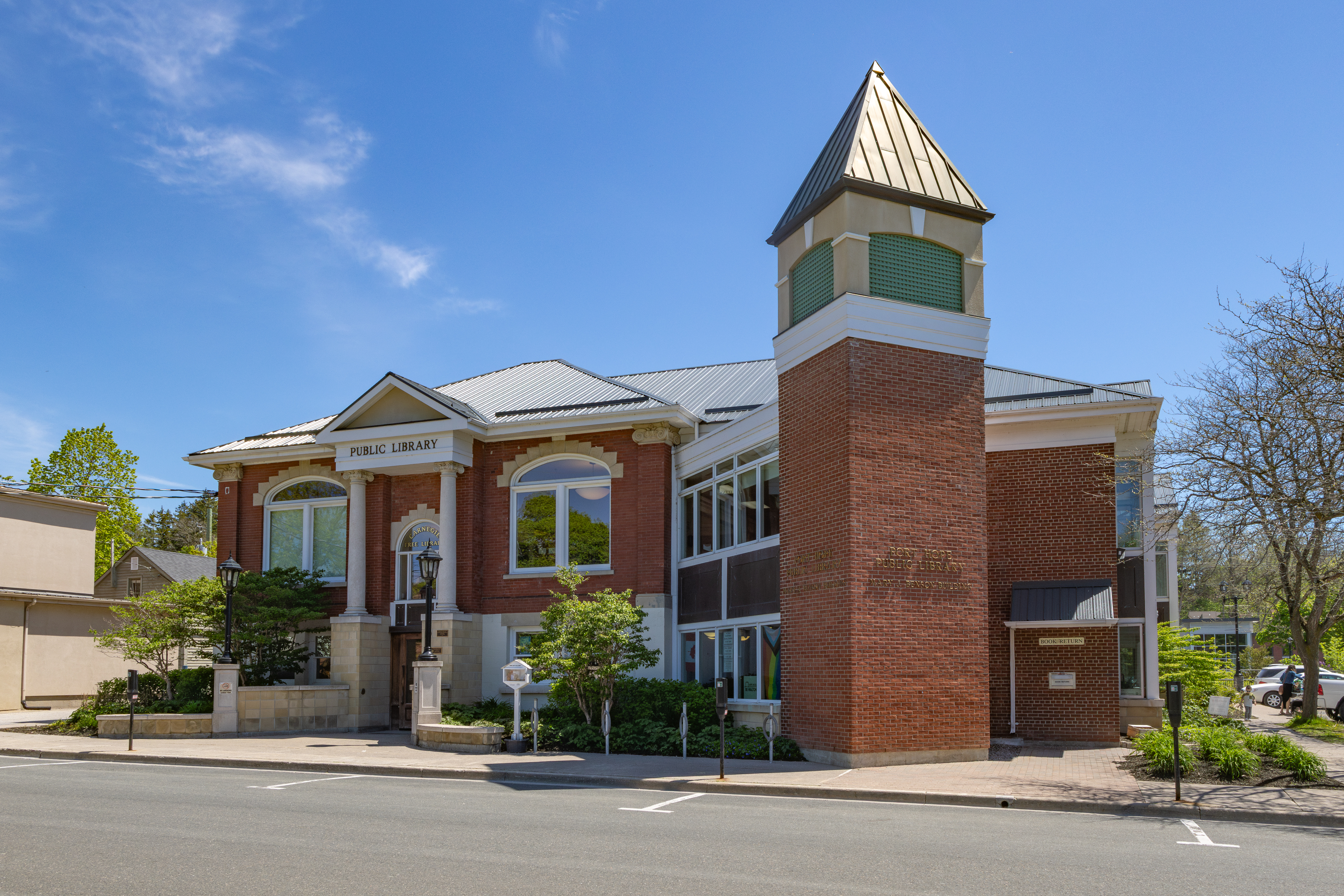
- Mary J Benson Branch
- 43°57′00″N 78°17′33″W
- Location: Port Hope, Ontario, Canada
- Type: Public library
- Established: 1852
- Branches: 2

Access and use
- Circulation: 149202

Other information
- Website: www.porthopepubliclibrary.ca

The Port Hope Public Library is a public library system with two branches that serves the town of Port Hope, Ontario, Canada.

== History ==
The first incarnation of the Port Hope Public Library was a Mechanic's Institute established in 1852. This was followed by the building of a public library in 1912 with a grant from the Carnegie Foundation. The library was erected at 31 Queen St and later became the Mary J. Benson Branch. In 1971 the library was expanded and the front facade altered. The next alteration to the building came in 1982 with the installation of an elevator in the south west corner of the building which, in turn, required a relocation of the front door. In 2000 the Town of Port Hope and the Hope Township were amalgamated by the municipal government which added the smaller Garden Hill Branch to the Port Hope Public Library network. The Queen St building underwent further renovations in 2001 which effectively doubled the size of the library and added columns that imitated the facade of the initial 1912 building. These renovations were done from January to December 2001 and cost 2.2 million dollars. During this time much of the library collection was stored but service did continue from a nearby storefront. Upon its reopening in 2002, the building was named the Mary J. Benson Branch of the Port Hope Public Library. Ten years later, in 2012 the library celebrated its 100th anniversary.

== Programs and awards ==
The "Library.Card.Cool" campaign made efforts to increase library membership among local children and won the Ministry of Culture Award in 2006.

The "Open a BOOK; Open a BUSINESS @ Port Hope Public Library" program aimed to expand the library collection to educate and promote local business and agriculture. This program won the Angus Mowat Award for Business Initiative in 2007.

The D. Becker Summer Tutoring Program is an annual program that provides free tutoring in French, reading and math for the children in the community over the summer. It is named after Dieter Becker who provided funding to allow the continuation of the program in 2016.

== See also ==
- List of Carnegie libraries in Canada
- List of public libraries in Ontario
