= St. Catharines Public Library =

Library system in St. Catharines, Ontario, Canada

Coordinates: 43.1604°N 79.2460°W

- Location: St. Catharines, Ontario, Canada
- Established: 1888
- Branches: 4

Collection
- Size: 200,000 (2025)

Access and use
- Population served: 152,958 (2024)

Other information
- Director: Ken Su (CEO)
- Parent organization: City of St. Catharines
- Website: https://www.myscpl.ca

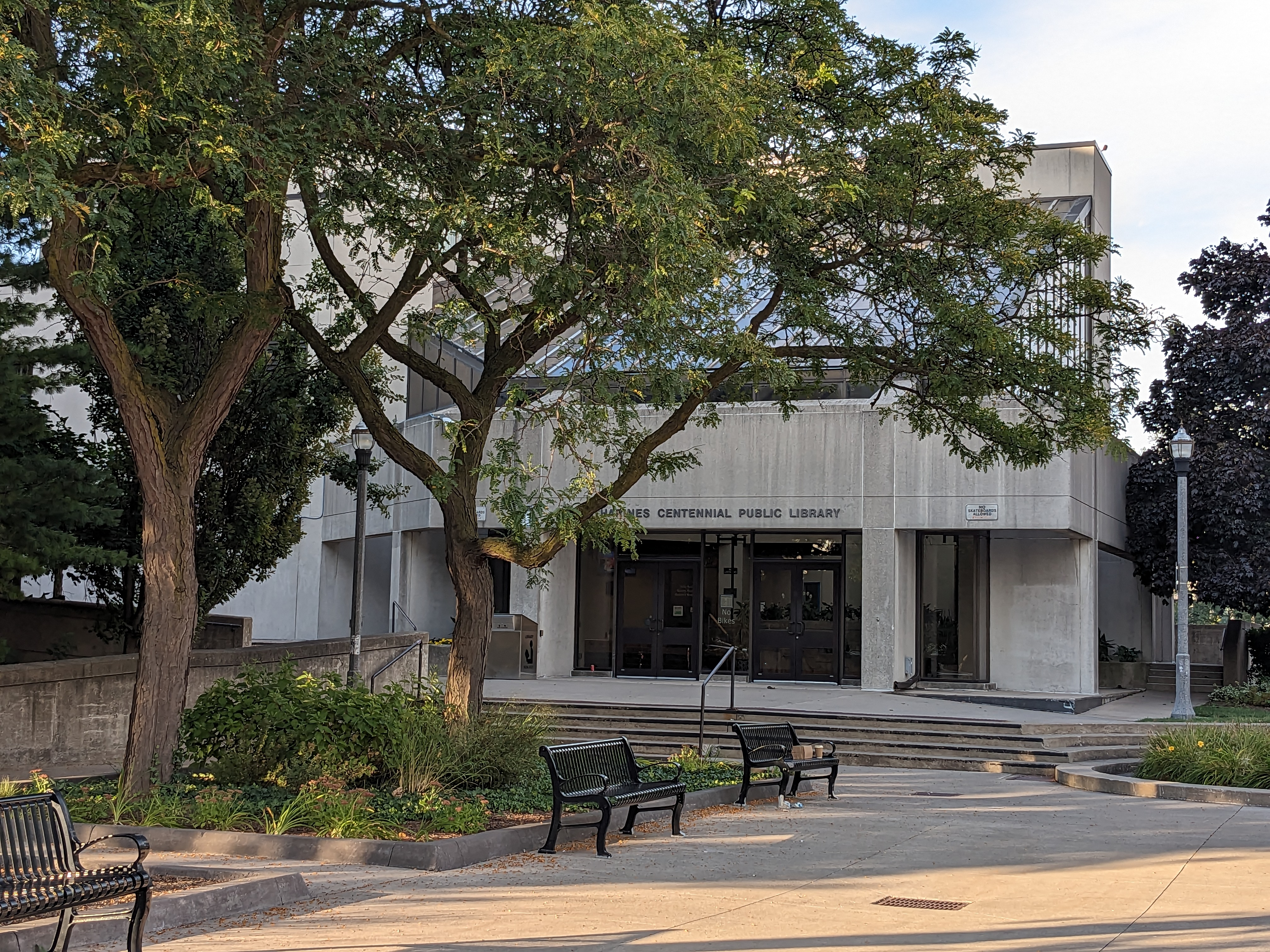
The main entrance of the central branch on James Street.

The St. Catharines Public Library (SCPL) is a public library system that provides service to residents of St. Catharines, Ontario. The library has four branches: Central, Merritt, Port Dalhousie and Dr. Huq. Materials available for loan include books, films, musical instruments, and video games. As of September 2024, residents from Niagara Falls, Niagara-on-the-Lake, Port Colborne, Thorold, Wainfleet, and Welland could borrow items from the library.

== History ==
=== Central branch ===
As early as 1888, various locations were rented for library use, but there were no permanent structures. The first dedicated building for the library opened in 1905 in Downtown St. Catharines, where the Robert S.K. Welch Courthouse has since replaced it. It was a Carnegie library. This building was expanded in 1939, 1940, and 1965, as a result of the growing population in the city. When Port Dalhousie, Merritton, and Grantham were amalgamated into the city in 1961, there was even greater demand for better library infrastructure. This led to that building closing in 1971 and being replaced by the current central branch. It was named the centennial branch to celebrate the centennial anniversary of the city's founding. In 1976, the library buried a time capsule to commemorate the occasion. There was also a sundial placed aboveground. In 2021, the sun dial was stolen from the premises. The time capsule is still intact and will be opened in 2076.

In 2021, the central library branch installed barriers and gates around the library, with the intention of deterring homeless people and acts of vandalism. The City of St. Catharines budgeted 50,000 dollars for these renovations. These renovations were criticized for "excluding the homeless as members of the public". In 2022, the central branch received two robots from a local restaurant that are used to carry items across the library. As of 2023, further renovations are planned, with a budget of 4.8 million dollars. A particular focus of these renovations is expanding community areas within the library. More than 100,000 physical items have been removed to make room for these spaces, with a greater emphasis being placed on access to digital materials. 65,000 of the removed items were duplicate materials. Bookshelves will be reduced in height and aisles will be widened as accessibility features. Local historians have criticized this weeding process for removing access to vital information in regards to their research. An estimated ten percent of materials have been removed from the library's special collections. Historians have also criticized the lack of public consultation in regards to these discarded materials.

=== Port Dalhousie branch ===
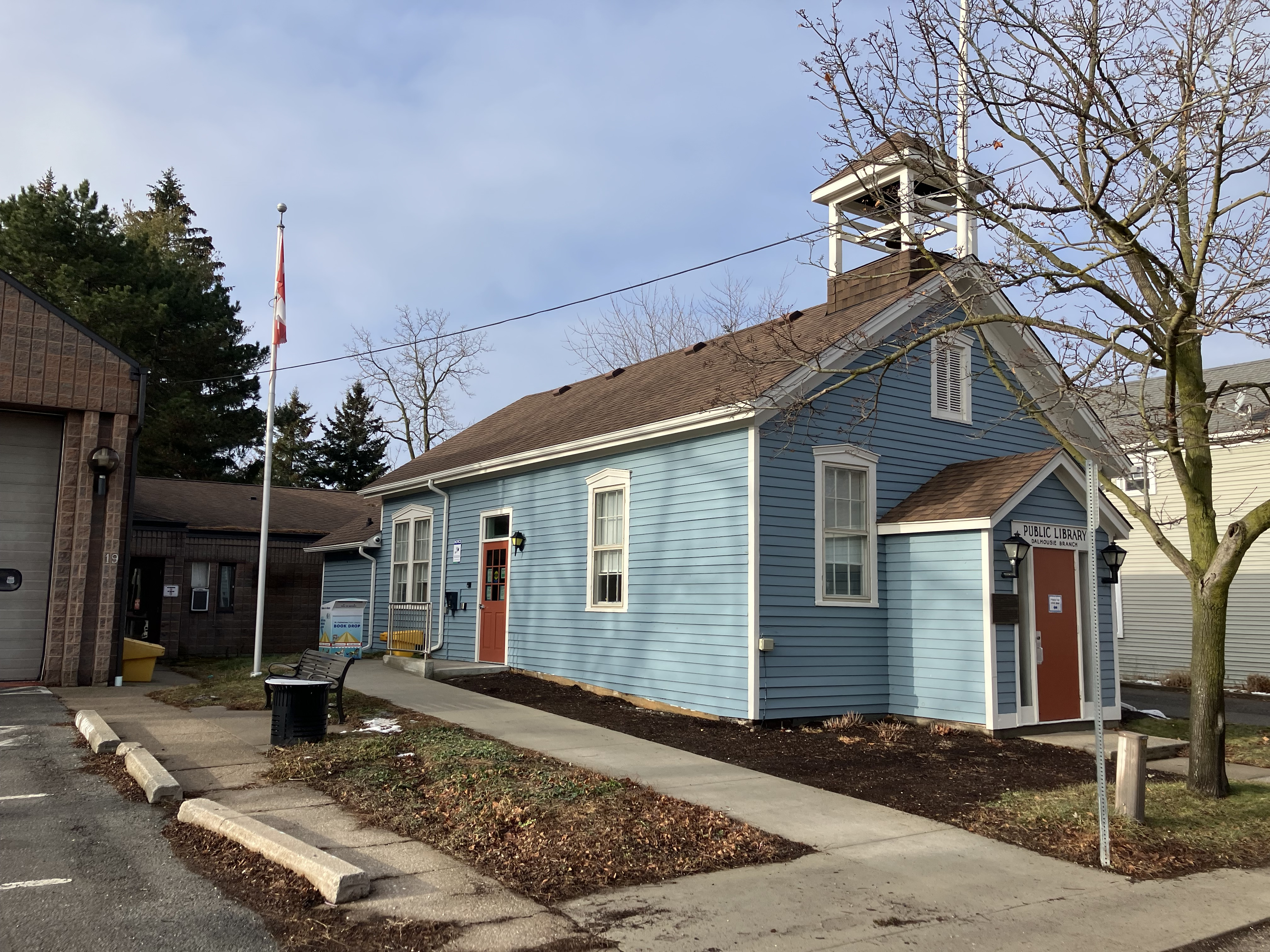
The Port Dalhousie Branch in 2026

In 1961, the town of Port Dalhousie amalgamated with St. Catharines and its townhall was converted into a new library branch for the city.

In 2023, the branch in Port Dalhousie launched a program where the library remained open during unstaffed hours. This program expanded access to the library from three days to six days a week. These changes were made permanent in 2024.

=== Merritt branch ===
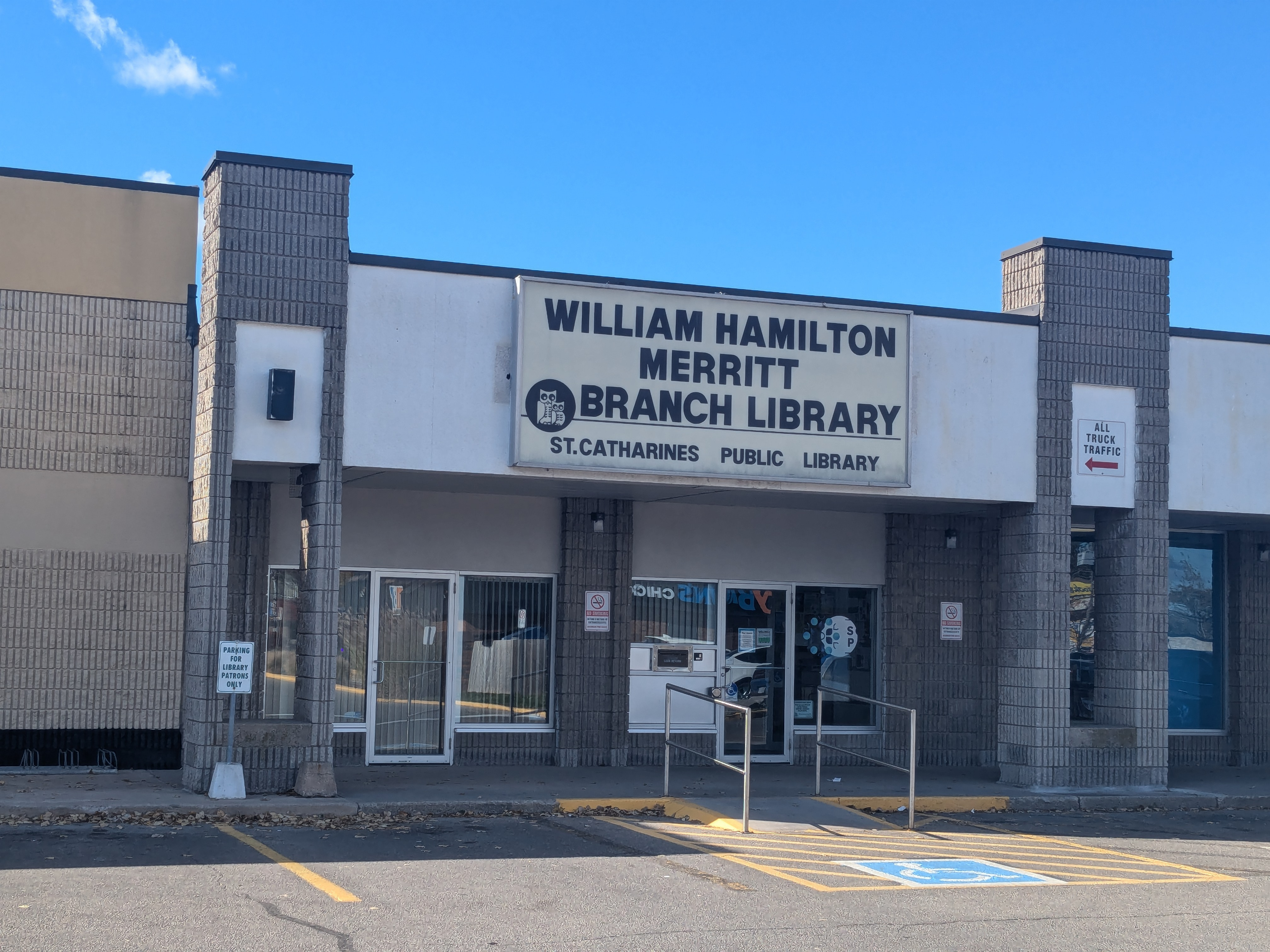
The Merritt branch in 2024

The library opened a branch on Merritt Street to serve the community of Merritton. In 1966, another branch was opened at the nearby Pen Centre to provide additional service. This location proved more successful than its predecessor and the Merritt Street location closed in 1968. In 1986, the remaining branch relocated to 149 Hartzel Road.

In 2020, the possibility of relocating the branch once again was discussed. Potential locations were proposed before these plans were postponed. In 2025, the lease for the building on Hartzel Road was not renewed, and the branch relocated to the Pen Centre.

=== Dr. Huq ===
The Dr. Huq branch operates from within the Kiwanis Aquatic Centre. In 2023, there was a trial for keeping the library open on Sundays. The trial was well received but it was not extended due to budget constraints.

== See also ==
- Hostile architecture
- List of Carnegie libraries in Canada
- List of public libraries in Ontario
- Thorold Public Library
- Niagara Falls Public Library (Ontario)
