= Orillia Public Library =

Canadian library

Coordinates: 44.6081°N 79.4209°W

- Location: 36 Mississauga St. W., Orillia, Ontario, Canada
- Established: 1864 (as the Mechanics’ Institute and Literary Association)
- Branches: 1

Other information
- Website: www.orilliapubliclibrary.ca

The Orillia Public Library is a single-branch public library in Orillia, Ontario, Canada.

== History ==
Plans began for the establishment of a public library in 1864. A Mechanics' Institute and Literary Association was founded the same year, and it established library spaces in various community halls in downtown Orillia. In 1895, the Association changed its name to the Orillia Public Library. Library membership was fee-based, and before 1911 there were around 300 members.

In March 1909, the Orillia Times newspaper began to publish debates and opinion pieces regarding applying for a Carnegie library grant. The grant would allow the Orillia Public Library to build its own standalone library branch, rather than renting space in several locations downtown. Considerable controversy ensued regarding the acceptance of money from Andrew Carnegie, who was considered by some locals to be a strikebreaker (the 1892 Homestead strike had led to the deaths of several people). Other Orillians were concerned that, by accepting a grant from an American fund, Orillia would lose its Canadian character.

After some debate, the Orillia Council, led by Mayor Crawford Goffatt, applied for a Carnegie grant of $10,000 in 1909. They received a larger grant of $13,500 on 10 April 1909.

The library opened to the public on 28 December 1911, and amended its membership system to be free to all (rather than fee-based).

== Building ==
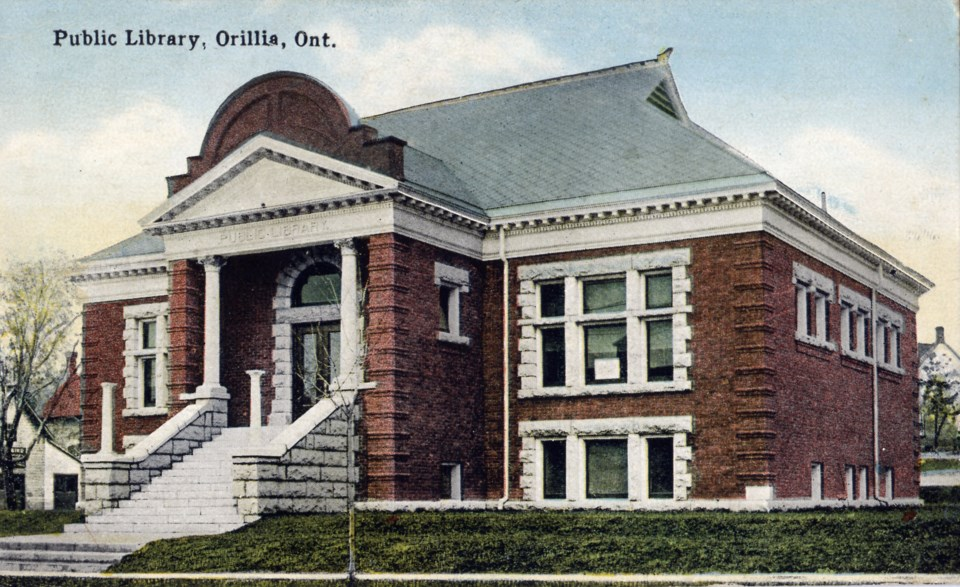
The Orillia Public Library, circa 1922

Local architect William Henry Croker was tasked with designing the building. He had designed several other buildings in Orillia, including the St. James Anglican Church, the Fire Hall on Peter Street, two schools, and the local YMCA.

Croker's first design was rejected by Andrew Carnegie for being too large, and for containing a games room and smoking room (Carnegie required the libraries to be built for exclusively educational purposes). The drawings were amended and in May 1910 the library was approved to be built.

The library was constructed by Joseph Langman for $11,710. A limestone brick building, it featured a lecture hall with 200 seats, reading areas, book shelving, and was located on the corner of the Orillia farmer's market (at the Mississauga St. and Andrew St. intersection).

After 1911, the library building underwent several changes. In 1961, the building was expanded to include a new entrance and rear extension. In 1968 it was expanded again, and the library's original façade was covered. In 1980, a periodical room was added. This renovation also added wheelchair-accessible entrances, a covered entrance from the market parking lot, a circulation desk, and elevators.

In January 1992, the roof of the library collapsed due to the weight of snow. The library was closed until May 1992 for repairs.

After 1999, due to a lack of space in the library, discussions began to construct a new library building. The original library was demolished and in 2012 a new library building was opened on the same site.

The new library building, which was significantly expanded to 47,000 square feet, includes improved archival storage, computer and programming rooms, a 24-hour book drop, and a dedicated information desk. The building is mainly constructed of glass, limestone, and terracotta, with natural lighting from skylights and large windows. It was designed as a "green library", with features meant to reduce energy expenditure and water use. Its windows are etched with designs meant to evoke leather book spines.

== Services ==
In addition to physical book stacks, the Orillia Public Library offers a digital library for ebooks, audiobooks, films, television shows, and music. Its digital library also includes online resources for learning (including language and business courses) and research on local subjects.

The library regularly schedules events and programming for children, teenagers, and families, including reading clubs, storytelling sessions, art and music programming, and yoga classes.

Its services include technological help and computer classes, exam proctoring for students, computer and printing services, and interlibrary loans. The library also has 3D printers, vinyl cutters, sewing machines, button makers, VHS conversion machines, and other appliances that members may rent.

The library offers services for new immigrants to Canada including ESL conversation circles and multicultural book clubs. It also offers personalized genealogical and local history services. The library also has an on-site coordinator to help locals navigate housing, mental health, and addiction recovery services.

The library often hosts exhibitions on art or local history.
