= William Austin Mahoney =

Canadian architect (1871–1952)

William Austin Mahoney (1871–1952) was a Canadian architect. During the first half of the 20th century, Mahoney was the leading architect in Guelph, Southwestern Ontario. Mahoney brother, Harry, was mayor of Guelph in 1935–36. Among the many buildings attributed to him, Mahoney designed several Carnegie libraries in Ontario: Aylmer, Campbellford, Elmira, Exeter, Fergus, Forest, Fort Frances, Kingsville, Midland, Parkhill, Port Hope, Stirling, Tillsonburg, Watford, and Whitby.
