= Thorold Public Library =

Library in Thorold, Ontario

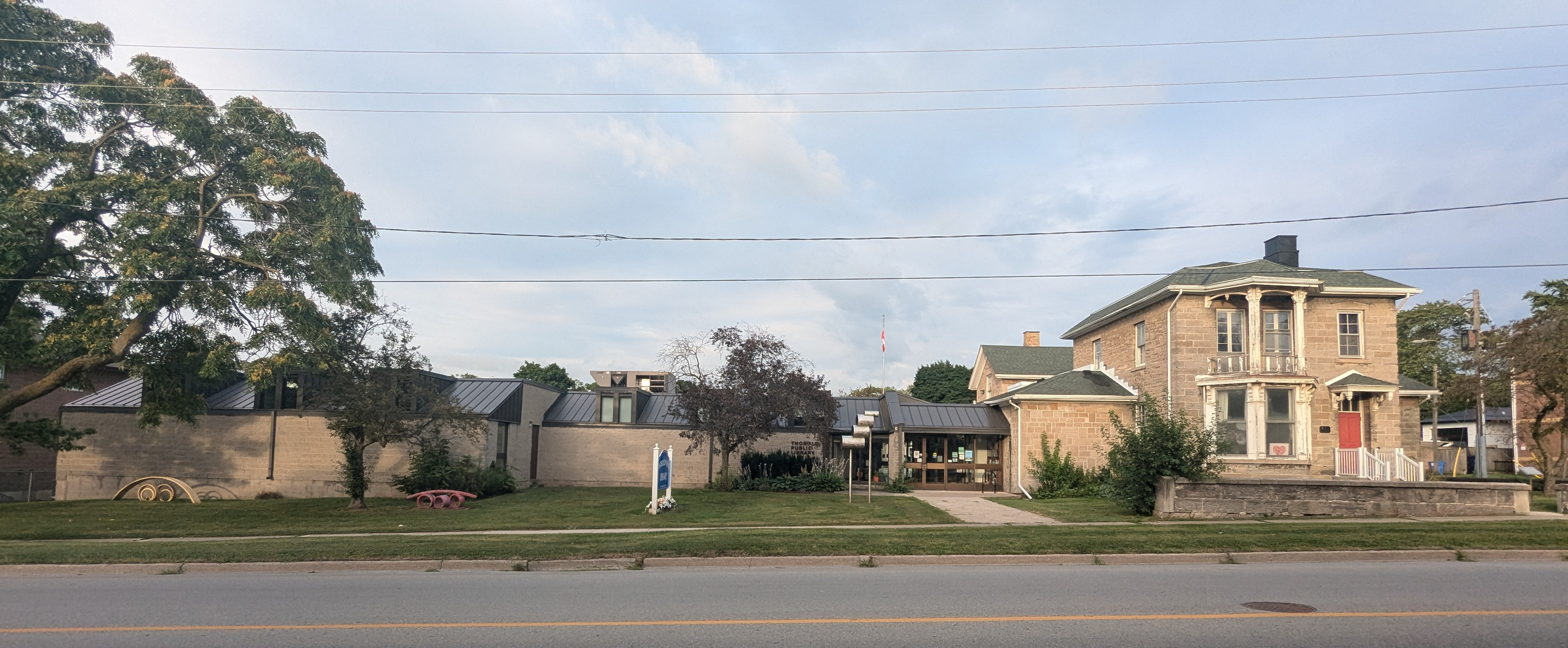
- The library in 2024
- 43.1263°N 79.1987°W
- Location: 14 Ormond Street North, Thorold, Ontario, Canada
- Established: 1912
- Branches: 1

The Thorold Public Library is a building in Thorold, Ontario, located on 14 Ormond Street North.

== History ==
Thorold's first library was a private institution that opened in 1858 called the Thorold Mechanics' Institute. It was unprofitable and ended up donating its 5,000 book collection when the city undertook ownership of it. The new public library, established in 1895, was originally called the Thorold Free Library.

Thorold was approved for a Carnegie Library grant and a new building opened in 1912. This library operated until 1983 and was replaced by the current location attached to Chestnut Hall. In 2012, Chestnut Hall was assessed by a historical society that determined it was "badly showing its age" and may also be at risk of a fire due to damaged wiring.

In 2020, Thorold's city council considered creating an additional branch to the Canada Games Park but ultimately decided against it due to plans to expand the current building. These renovations are expected to cost somewhere between six and eight million dollars. Plans for a branch in the south of the city, which was deemed to be a more suitable location, were discussed but with no definitive plans.

In 2022, the library stopped issuing fines to patrons in order to improve access for those experiencing financial difficulties. In 2023, patrons of the library borrowed 60,621 physical items. That same year, the library digitized newspaper clippings from the 1870s onwards. The library offers access to laptops and internet hotspots. Library patrons may also borrow items in other libraries through the Libraries in Niagara Co-operative program.

== See also ==
- St. Catharines Public Library
- Niagara Falls Public Library (Ontario)
- List of libraries in Ontario
