= Niagara Falls Public Library (Ontario) =

Public library system in Niagara Falls, Ontario, Canada

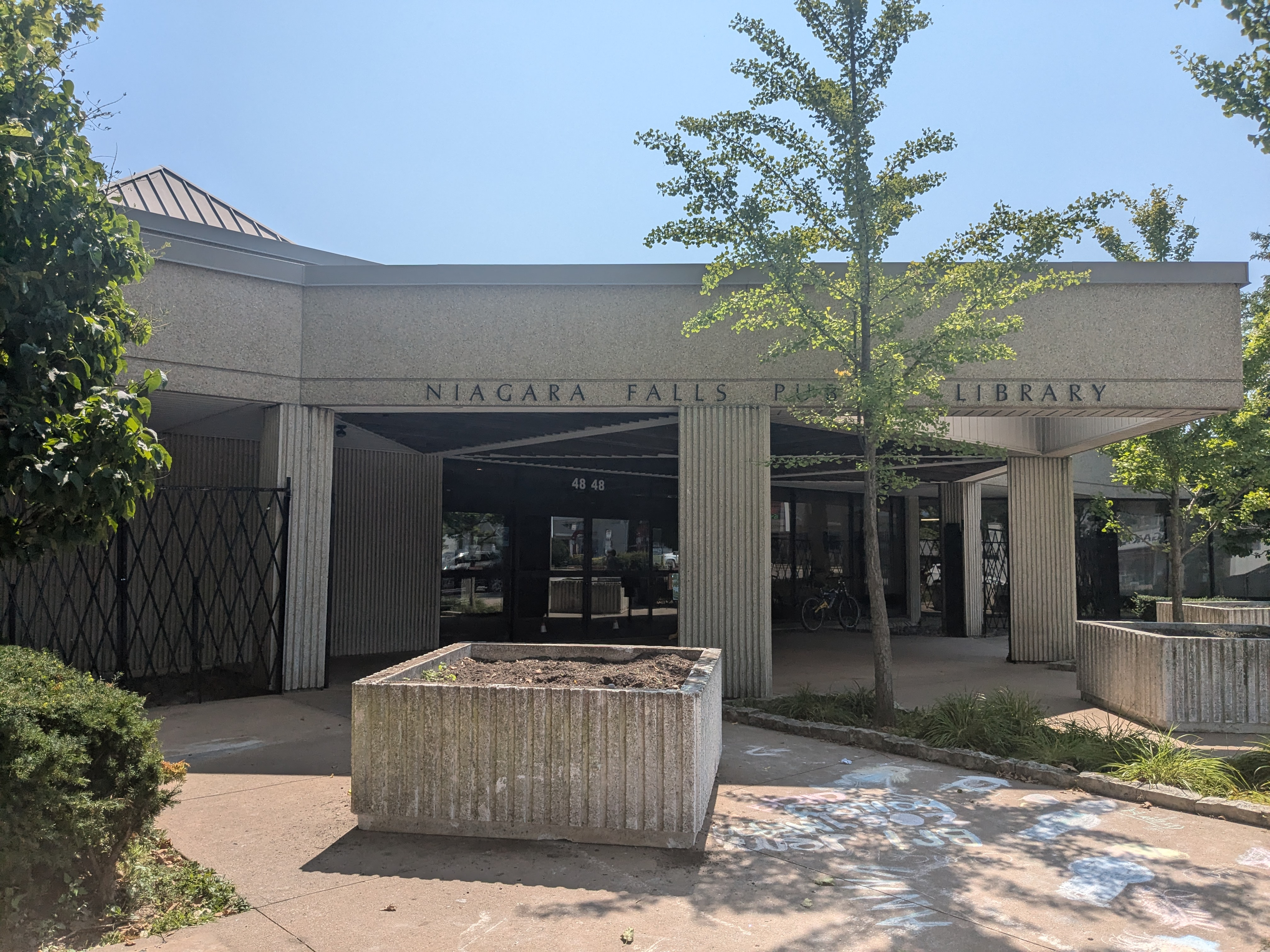
- Victoria branch of the library
- Location: Niagara Falls, Ontario, Canada
- Type: Public
- Branches: 3

The Niagara Falls Public Library is a public library system in the Canadian city of Niagara Falls, Ontario. The library has four branches: Victoria Avenue, Stamford Centre, Chippawa and the Community Centre. There is one former branch at Drummond (closed 1993). A bookmobile provides resources to different areas of the city.

== History ==
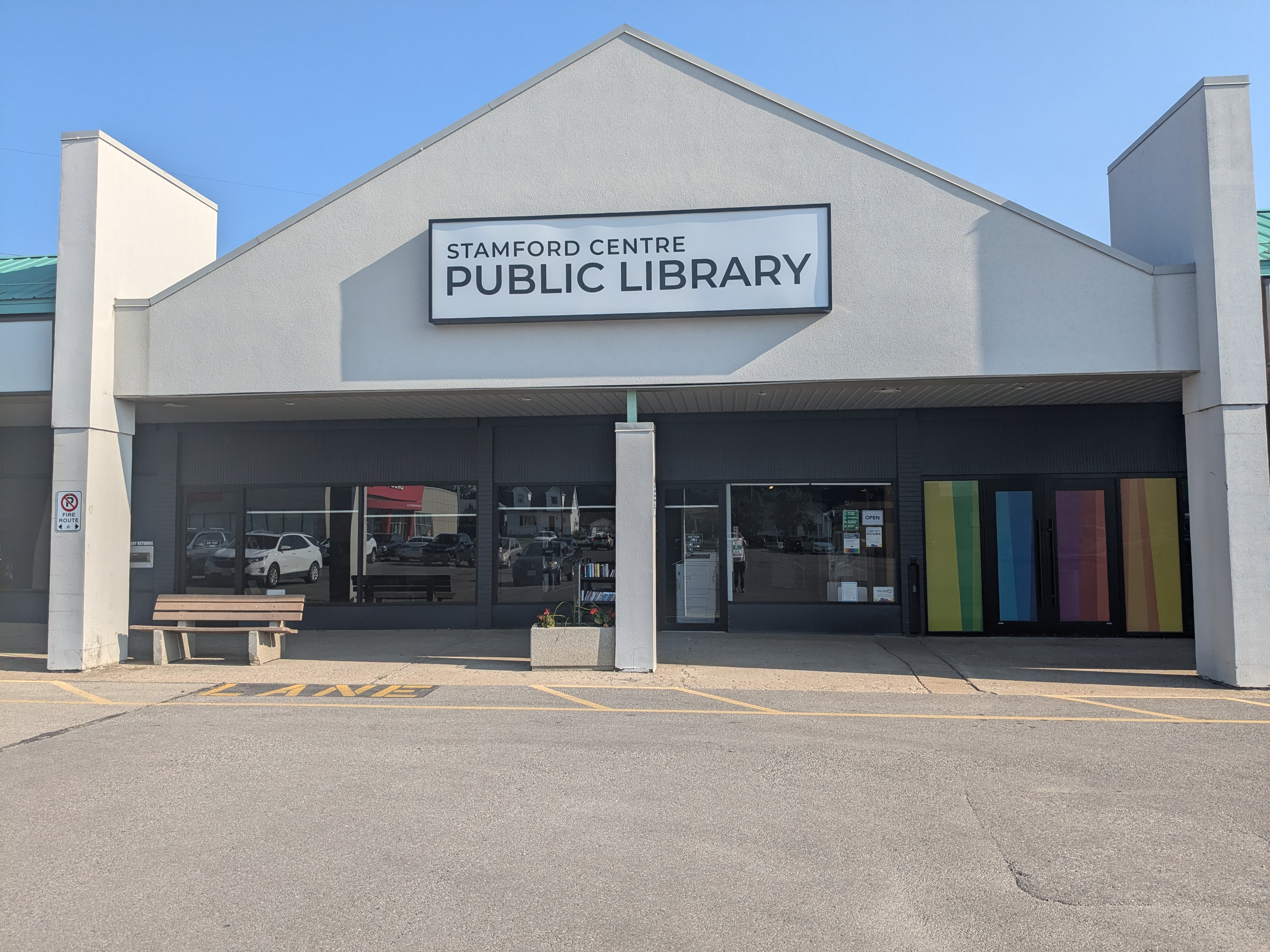
The Stamford Centre branch after renovations were completed

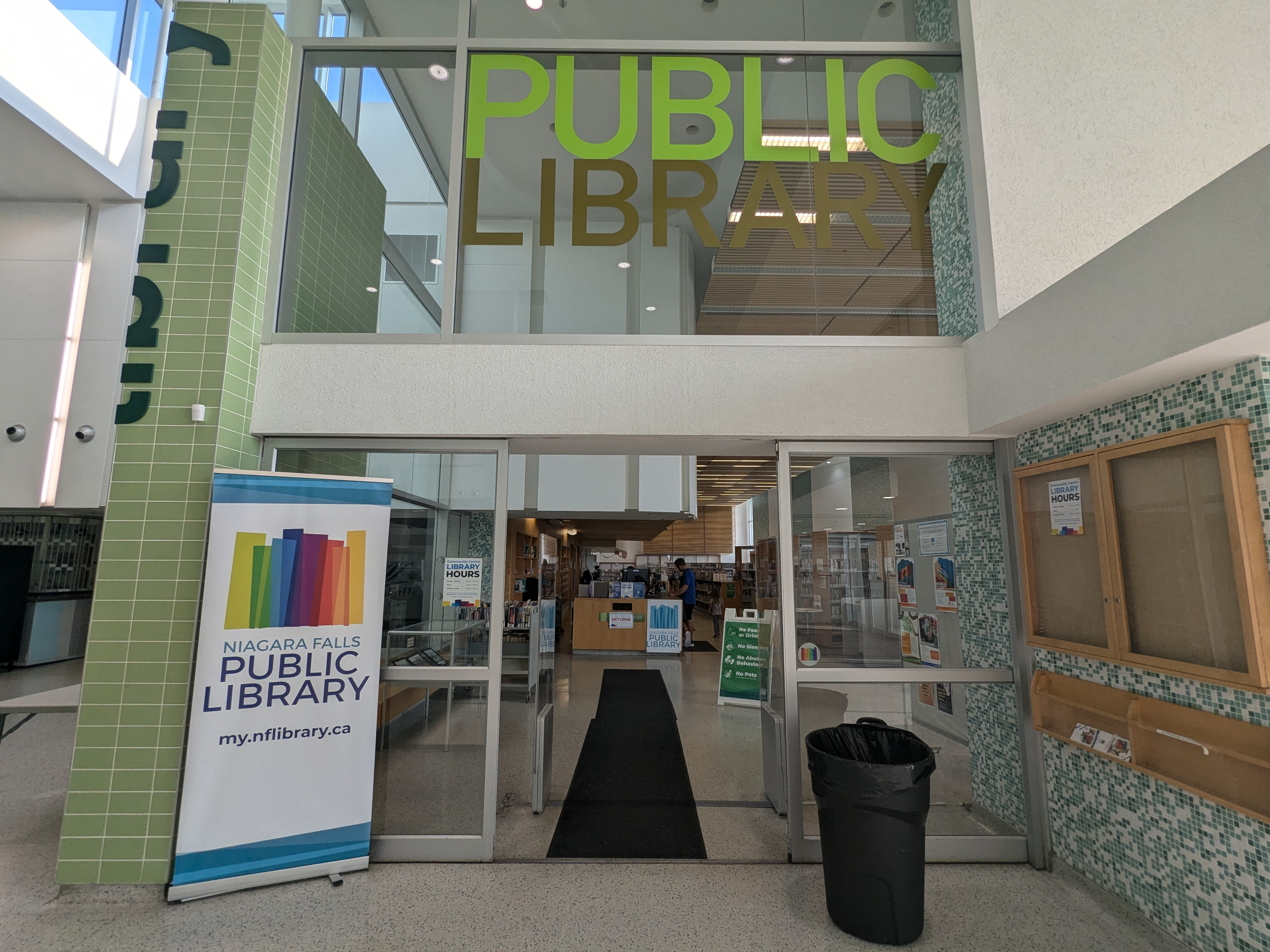
The Community Centre branch

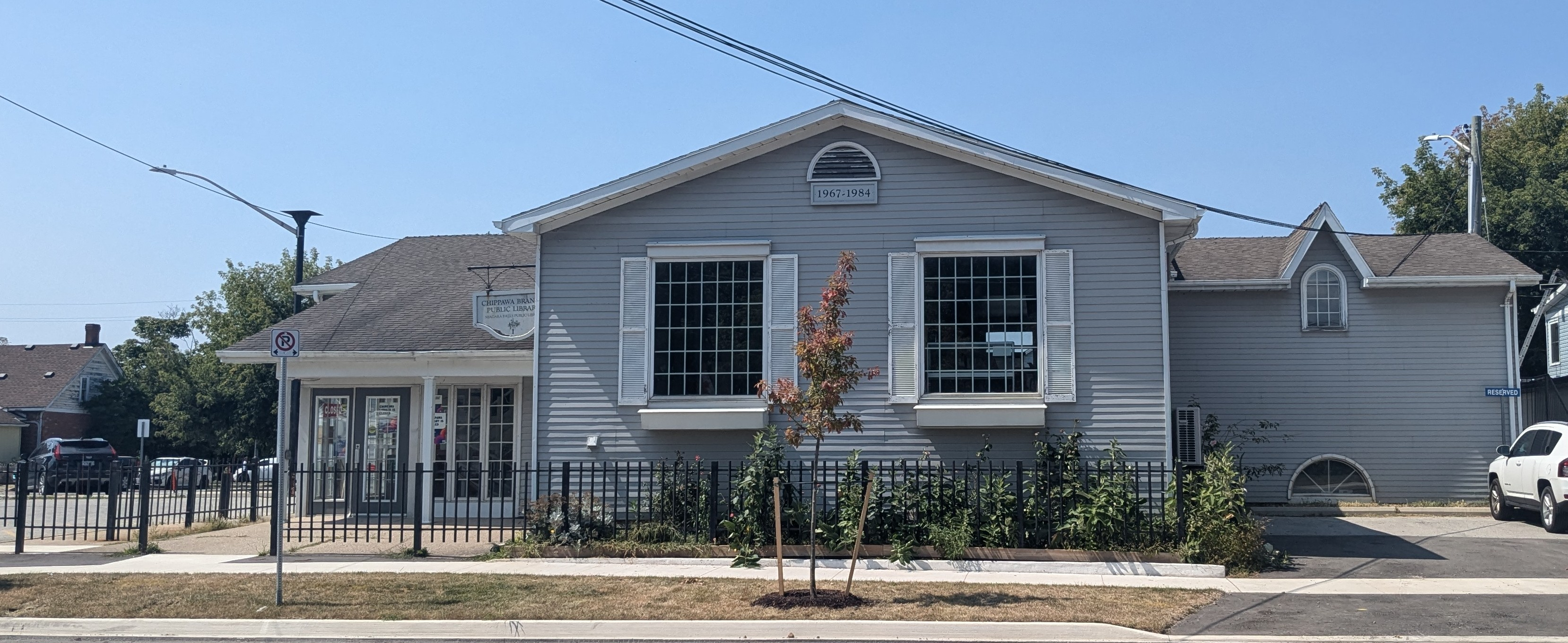
The former Chippawa branch, which is now closed

Before a public library or the city of Niagara Falls were established, mechanics institutes existed in the townships of Stamford, Drummondville, and Clifton. In 1895, all mechanics institutes in Ontario were converted into public libraries, with these services eventually becoming the purview of an expanding Niagara Falls. An application was made to create a Carnegie library in a centralized location and a branch in the southern end of the city was then closed. Information about these early libraries are scarce, but records indicate that women borrowed more books than men, and approximately 80% of these books were fiction.

In 1951, the library expanded their record collection. Older releases were lent out for free and 78 rpm records became available to rent. The fee varied on the size of the disc: with two cents being charged per day on ten inch records and three cents being charged per day on twelve inch records. There were approximately a thousand photographs contained in the children's department by 1961 and these were borrowed by teachers and students. In 1962, the library created a microfilm collection of local archived newspaper clippings from the 1800s. In 1966, paintings from local artists could be borrowed for a fee.

In 2021, the library completely removed fines for patrons who were late in returning materials. If items are not returned within 28 days, they are charged a replacement fee. In 2023, the library had 45,000 members, which was approximately half the city's population. That year, the library digitized old resources such as VHS and audio cassette tapes for historical preservation. The library has a program where gardeners are given free seeds. There is also a program that offers fishing supplies and equipment. There is a reading club for children each summer.

=== Victoria ===
A library branch on Victoria Avenue was established in 1910, which was a Carnegie library. In 1951, the building was extensively renovated to provide more space for its collection, as certain materials were being kept in the basement out of necessity. The interior was also redecorated. In 1953, new light fixtures were installed. An additional library wing opened in 1956. Structural renovations made to the basement were finished in 1959. In 1963, there was a fire in the basement, which destroyed old editions of magazines and newspapers. Firefighters saved some records and maps.

In 1968, the library board began considering a new location. A 700,000$ federal grant was sought to build it. No money by the federal government was given, which left the city to undertake the associated expenses. A property formerly used as an Eaton's store on Victoria Avenue was purchased and demolished for this purpose. Construction of a new building cost 1.75 million dollars and a "gift fund" was established for local residents to offer funding for additional furnishings such as lounge chairs. The new library opened in 1974.

In 2018, the Victoria branch received a donated piano as part of a broader project to display them in public spaces. This branch is also the only one to lend musical instruments. In 2022, the branch was used as a warming centre for homeless individuals during the winter. In March 2024, the city council discussed whether some of the Victoria branch could be converted into housing for the homeless. This prompted the library board, a separate entity that operates the libraries in the city, to send a letter in response. The letter expressed concerns about the idea and reiterated its autonomy.

=== Drummond ===
The Drummond branch was the second branch to open. In 1949, it was relocated from one location on Main Street to another on the same street. An opening ceremony featuring the Governor General of Canada was held. It was the first library in Canada to be dedicated by someone holding this position. The new site was protested by a business delegation, while the mayor of the city stated that it was within the library board's remit. The library building was visited by librarians from other places in Ontario that wished to study it. There were also librarians that visited from New York. An auditorium with a capacity of 145 people was built for the branch. It was the first auditorium to be built for a library in Canada and the project cost $11,500. A minimum $3 fee was charged to third parties who wished to use it. An extra dollar was charged per hour for use at night and groups that charged for admission had a minimum fee of $5. A committee reviewed applications to use the auditorium. The branch had a room for high school students specifically. In 1978, the city council cut the library's budget by $35,000. This caused the library board to consider closing the branch. They decided to keep it open but with reduced hours. In 1992, the library board decided to close the branch after further budget cuts as it would save an estimated $50,000 annually and was not as busy compared to other branches. Businesses on Main Street that would be impacted by the closure signed a petition to keep it open. Despite these efforts, the branch was closed in 1993. The property was sold later that year to the Greater Niagara Transit Commission. A 1927 piano present in the building was also sold.

=== Stamford ===
The Stamford library branch opened in 1957 on Portage Road and funding was originally provided by the Stamford Township Council. In order to establish the branch, the Niagara Falls library board signed a five year lease while the Stamford library board agreed to pay the rent. This was the first time a contract to provide library service was created in Ontario. A copy of the contract was given to the Department of Education for other municipalities to study if they wished to form similar arrangements. The branch allowed those residing in Stamford to have greater access to library resources, as the township concluded that operating an independent system would be less cost efficient. Patrons were initially restricted to borrowing three books before more materials were prepared for circulation. In 1958, 1,849 members borrowed 29,496 books from the branch. Approximately 1,200 of these patrons were children.

When the lease expired in 1962, the library was moved to a building behind the Town and Country plaza. The rent, still paid for by the township, went from $140 to $297 monthly. A shopping plaza was considered to be a more ideal location due to traffic. A strike by truck employees delayed the library's opening date, as it had not yet received purchased shelving. When the township was amalgamated by the city, library service was not interrupted. In 1963, stained glass depicting a nativity scene was installed by a local artist on windows in the children's section of the library.

In 1974, the library relocated within the plaza itself. The branch was expanded in 1986. In 2021, the Stamford branch closed for renovations. The COVID-19 pandemic in Ontario caused delays in its implementation. In 2023, A. N. Myer Secondary School was used as a temporary location for the branch. The library branch reopened in April 2024. A community fundraiser and $760,000 from local casinos were used to fund these renovations.

=== Chippawa ===
The first library in Chippawa opened in 1921. There was not a public library until 1967. This library cost 32,000 dollars and operated until 1984, when it was relocated into a larger building. In May 2024, that building was closed permanently. The closure caused MPP Wayne Gates to make a statement in the Ontario legislature about the lack of library funding in the province. One factor relating to its closure was the building's lack of accessibility. However, the Library opened a new branch across the street in August 2025, which is a temporary building until a permanent home will be created as part of an upcoming Chippawa community centre and arena.

== See also ==
- St. Catharines Public Library
- Thorold Public Library
- Niagara-on-the-Lake Public Library
- List of libraries in Ontario
