= List of libraries in Leeds =

This is a list of libraries in Leeds, England, United Kingdom.

== Libraries ==
- Allerton Bywater Library
- Ardsley and Tingley Library
- Armley Heights Library
- Armley Library
- Beeston Library
- Belle Isle Library
- Boston Spa Library
- Bramley Library
- Broad Lane Library
- Burley Branch Library
- Calverley Library
- Catholic Literary Institute library, est.1851
- Chapel Allerton Library
- Chapeltown Library
- Compton Road Library
- Cow Close Community Corner
- Crossgates Library
- Dewsbury Road Library
- Drighlington Library
- Farsley Library
- Foreign Circulating Library, est.1778
- Garforth Library
- Gildersome Library
- Guiseley Library
- Halton Library
- Hawksworth library
- Headingley Library
- Heaton's Circulating Library
- Hebrew Literary Society library, est.1907
- Holbeck Library
- Holt Park Library
- Horsforth Library
- Hunslet Library
- Hunslet Subscription Library
- Industrial Co-operative Society Library
- Ireland Wood Library
- Kippax Library
- Kirkgate Market library
- Kirkstall Library
- Law Library
- Leeds Arts University library
- Leeds Beckett University library
- Leeds Central Library
- Leeds Conservatoire library
- Leeds Institute of Science, Art and Literature library
- Leeds Libraries
- Leeds Library, est.1768
- Leeds Mechanics' Institute library, 1824-1940
- Leeds Philosophical and Literary Society library
- Leeds Trinity University library
- Lofthouse Library
- Meanwood Library
- Medical Library, est.1768
- Methley Library
- Middleton Library
- Moor Allerton Library
- Morley library
- New Subscription Library, est.1793
- Oakwood Library
- Old Library, Dewsbury Road
- Osmondthorpe Library
- Otley Library
- Pudsey Library
- Quaker Meeting House library
- Rawdon Community Library
- Richmond Hill Library
- Rothwell Library
- Scholes Library, Leeds
- Seacroft Library
- Sheepscar Branch Library
- St James's University Hospital Library
- Swarcliffe Library
- Swillington Library
- Swinnow Library
- Thoresby Society library
- University of Leeds Library, est.1874
  - Brotherton Library
  - Edward Boyle Library
  - Health Sciences Library, University of Leeds
  - Laidlaw Library, University of Leeds
- Wetherby Library
- Whinmoor Library
- Woodhouse Free Library
- Yeadon Library
- York Road Library and Baths
- Yorkshire College Library
- Yorkshire Naturalists' Society Library

== See also ==
- List of libraries in the United Kingdom
- Literature of Leeds
- Media in Leeds
