= Mechanics' institute =

Educational establishment

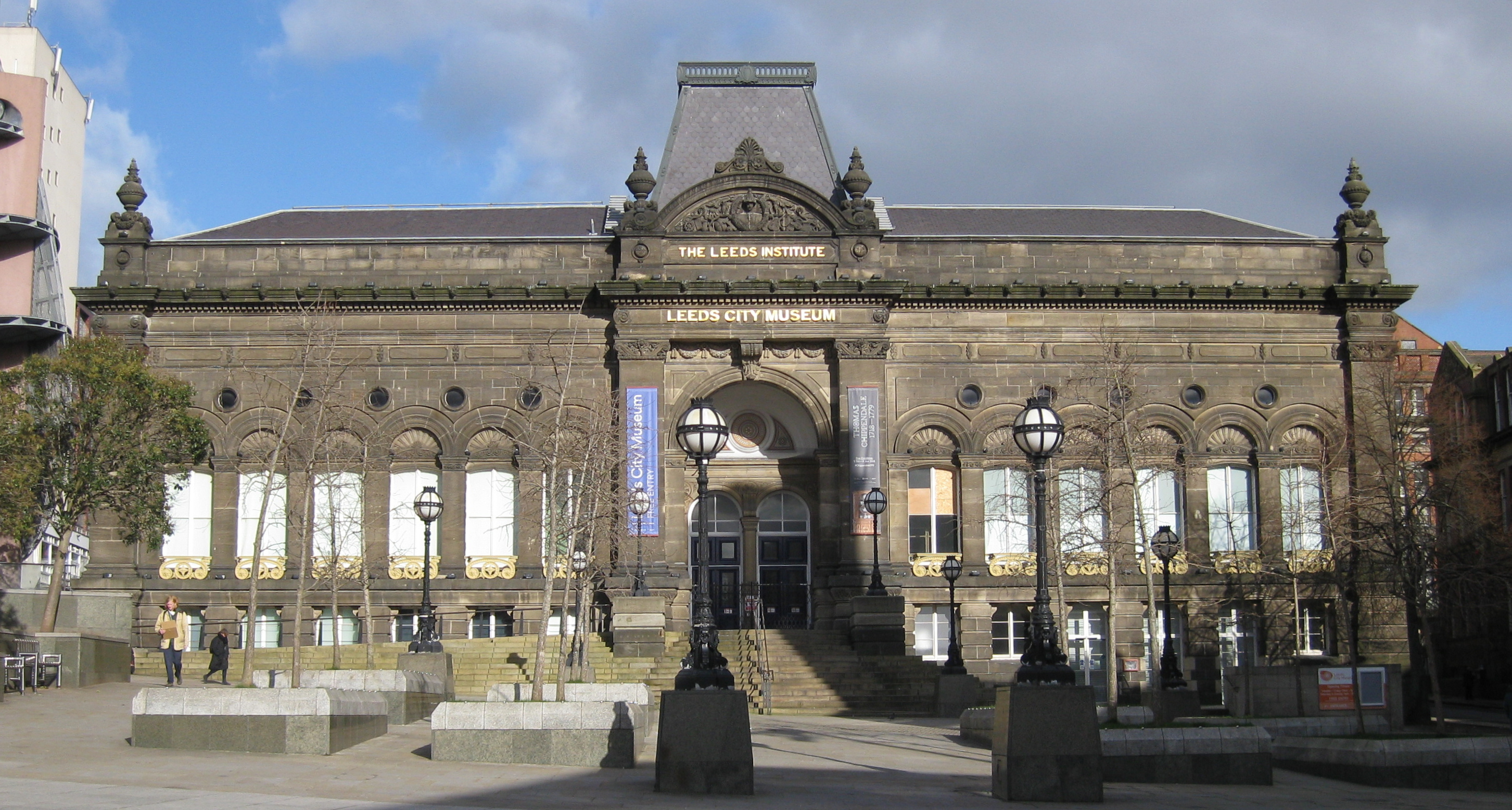
The Leeds City Mechanics' Institute's building

Mechanics' institutes, also known as mechanics' institutions, sometimes simply known as institutes, and also called schools of arts (especially in the Australian colonies), were educational establishments originally formed to provide adult education, particularly in technical subjects, to working men in Victorian-era Britain and its colonies. They were often funded by local industrialists on the grounds that they would ultimately benefit from having more knowledgeable and skilled employees. The mechanics' institutes often included libraries for the adult working class, and were said to provide them with an alternative pastime to gambling and drinking in pubs.

Many of the original institutes included lending libraries, and the buildings of some continue to be used as libraries. Others have evolved into parts of universities, adult education facilities, theatres, cinemas, museums, recreational facilities, or community halls. Few are still referred to as mechanics' institutes, but some retain the name and focus as centre of intellectual and cultural advancement. A 21st-century movement, originating in Victoria, Australia, has organised a series of conferences known as Mechanics' Institutes Worldwide Conferences, at which information and ideas for the future of mechanics' institutes are discussed.

== Origins and history ==
The foundations of the movement which created mechanics' institutes were in lectures given by George Birkbeck at the Andersonian Institute in Glasgow. His fourth annual lecture attracted a crowd of 500, and became an annual occurrence after his departure for London in 1804, leading to the eventual formation on 16 October 1821 of the first mechanics' institute in Edinburgh, the Edinburgh School of Arts (later Heriot-Watt University). Its first lecture was on chemistry, and within a month it was subscribed to by 452 men who each paid a quarterly subscription fee. This new model of technical educational institution gave classes for working men, and included libraries as well as apparatus to be used for experiments and technical education. Its purpose was to "address societal needs by incorporating fundamental scientific thinking and research into engineering solutions". The school revolutionised access to education in science and technology for ordinary people.

The first mechanics' institute in England was opened at Liverpool in July 1823.

The second institute in Scotland was incorporated in Glasgow in November 1823, built on the foundations of a group started by Birkbeck. Under the auspices of the Andersonian Institute, where Birkbeck had been chair of natural philosophy from 1799 to 1804 and instituted free lectures on arts, science and technical subjects from 1800. This mechanics' class continued to meet after he moved to London in 1804, and in 1823 they decided to formalise their organisation by incorporating themselves as the Mechanics' Institute. He was appointed director of the institute, which he had originally endowed with the sum of £3700, and held the office till his death in 1841.

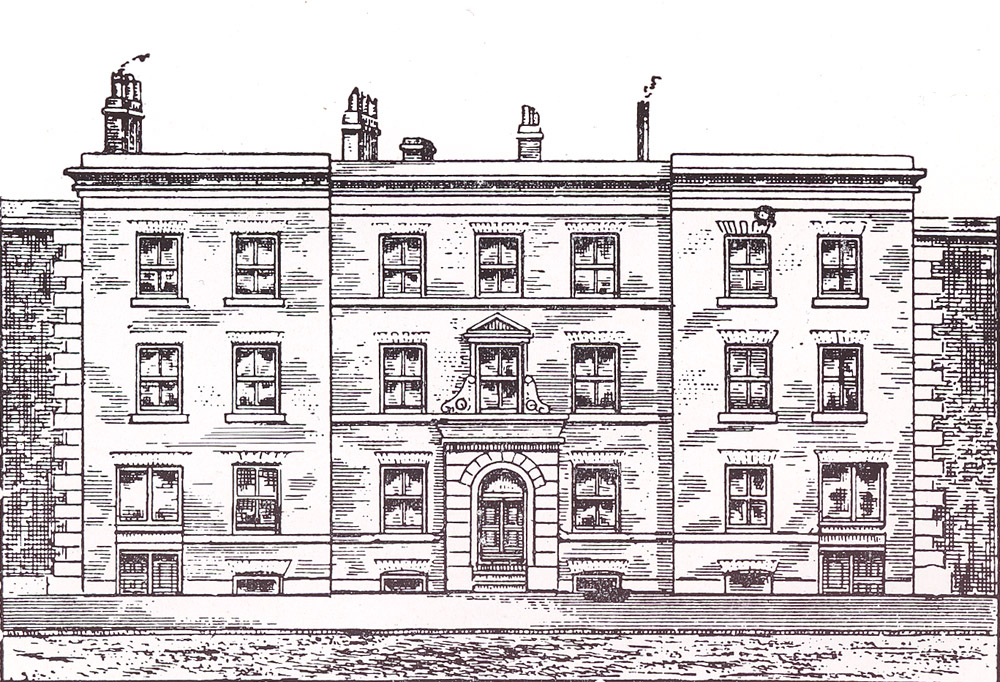
Manchester Mechanics' Institute, Cooper Street, in 1825

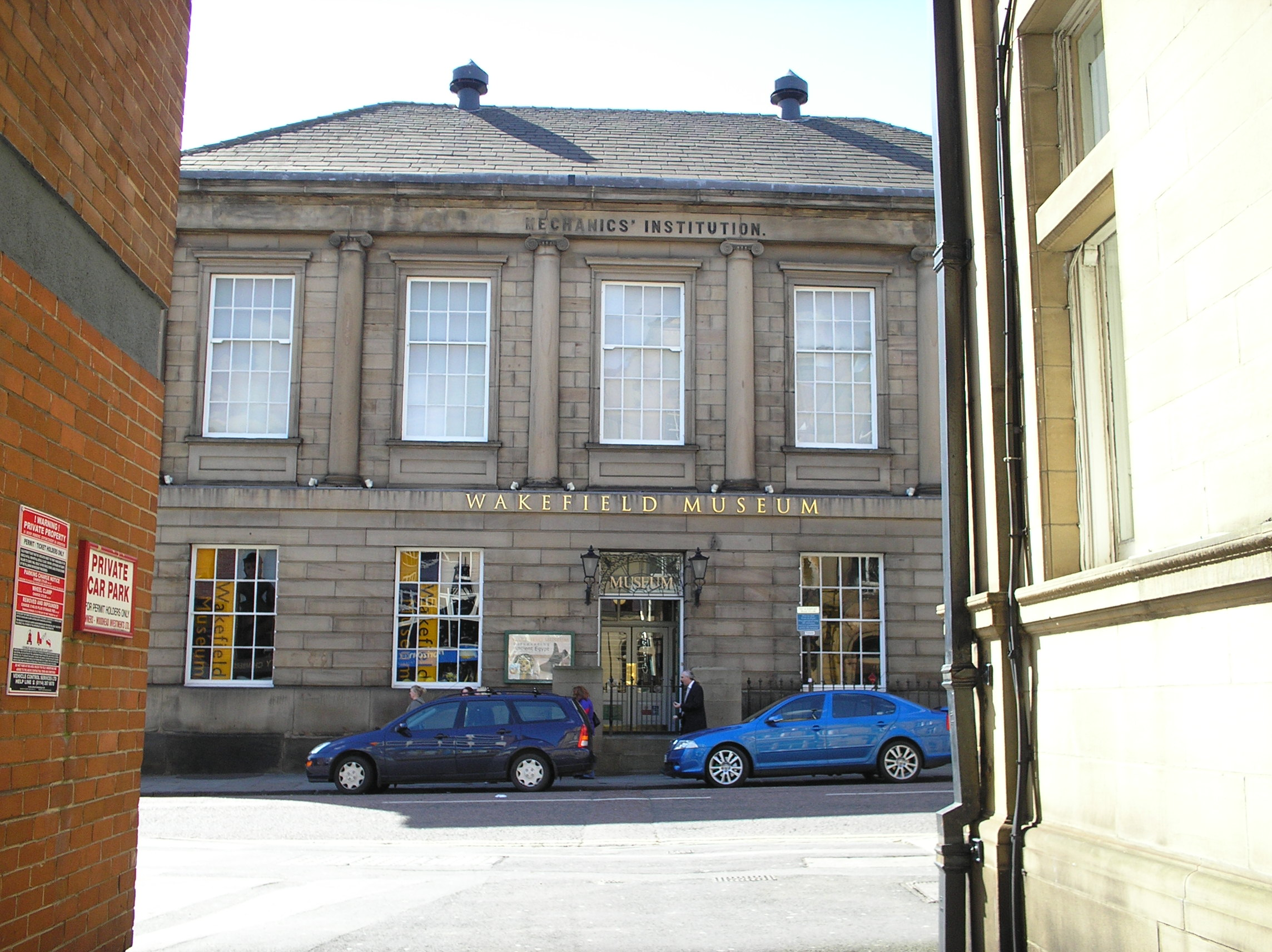
Wakefield Mechanics' Institute (1825), later a museum

The London Mechanics' Institute (later Birkbeck College) was opened in December 1823, and the mechanics' institutes in Ipswich and Manchester (later to become UMIST) in 1824. By the mid-19th century, there were over 700 institutes in towns and cities across the UK and overseas, some of which became the early roots of other colleges and universities. For example, the University of Gloucestershire, has the Cheltenham Mechanics' Institute (1834) and Gloucester Mechanics' Institute (1840) within its history timeline. It was as a result of delivering a lecture series at the Cheltenham Mechanics' Institute that the radical George Holyoake was arrested and then convicted on a charge of blasphemy.

In Australia, the first mechanics' institute was established in Hobart in 1827, followed by the Sydney Mechanics' School of Arts in 1833, Newcastle School of Arts in 1835, then the Melbourne Mechanics' Institute established in 1839 (renamed the Melbourne Athenaeum in 1872). From the 1850s, mechanics' institutes quickly spread throughout Victoria wherever a hall, library or school was needed. Over 1200 mechanics' institutes were built in Victoria and just over 500 remain today, and only six still operate their lending library services.

The Industrial Revolution created a new class of reader in Britain by the end of the 18th century, "mechanics", who were civil and mechanical engineers in reality. The Birmingham Brotherly Society was founded in 1796 by local mechanics to fill this need, and was the forerunner of mechanics' institutes, which grew in England to over seven hundred in number by 1850.

Small tradesmen and workers could not afford subscription libraries, so for their benefit, benevolent groups and individuals created mechanics' institutes that contained inspirational and vocational reading matter, for a small rental fee. Later popular non-fiction and fiction books were added to these collections. The first known library of this type was the Birmingham Artisans' Library, formed in 1823.

Some mechanics' libraries lasted only a decade or two, and many eventually became public libraries or (in the United States) were given to local public libraries after the Public Libraries Act 1850 passed. Though use of the mechanics' libraries was limited, the majority of the users were favourable towards the idea of free public libraries. However, by 1900 there were over 9,000 mechanics institutes around the world.

Beyond a lending library, mechanics' institutes also provided lecture courses, laboratories, and in some cases contained a museum for the members' entertainment and education. The Glasgow Institute, founded in 1823, not only had all three, it was also provided free light on two evenings a week from the local gas light company. The London Mechanics' Institute installed gas illumination by 1825, revealing the demand and need for members to use the books. Some mechanics' institutes also offered a programme from the arts; Wisbech Mechanics' institute booked Mrs Butler to give readings from Shakespeare's plays and Milton's Paradise Lost to audiences of nearly a thousand.

G. Jefferson explains:

The first phase, the Mechanics Institute movement, grew in an atmosphere of interest by a greater proportion of the population in scientific matters revealed in the public lectures of famous scientists such as Faraday. More precisely, as a consequence of the introduction of machinery a class workmen emerged to build, maintain and repair, the machines on which the blessing of progress depended, at a time when population shifts and the dissolving influences of industrialization in the new urban areas, where these were concentrated, destroyed the inadequate old apprentice system and threw into relief the connection between material advancement and the necessity of education to take part in its advantages.

== 21st century revival ==
Across the world, there is a move to sustain and revive mechanics' institutes and related institutions as subscription libraries, sometimes incorporating or expanding their earlier functions. There have been several worldwide conferences, known as the Mechanics' Worldwide Conference, of representatives of, or people who have an interest in, mechanics' institutes. As of 2021, there have been five such conferences:

- 2004: Buildings, Books and Beyond: Mechanics' Worldwide, at Swinburne University, Prahran, Victoria, and the Prahran Mechanics' Institute, Australia
- 2009: Self Help: Mechanics' Worldwide, at the Bath Royal Literary and Scientific Institution, Bath, Somerset, England
- 2012: Buildings, Books and Blackboards – Intersecting Narratives: Mechanics' Worldwide. RMIT University, Melbourne, Australia.
- 2016: Reinvention: Thriving in the 21st Century Mechanics' Worldwide, Mechanics' Institute, San Francisco, California, U.S.
- 2021: Mechanics' Institutes: Past, Present and Future – Mechanics' Institutes Worldwide. Heriot-Watt University, Edinburgh, Scotland, and online (due to the COVID-19 pandemic)

== By country ==
Thousands of mechanics' institutes buildings still operate throughout the world, mostly now used as libraries, parts of universities, adult education facilities, and a few still use their original names and function as a society or other type of organisation.

=== Australia ===
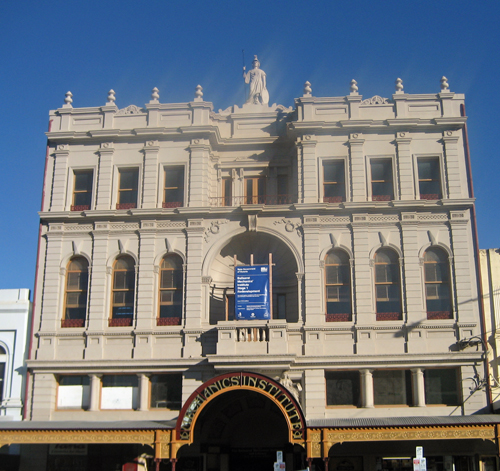
Ballarat Mechanics' Institute building

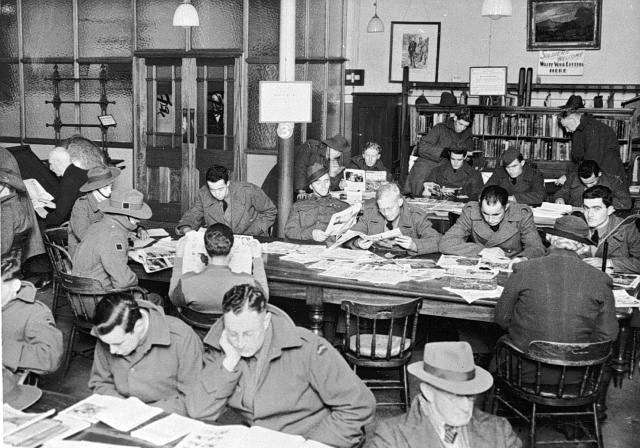
American and Australian soldiers in the reading room of the Ballarat Mechanics' Institute in 1942

In the Australian colonies, Mechanics' Institutes were often called Schools of Arts, and they were more likely to be run by the middle-classes. The provision of reading rooms, museums, lectures and classes were still important, but the Australian schools were also more likely to include a social programme in their calendar of events.

The earliest and most prominent institute in Tasmania was Van Diemen's Land Mechanics' Institution, also known as Hobart Town Mechanics' Institute, Hobart (1827–1871), co-founded by George Augustus Robinson.

The Sydney Mechanics' School of Arts (1833), in Sydney, New South Wales, is the oldest school of arts still operating and the largest institute in Australia. Others in NSW include the Moruya Mechanics' Institute and the Scone School of Arts.

In South Australia, the South Australian Institute (1838, then 1847–), was the forerunner of the State Library of South Australia, the South Australian Museum, and the Art Gallery of South Australia.

The first institute in the colony of Victoria was the Melbourne Mechanics' Institute, created in 1839. It was renamed The Melbourne Athenaeum in 1872, and continues to operate a library, theatres and shops in the original building. Many mechanics' institutes, athenaeums, schools of arts and related institutions in the state of Victoria are well documented by the Mechanics' Institutes of Victoria, Inc., whose members range from the well-resourced Melbourne Athenaeum to the tiny Moonambel Mechanics' Institute in Moonambel. In the following decades, almost every town in Victoria had a mechanics' institute, usually including a hall, library and reading rooms, games facilities, and both educational programs and entertainment.

The first Western Australian institute was the Swan River Mechanics' Institute, established in 1851, later renamed the Perth Literary Institute.

In Queensland, the Brisbane School of Arts was created in 1873, in a former servants' home. The building was added to the Queensland Heritage Register in 1992.

Over time, as local and state governments started providing libraries, community centres and other types of educational facilities, mechanics' institutes became less important in communities.

=== Canada ===
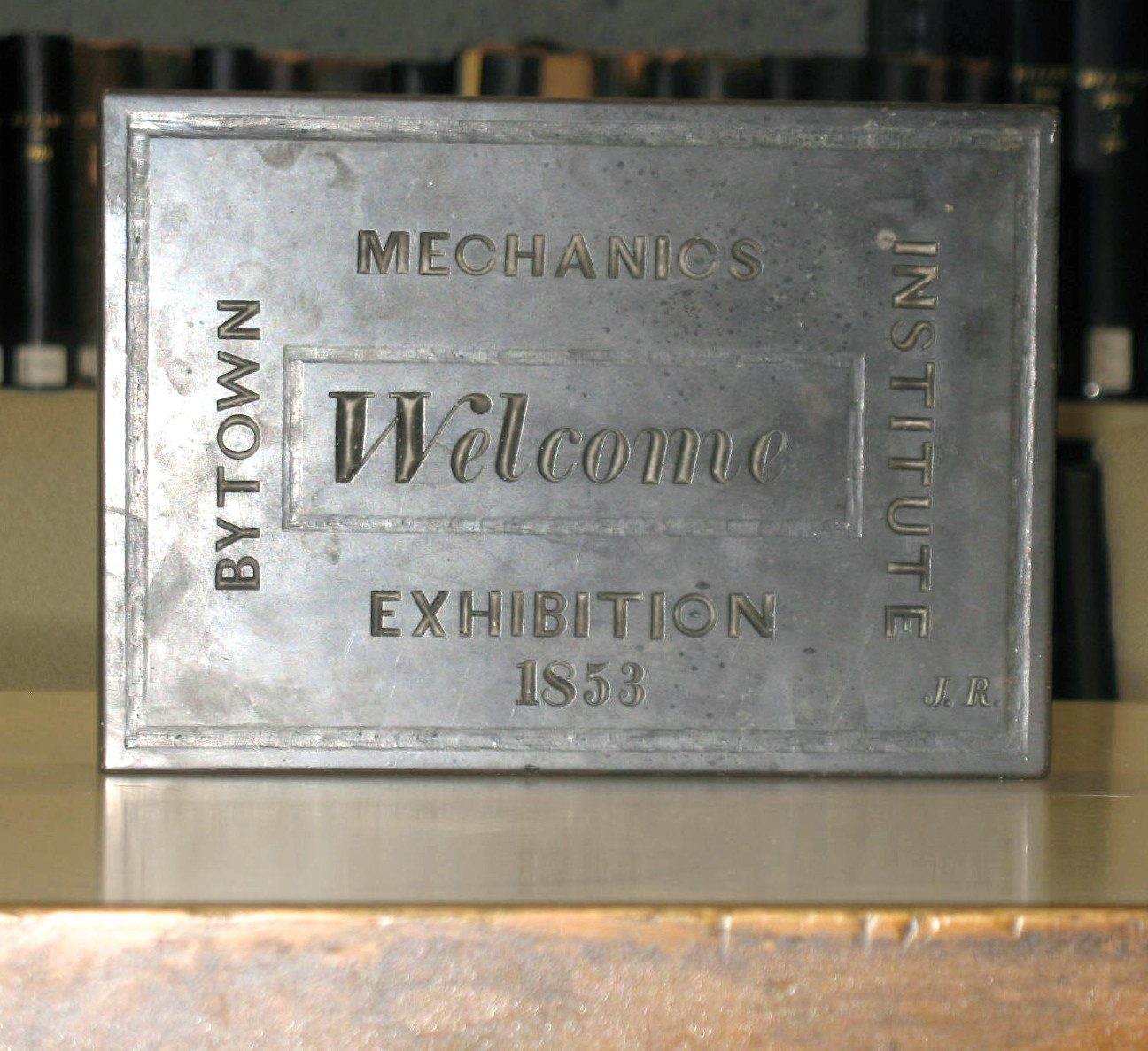
Bytown Mechanics' Institute

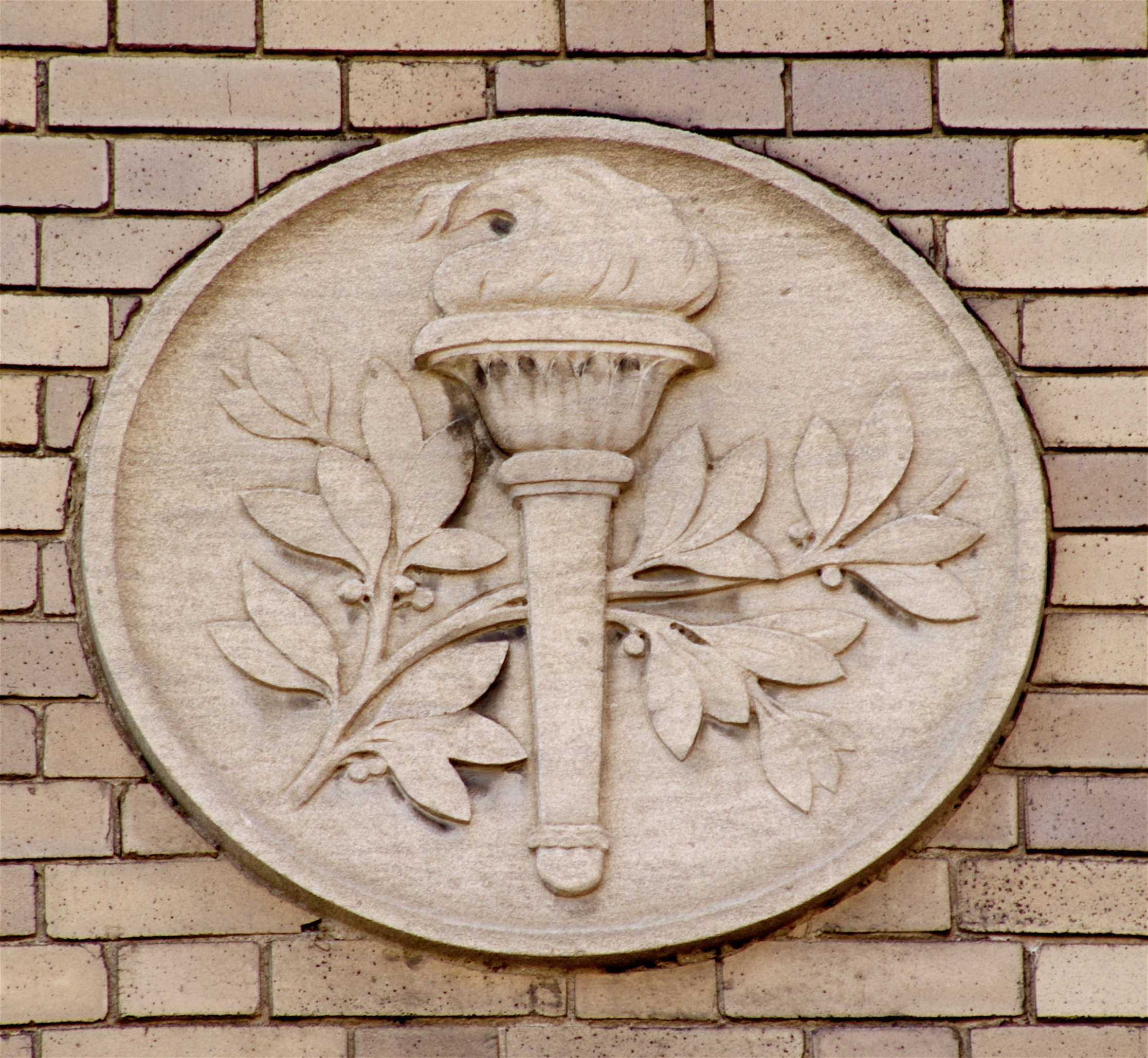
Montreal Mechanics Institute (established 1828)

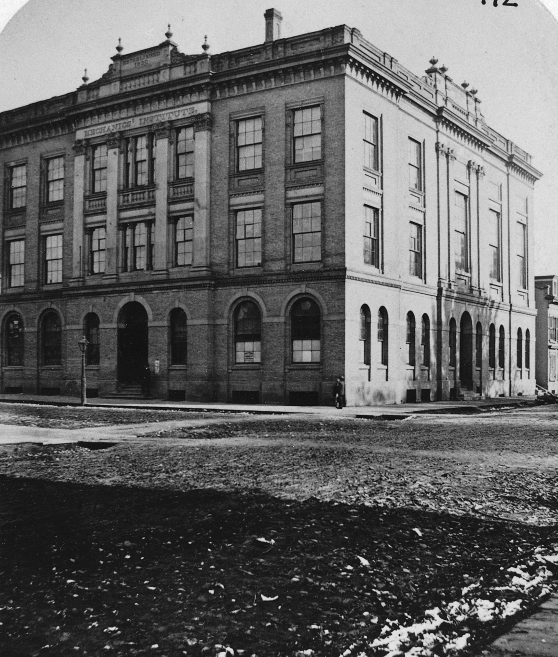
Mechanics Institute Toronto

==== Atlantic provinces ====
- Halifax Mechanics Institute
- St. John Mechanics' Institute

==== Ontario ====
- Barrie Mechanics' Institute
- Brockville Mechanics' Institute, now Brockville Public Library
- Bytown Mechanics' Institute, later Mechanics' Institute and Athenaeum of Ottawa, now Ottawa Public Library
- Elmsley Library Association and Mechanics' Institute
- Elora Mechanics' Institute
- Farmers' Mechanics' Institute of Streetsville
- Guelph Farmers' and Mechanics' Institute, now Guelph Public Library
- Hamilton and Gore Mechanics' Institute
- Kingston Mechanics' Institute
- London Mechanics' Institute
- Mechanics' Institute, Coldstream
- Mechanics' Institute (Orillia)
- Mechanics' Institute of Goderich
- Mechanics' Institute of Point Edward
- Midland Railroad Mechanics' Institute
- Napanee Mechanics' Institute
- Newmarket Farmers' Mechanics' Institute
- Owen Sound Mechanics Institute
- Peterborough Mechanics' Institute
- St. Catharines Mechanics' Institute Library
- Toronto Mechanics' Institute
- Woodstock Mechanics' Institute

==== Quebec ====
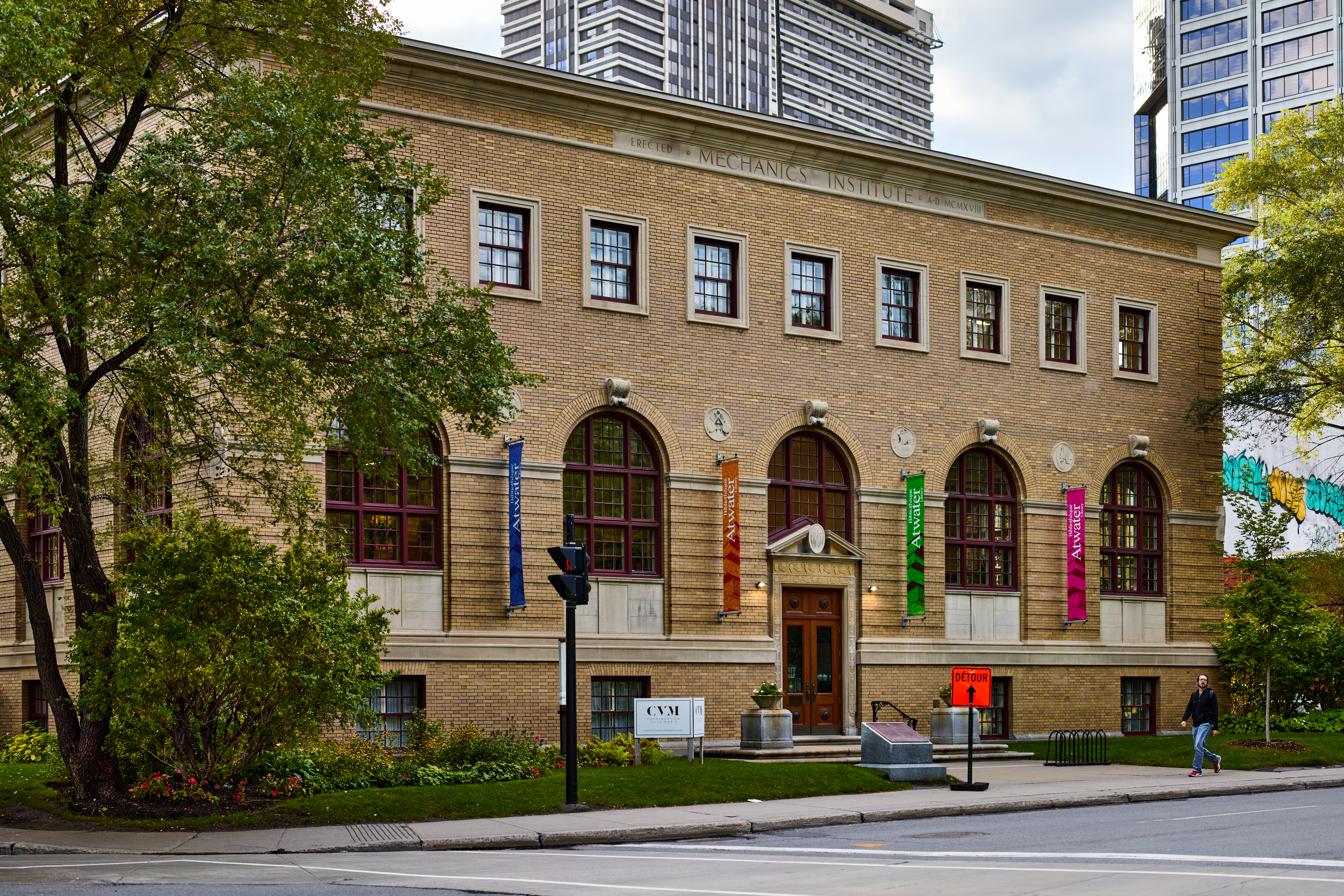
Atwater Library of the Mechanics Institute of Montreal

- Montreal Mechanics Institute
  - Atwater Library of the Mechanics' Institute of Montreal
  - Montreal Children's Library – Atwater Branch
- Quebec Mechanics' Institute

=== Hong Kong ===
- Government trade school

=== New Zealand ===
- Auckland Mechanics' Institute, founded 30 September 1842, closed 1880, with transfer of all library content to Auckland City Council library.
- Port Nicholson Mechanics' Institute, Public School and Library, founded in May 1842 and renamed Wellington Athenaeum and Mechanics' Institute in 1849.

=== United Kingdom ===
(alphabetical order by town or city)

- Aberdeen Mechanics' Institute, Market Street, Aberdeen (architect Archibald Simpson), now a hotel.
- Alford Institute. Founded 1854.
- Alnwick Mechanics' Institute, Northumberland. Founded 1824.
- Boston. Founded in 1849, became the Boston Atheneum in 1855.
- Bradford Mechanics' Institute Library, Yorkshire.
- Brechin Mechanics Institute, Angus.
- Brentford Mechanics' Institution, Middlesex. Founded in 1835 and closed around 1890.
- Burnley Mechanics, Burnley, Lancashire.
- Darlington Mechanics Institute, built in 1854, as of 2014 a nightclub and bar.
- Dysart - Mechanics Institute.
- School of Arts of Edinburgh, renamed to Heriot-Watt University in 1966.
- Epworth Mechanics Institute, North Lincolnshire.
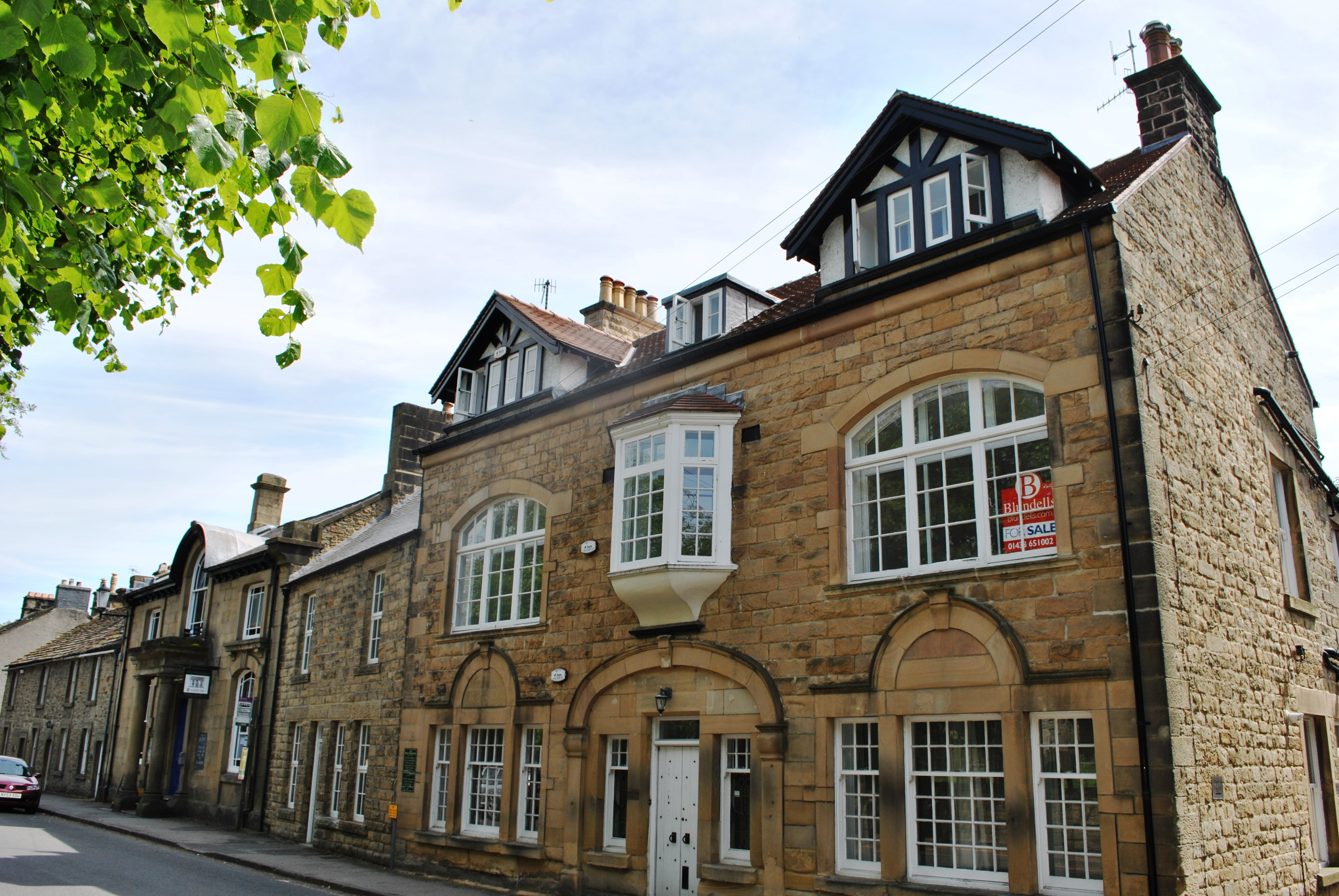
  Mechanics' Institutes, Eyam
- Eyam, Derbyshire.
- Gainsborough. Room in Gainsborough Old Hall.
- Glasgow Mechanics Institution.
- Grimsby, Lincolnshire. Founded in 1835. new building in Victoria Street in 1856.
- Ipswich Institute, Suffolk.
- Horncastle, Lincolnshire.
- Keighley Mechanics' Institute, West Yorkshire, founded 1825, developed into Keighley College
- Leeds Mechanics' Institute (West Yorkshire) designed by Cuthbert Brodrick, now Leeds City Museum.
- Lincoln Mechanics' Institute. Founded 1833 in the undercroft of the Greyfriars.
- Liverpool Mechanics School of Arts, founded 1825, renamed Liverpool Mechanics Institution in 1832, which later became the Liverpool Institute High School for Boys and from 1996 the Liverpool Institute for Performing Arts.
- London, City and Guilds of London Institute, opened in 1884 (now part of Imperial College London).
- London Mechanics' Institute which eventually became Birkbeck, University of London
- Louth, Lincolnshire, founded in 1835. Moved to Mansion House 1853.
- Lurgan, County Armagh. 69 Market Street.
- Lutterworth, Leicestershire.
- Manchester, forerunner of University of Manchester Institute of Science and Technology, which merged with Victoria University of Manchester to form the University of Manchester
- Market Rasen, Lincolnshire, founded in 1836 in Queen Street
- Marsden Mechanics Institute, Marsden, West Yorkshire, HD7 6BW, built by local millworkers in 1860, now a rental hall and public library.
- Neath Mechanics Institute, Neath, Neath Port Talbot Founded in 1842
- Newton Stewart and Minnigaff Mechanics Institution.
- University of South Wales, Newport – converted to private apartments
- Nottingham Mechanics Institute
- Otley Mechanics Institute, West Yorkshire
- Royston, Hertfordshire, built 1855, later became the town hall and picture palace
- Spitalfields Mechanics' Institution, founded in early 1825 by Thomas Gibson, father of Thomas Field Gibson
- Stamford, Lincolnshire, Stamford Institution. Founded 1842.
- Swindon Mechanics' Institute, Wiltshire
- Wakefield Mechanics' Institute, West Yorkshire
- Wolverhampton (Queen Street, c. 1835)
- Wisbech Working Men's Club & Institute, Wisbech, Isle of Ely.

=== United States ===
==== Timeline ====
- 1792 The Mechanic Library Society of New Haven, Connecticut was founded. It was chartered the following year and was eventually superseded in New Haven by The Young Men's Institute Library.
- 1795 The Massachusetts Charitable Mechanic Association of Boston, Massachusetts, was "formed for the sole purposes of promoting the mechanic arts and extending the practice of benevolence."
- 1820 General Society of Mechanics and Tradesmen of the City of New York established. Renamed and became the Mechanics' Institute in 1858.
- 1821 The English High School was established in Boston, MA, as the first public high school, with leadership from the Massachusetts Charitable Mechanic Association.
- 1824 "The Franklin Institute of the State of Pennsylvania for the Promotion of the Mechanic Arts" opened in Philadelphia.
- 1826 The Maryland Institute for the Promotion of the Mechanic Arts opened in Baltimore.
- 1827 Boston established a mechanics' institute.
- 1828 In Cincinnati, the Ohio Mechanics Institute (OMI) was founded on 20 November to "facilitate the diffusion of useful knowledge" to "ingenious artisans and mechanics".
- Richmond, Virginia – Mechanics' institute was located at 9th and Bank Streets Marshall Street properties are now part of Virginia Commonwealth University and Richmond Public Schools
- Rochester, New York – 1885 mechanics' institute merged with the Rochester Athenium in 1891 to become the Rochester Athenaeum and Mechanics Institute. Renamed to Rochester Institute of Technology (RIT) in 1944.

==== Existing names and uses ====
- General Society of Mechanics and Tradesmen of the City of New York
- Mechanics' Institute, San Francisco, California
- Mechanics Hall, Worcester
- Maine Charitable Mechanic Association
- New Haven Young Men's Institute
- Working Men's Institute (New Harmony, Indiana)

In addition, each state and territory in the US has at least one land grant university that includes a college of agriculture and a college of engineering, as provided for by the Morrill Land-Grant Acts to teach agriculture, military tactics, and the mechanic arts as well as classical studies.

== See also ==
- Athenaeum
- Cultural institutions in Australia
- Society for the Diffusion of Useful Knowledge
