= Thomas Johnson (architect) =

British architect

Thomas Johnson (c.1762–1814) was a British architect who designed the 1808 building for the Leeds Library in Leeds, West Yorkshire, England. He built William Hey's house at 1, Albion Place, Leeds, and Holy Trinity Church, Halifax. It is possible that he also worked on the redesign of the south west section of Temple Newsam House, near Leeds.

Colvin, who calls him a "competent classical architect", states that he was probably the son of the Leeds architect William Johnson (died 1795). He also suggests tentatively an identification with the Thomas Johnson admitted to the Royal Academy Schools in 1782, at age 20.
