= Burley Branch Library =

Former public library in Leeds, England

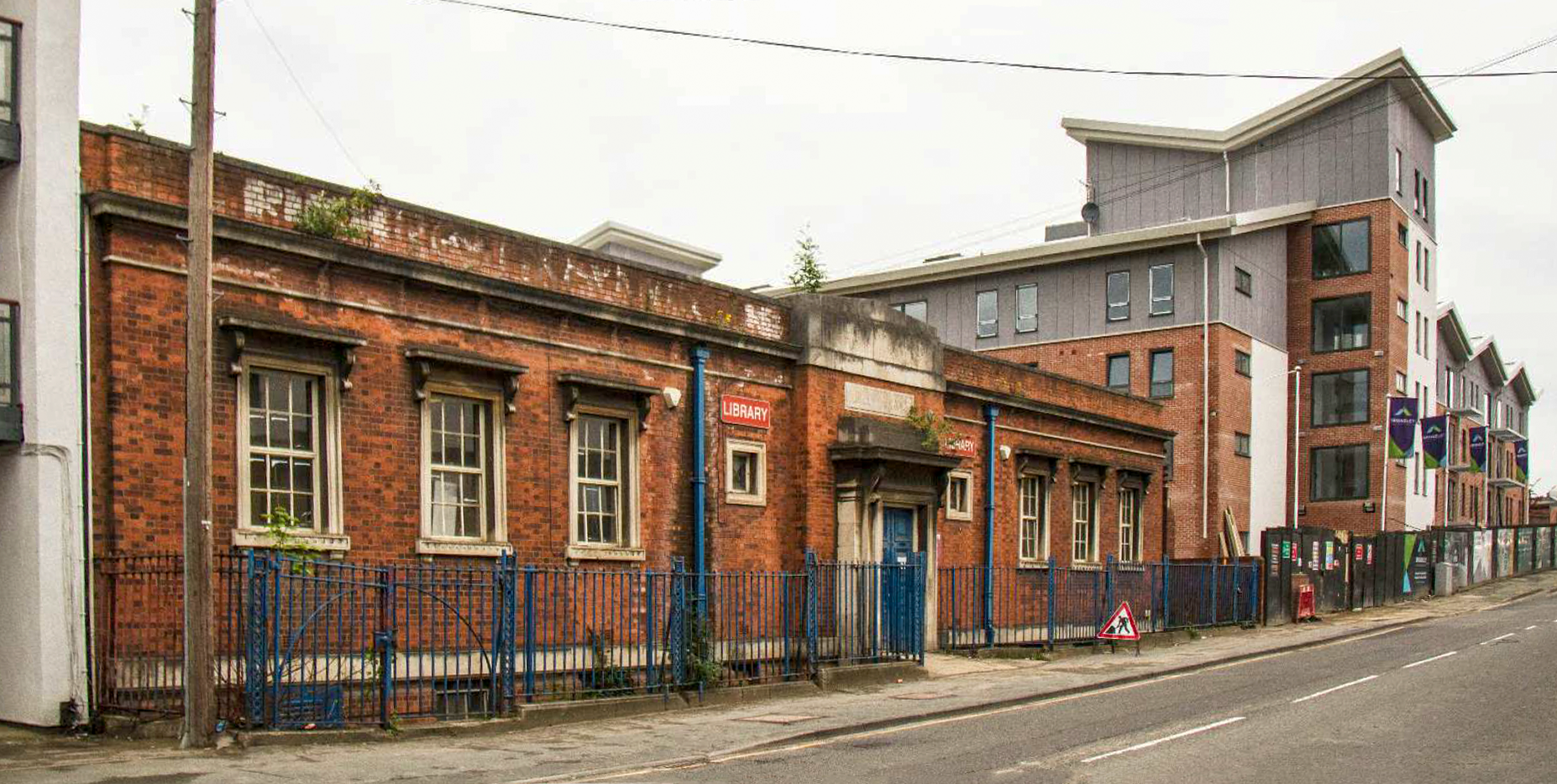
- Viewed from Cardigan Road in 2017
- 53.8078°N 1.5750°W
- Location: Burley, Leeds, West Yorkshire, United Kingdom
- Type: Public library
- Established: June 15, 1926
- Dissolved: February 2016
- Architect: Gilbert Burdett Howcroft

Listed Building – Grade II
- Designated: 23 June 2017
- Reference no.: 1440604

The Burley Branch Library was open on Cardigan Road, Burley, Leeds, West Yorkshire, between 1926 and 2016. It was established on vacant industrial land adjacent to a printing works and railway depot by Leeds City Council, and was majority financed by Carnegie. It is built to a design by Gilbert Burdett Howcroft. The Council closed the library in February 2016 due to its poor condition and being surplus to operational requirements. The building was listed at Grade II in 2017 and remains awaiting redevelopment.

== Description ==
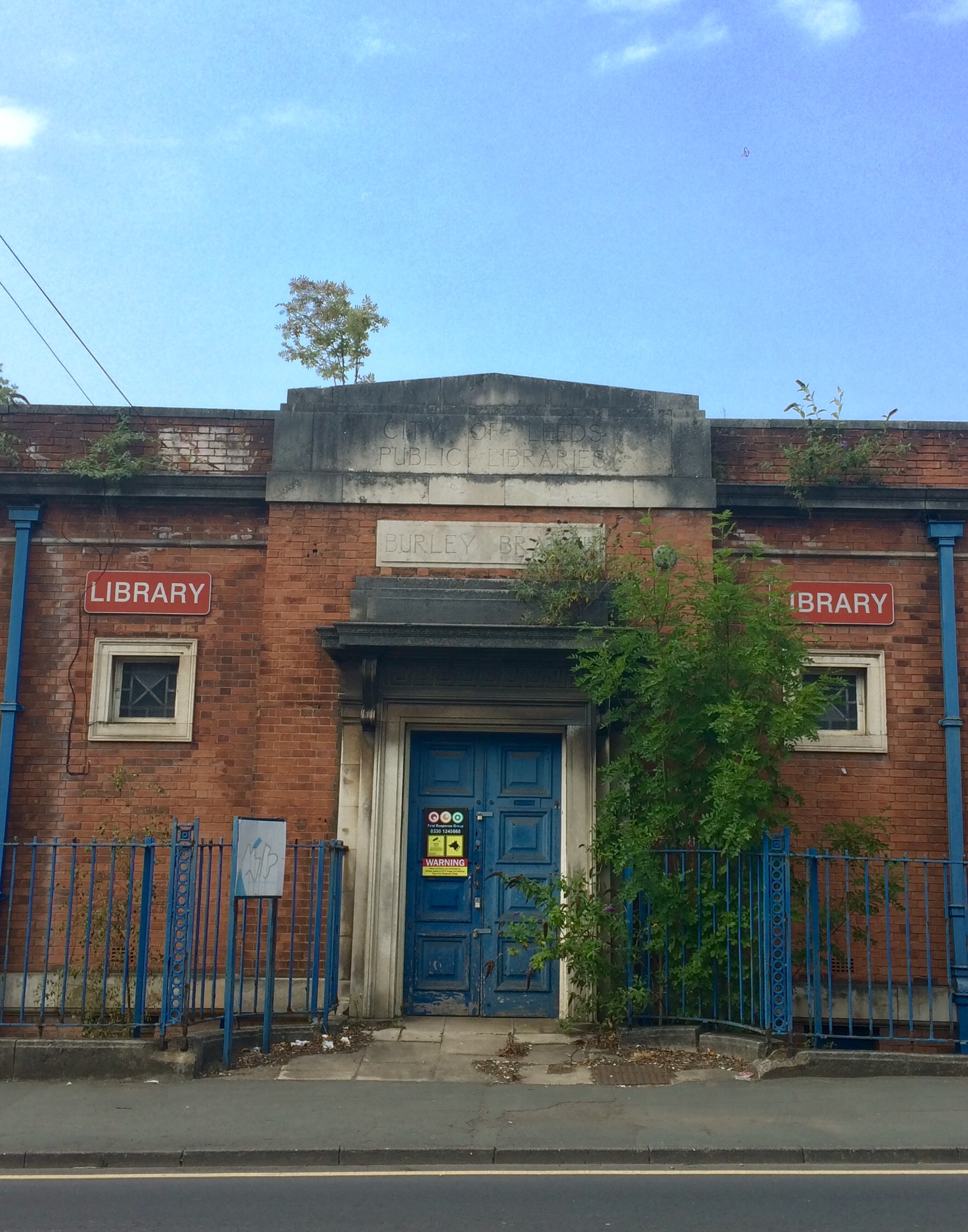
The central entrance in 2020, including entablature and pediment

The disused building is located at 230 Cardigan Road, Leeds, and is flanked by student accommodation blocks and has a railway line with former coal drops to the rear, behind which is Burley Park. The library is of a single storey and basement, constructed of a mellow red brick with Portland stone and sandstone dressings, and uses a neo-Georgian style.

The front elevation is of nine bays with a central bay that projects forward slightly to form the main entrance; square-panel double doors set within a classical doorcase with Greek key decoration and an entablature supported by carved consoles. Above the doorcase is a large stone with a carved inscription that reads 'BURLEY BRANCH', and above an Art Deco-style shallow pediment with an inscription reading 'CITY OF LEEDS/ PUBLIC LIBRARIES'. The three outer bays have windows with carved surrounds incorporating wave decoration to the sills and shallow flat hoods supported on carved consoles.

The roof features roof lanterns over the flat-roofed sections of the entrance hall, junior room and reading room, but they hidden from view from the street by a parapet with flat copings. Along the whole front are painted cast iron railings incorporating narrow sections of guilloché-style detailing, which guard access to the window well and are included in the building's heritage listing.

== History ==
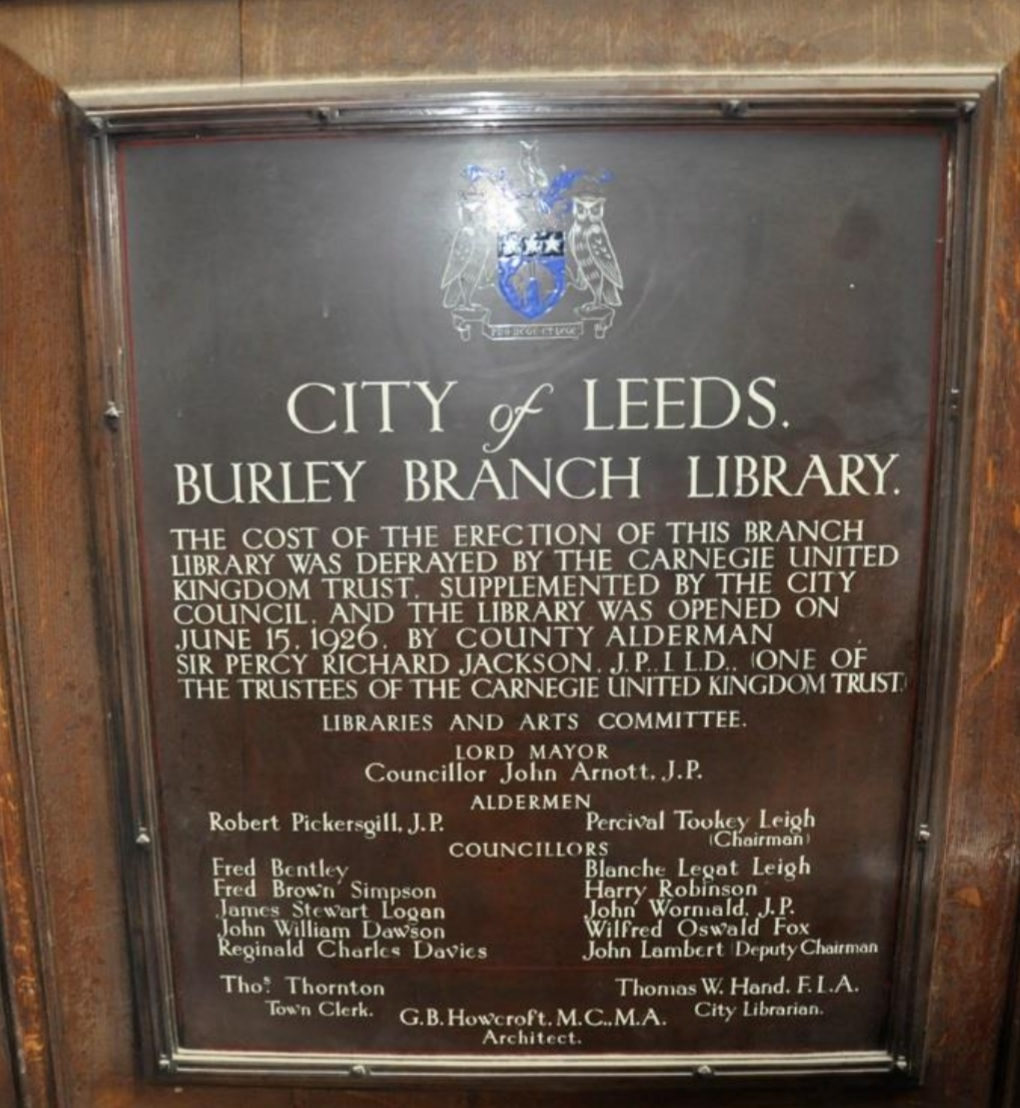
Plaque in the library's entrance hall

Burley was developed following the sale of the Cardigan estate in the 1860s. The branch library was established by the Leeds library system to serve the expanding local community. According to historical maps, the site was empty land in 1893, next to a railway depot. In 1908 the future site of the library was still vacant, although unlabelled industrial buildings had been built to the north. By 1921, a printing works was built to the south of the plot, with the future site of the library possibly forming an enclosed yard associated with the works. A contract for the construction of the library (dated March 1925) between Leeds Corporation and William Simpkiss of Lambourne and Company Ltd is held by the West Yorkshire Archive Service.

A plaque inside the library attributes its design to the architect Gilbert Burdett Howcroft of Uppermill and gives a date of 15 June 1926 for its opening by Alderman Sir Percy Jackson, Chairman of the West Riding Education Committee, and a trustee of the Carnegie United Kingdom Trust. The library cost £8,338 (equivalent to £611,300 in 2023) to construct, with most of the funding coming from the Carnegie UK Trust and the rest from Leeds Council.

The library was then in continual use until its closure by the local authority in February 2016. This was based on health and safety concerns arising from its general poor condition (especially non-compliance with fire regulations), an adjoining landowner having expressed a desire to acquire the property for incorporation with developments on adjacent sites, and the "limited potential for refurbishment or redevelopment in isolation". An August 2016 report from the authority recommended that the subject property be declared surplus to Council requirements with a view to a disposal at optimum value.

Following its closure, the library was given a Grade II listing by Historic England in June 2017. Reasons for designation were cited as the design quality ("neo-Georgian design displays a careful attention to detail that belies its tiny scale"), the survival of original internal features, and being a "well-preserved example of a small inner-city branch library".

An application for planning and listed building consent by Park Lane Group, a property developer with numerous student flats in the area, to refurbish the former library building as a co-working space and to build a five-storey rear extension of 60 co-living apartments was approved in 2019. A previous proposal to demolish the original building and erect a new five-storey residential building in its place was in development, but after the listing designation, was changed to a new design retaining the library. However, no building works have taken place as of August 2020.

== See also ==
- List of libraries in Leeds
