= Thoresby Society =

Historical society for Leeds, England

The Thoresby Society: The Leeds Historical Society is the historical society for the city of Leeds in West Yorkshire, England, and the surrounding district. It was founded in 1889 and named after the historian of Leeds, Ralph Thoresby (1658–1725).

== Name and history ==
The Society takes its name from Ralph Thoresby (1658–1725), the first historian of Leeds and a pioneer in the field of local history. It was founded in 1889 and by the end of that year had 172 subscribers. By 1912 this had grown to 397, and by 1986 reached 528. The society's activities in its first century included publication of transcriptions of local records and of original research, lectures, and "the educational and social pleasures of imaginatively organised excursions" (423 of which took place in its first 100 years).

== Activities ==
The society's activities, as of 2023, include:

- An annual programme of monthly lectures, evening and lunchtime, many of which are available on YouTube
- A series of annual publications, each related to some aspect of the history of Leeds, as listed below
- The maintenance of a Library and Archives, housed at The Leeds Library
- A programme of excursions.

== Aims ==
The objects of the Society, as set out in the Memorandum of Association, are:

To be the premier history society of Leeds and its neighbourhood and accordingly to cultivate an interest in the history of Leeds and its neighbourhood through the collection and preservation of books, documents and other matter that may assist this purpose;
To promote the dissemination of knowledge by all appropriate means of the history of Leeds and its neighbourhood and to promote a wide public interest therein;
To oversee the publication of documents, monographs and papers relating to the history of Leeds and its neighbourhood.

== Library and archives ==
The Society maintains a large library of books relating to the history of Leeds and District, and conserves an archive of papers and images relating to Leeds.

A catalogue of the Society's archive holdings may be accessed from its webpage, along with specific catalogues of maps and plans, sales particulars, abstracts of title, images, and ephemera.

The Society's Library was moved in 2015 into the Leeds Library, where it is available for public access.

== List of publications ==
Digitised versions of the First Series publications, and information about Second Series publications, can be accessed from the Society's website.

=== First series ===
- I Leeds Parish Church Registers, First and Second Books, 1572–1612; ed. by Samuel Margerison; 1891
- II Miscellanea I; 1891
- III Leeds Parish Church Registers, Third and Fourth Books, 1612–1639; ed. by G. D. Lumb; 1895
- IV Miscellanea II; ed. by E. Kitson Clark; 1895
- V Adel Parish Church Registers, 1606–1812, and Monumental Inscriptions; ed. by G. D. Lumb; 1895
- VI Calverley Charters presented to the British Museum by Sir Walter Calverley Trevelyan, Baronet, Volume I. Transcribed by S. Margerison and ed. by W. Paley Baildon and S. Margerison; 1904
- VII Leeds Parish Church Registers, 1639–1667, Fifth and Sixth Books; ed. by, G. D. Lumb; 1897
- VIII Coucher Book of the Cistercian Abbey of Kirkstall, in W.R.Yorks, (Note: Book containing partial records of the grants of land to Kirkstall Abbey, which were retained among the records of the Duchy of Lancaster in Lancaster Place, London.) Printed from the Original Preserved in the Public Record Office; ed. by W. T. Lancaster and W. Paley Baildon; 1904
- IX Miscellanea III; ed. by E. Kitson Clark; 1899
- X Leeds Parish Church Registers, 1667–1695, Seventh and Eighth Books; ed. by G. D. Lumb; 1901
- XI Miscellanea IV; ed. by E. Kitson Clark; 1904
- XII Methley Parish Church Registers, 1560–1812; transcribed and ed. by G. D. Lumb; 1903
- XIII Leeds Parish Church Registers, 1695–1722, Ninth and Tenth Books, with Armley Chapel, 1695–1711, and Hunslet Chapel, 1686–1724; ed. by G. D. Lumb; 1909
- XIV Leeds Grammar School Admission Books, 1820–1900; ed. and annotated by Edmund Wilson; 1906
- XV Miscellanea V; ed. by B. P. Scattergood; 1909
- XVI Architectural Description of Kirkstall Abbey; by W. H. St. John Hope and John Bilson; 1907
- XVII History of the Parish of Barwick-in-Elmet; by F. S. Colman; 1908
- XVIII Place-Names of the West Riding of Yorkshire; investigated by F. W. Moorman; 1910
- XIX Testamenta Leodiensia; Wills of Leeds, Pontefract, Wakefield, Otley and District, 1539–1553; extracted and ed. by G. D. Lumb; 1913
- XX Leeds Parish Church Registers, 1722–1757, Eleventh and Twelfth Books: ed. by G.D. Lumb; 1914
- XXI Letters Addressed to Ralph Thoresby, printed from the originals in the possession of the Yorkshire Archaeological Society; ed. by W. T. Lancaster; 1912
- XXII Miscellanea VI; ed. by G. D. I.umb; 1915
- XXIII Registers of the Chapels of the Parish Church of Leeds. 1724–1703, with a few earlier years (St. John's, Holy Trinity, Armley, Beeston, Bramley, Chapel Allerton, Farnley, Headingley, Holbeck and Hunslet), First and Second Books; transcribed and ed. by G. D. Lumb; 1916
- XXIV Miscellanea VII; ed. by G. D. Lumb; 1919
- XXV Leeds Parish Church Registers: Baptisms and Burials, 1757–1776 (Thirteenth and Fourteenth Books); Marriages, 1754–1769; transcribed by J. Singleton; ed. by J. Singleton and Miss Emily Hargrave; 1923
- XXVI Miscellanea VIII ed. by G. D. Lumb; 1924
- XXVII Testamenta Leodiensia; Wills of Leeds. Pontefract, Wakefield, Otley and District, 1553–1561; extracted and ed. by G. D. Lumb; 1930. Part1 1919, Part 2 1921
- XXVIII Miscellanea IX; ed. by G. D. Lumb; 1928
- XXIX Registers of the Chapels of St. John, Holy Trinity, Headingley, Bramley, Beeston, Chapel Allerton and Farnley, all in the Parish of Leeds, 1763–1812, and in some cases later years; ed, by G. P. Lumb; 1928
- XXX History and Description of the Priory of St. Mary, Bolton-in-Wharfedale, with some Account of the Canons Regular of the Order of St. Augustine and their Houses in Yorkshire; by A. Hamilton Thompson; 1928
- XXXI Registers of the Chapels of the Parish Church of Leeds, 1764–1812: Holbeck, Armley and Hunslet; ed. by G. D. Lumb; 1934
- XXXII Leeds Woollen Industry, 1780–1820; ed. by W. B. Crump; 1931
- XXXIII Miscellanea X; ed. by G. D. Lumb; 1935
- XXXIV Court Books of the Leeds Corporation: First Book, 1662–1705; transcribed by J. G.Clark; 1936
- XXXV History of Methley: ed. by H S. Darbyshire and G. D. Lumb; 1937
- XXXVI Parish Register of Aberford, 1510–1812; transcribed and ed. by G. D. Lumb; 1937
- XXXVII Miscellany XI; ed. by G. D. Lumb and W. B. Crump. 1945.
- XXXVIII Extracts from The Leeds Intelligencer and The Leeds Mercury, 1769–1776: ed. by G. D, Lumb. 1938.
- XXXIX. Yorkshire fairs and markets, to the end of the eighteenth century; by K, L. McCutcheon. 1940.
- Mon. I. Thomas Taylor: Regency architect, Leeds; by F. Beckwith. 1949.
- Mon. II. A survey of the plate of Leeds Parish Church and its ancient chapelries; by J. Sprittles. 1951.
- Mon. III. Social reform in Victorian Leeds: the work of James Hole, 1820–1895; by J. F. C. Harrison. 1954.
- XL. Extracts from The Leeds Intelligencer and The Leeds Mercury, 1777–1782; ed. by G. D. Lumb and J. B. Place; with an introductory account of The Leeds Intelligencer, 1754–1866, by F. Beckwith, 1955.
- XLI. Miscellany XII. 1954.
- XLII. The Kirkstall Abbey chronicles; ed. by John Taylor. 1952.
- XLIII. Kirkstall Abbey excavations, 1950–1954. 1955.
- XLIV. Extracts from The Leeds Intelligencer, 1791–1796; ed. by G. D. Lumb. 1956.
- XLV. Documents relating to the manor and borough of Leeds, 1066–1400; ed. by John Le Patourel. 1957.
- XLVI. Miscellany XIII. 1963.
- XLVII. Printed maps and plans of Leeds, 1711–1900; compiled by K. J. Bonser and H. Nichols, 1960.
- XLVIII. Kirkstall Abbey excavations, 1955–1959. 1961.
- XLIX. Pontefract Priory excavations, 1957–1961; by C. V. Bellamy. 1965.
- L. Miscellany XIV. 1968.
- LI. Kirkstall Abbey excavations, 1960–1964, with appraisal of results since 1950. 1967.
- LII. Links with Bygone Leeds, by J. Sprittles. 1969.
- LIII. Miscellany 15. 1971–73.
- LIV. Miscellany 16. 1974–79.
- LV. Leeds and the Oxford Movement, by Nigel Yates. 1975.
- LVI. Miscellany 17. 1979–81.
- LVII. The Manor and Borough of Leeds, 1425–1662: an edition of documents, edited by J. W. Kirby. 1983.
- LVIII. Kirkstall Abbey, 1147–1539: an historical study, by Guy D. Barnes.1984.
- LIX. Miscellany 18. 1985–86.
- LX-LXI. East End, West End: the face of Leeds during urbanisation, 1684–1842, by Maurice W. Beresford. 1988.
- LXII. The Georgian Public Buildings of Leeds and the West Riding, by Kevin Grady. 1989.
- LXIII. Miscellany 19. 1990.
- LXIV. CENTENARY EDITION 1989 MISCELLANY Leeds in the seventeenth and early eighteenth centuries

=== Second Series ===
- 1. Miscellany. 1991.
- 2. R. D. Chantrell, Architect: his life and work in Leeds, 1818–1847, by Christopher Webster. 1992. ISBN 9780900741272
- 3. Miscellany. 1993.
- 4. Miscellany. 1994.
- 5. Miscellany. 1995.
- 6. The Fawkes Family and their Estates in Wharfedale, 1819–1936, by Marion Sharples. 1997. ISBN 9780900741449
- 7. Church Architecture in Leeds, 1700–1799, by Terry Friedman. 1997. ISBN 9780900741494
- 8. Miscellany. 1998.
- 9. The Moravian Settlement at Fulneck, 1742–1790, by Geoffrey Stead. 1999. ISBN 9780900741555
- 10. Miscellany. 2000. index to vols lii–lxiv; second series vols 1–14 3
- 11. Miscellany. 2001.
- 12. Anglican Resurgence under W. F. Hook in Early Victorian Leeds: Church Life in a Nonconformist Town, 1836–1851, by Harry W. Dalton. 2002. ISBN 9780900741609
- 13. Miscellany. 2003.
- 14. Miscellany. 2004.
- 15. More Annals of Leeds 1880–1920. William Benn. 2005 ISBN 9780900741630
- 16. The Memoranda Book of John Lucas 1712–1750. 2006 ISBN 9780900741647
- 17. The Monuments of the Parish Church of St Peter-at-Leeds, by Margaret Pullan, 2007 ISBN 9781905981526
- Leeds in Maps Leeds Library and Information Service, The Thoresby Society, Yorkshire Evening Post. 2007
- 18. Miscellany. 2008 ISBN 9780900741678
- 19. Miscellany. 2009 ISBN 9780900741685
- 20. Miscellany. 2010 ISBN 9780900741692
- 21. The Thursby Manuscripts. ed. Peter Meredith. 2011 ISBN 9780900741708
- 22. Headingley-cum-Burley c.1544–c.1784. John Cruikshank. 2012 ISBN 9780900741722
- 23. The Burial Ground Problem in Leeds, c.1700–1914. Jim Morgan. 2013 ISBN 9780900741739
- 24. Miscellany. 2014 ISBN 9780900741746
- 25. The Notebooks of Robert Pounder. ed. Ann Alexander 2015 ISBN 9780900741753
- Ducatus Tercentenary
  - Volume One – A Celebration of Ralph Thoresby 2015.
  - Volume Two – Ralph Thoresby's Review of his Life, 1658–1714 ed. Peter Meredith. 2015
- 26. Voices from Wartime Leeds: Three Mass Observation Diaries ed. Patricia & Robert Malcolmson ISBN 9780900741784
- 27 & 28 Libraries in Leeds: A Historical Survey 1152 – c.1939. Peter Morrish, 2019
- 29. Miscellany. 2019 ISBN 9780900741807
- 30. Miscellany. 2020 ISBN 9780900741814
- 31. Knowing One's Place: Community and Class in the Industrial Suburbs of Leeds during the Eighteenth and Nineteenth Centuries, Robin Pearson, 2022. ISBN 978-0-900741-82-1
- 32. Tudor Palaces of Lord Darcy of the North: Temple Newsam and Temple Hirst, Peter Brears, 2023. ISBN 978-0-900741-83-8
- 33. Miscellany. 2023 ISBN 9780900741845
- 34. The Leeds Bantams: A Testimony of the Great War, edited by Chris Hindle, 2024, ISBN 978-0-900741-85-2
- 35. Ralph Thoresby and His Legacy, edited by Chris Hindle and Peter Meredith, 2025, ISBN 978-0-900741-86-9
