= Leeds City Library =

Library in Leeds, England

Coordinates: 53.8001°N 1.5481°W

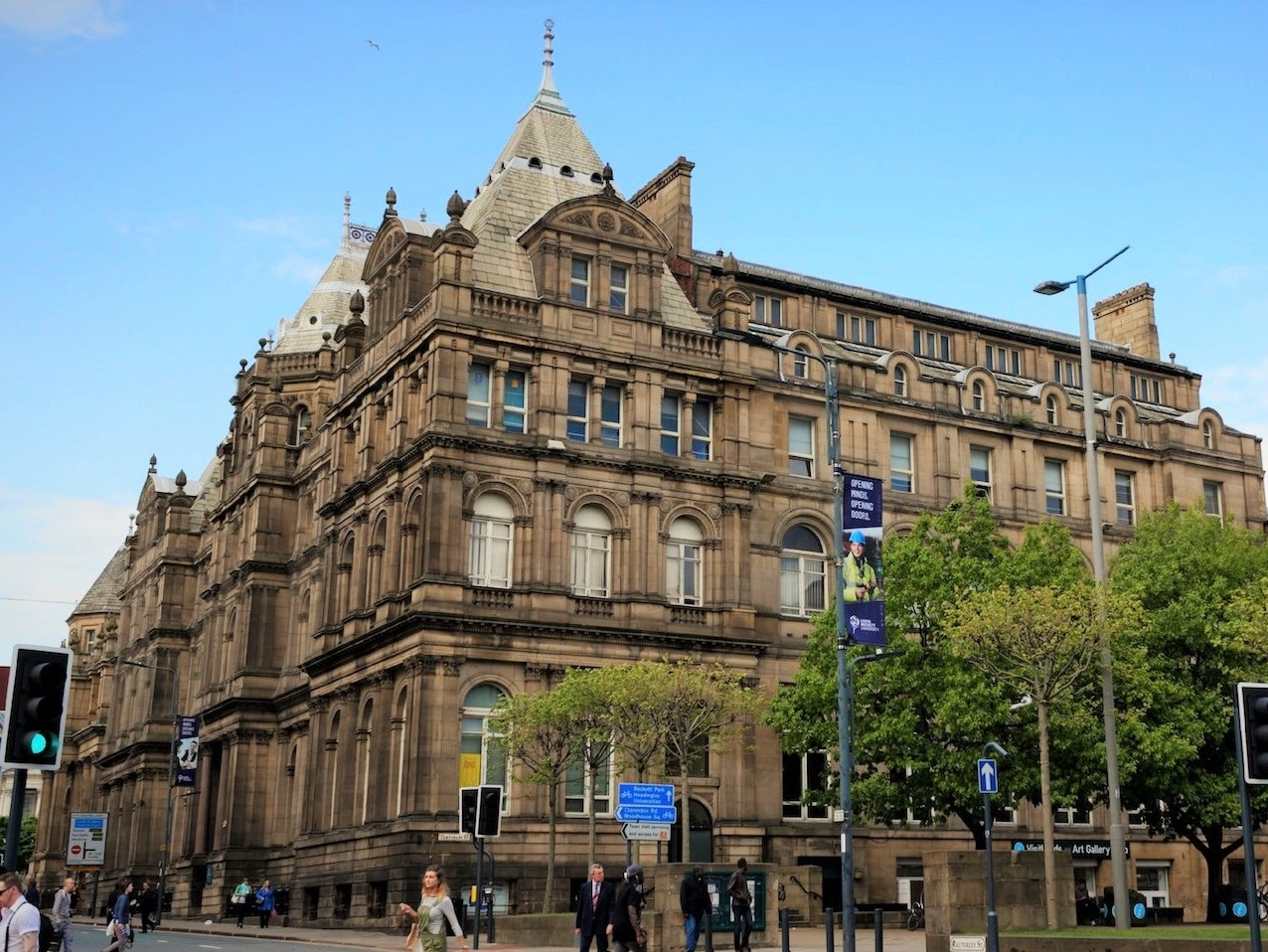
- Leeds City Library from The Headrow
- Interactive map of the Leeds City Library area

General information
- Status: Open
- Type: Public library
- Architectural style: Italianate
- Location: Leeds, England
- Construction started: 1878
- Completed: 1884
- Opened: 17 April 1884
- Client: Leeds City Council

Design and construction
- Architect: George Corson
- Designations: Grade II* listed

Website
- leeds.gov.uk/libraries/central-library

Leeds City Library, previously Leeds Central Library, is a public library in Leeds. Situated in the city centre, on Calverley Street, it houses the city library service's single largest general lending and reference collection and hosts the Leeds Art Gallery.

Services available from the building include an Art Library, a Central Children's Library, a Central Lending Library, a Business and IP Centre, a Local and Family History Library and a Music Library.

== History ==
Leeds City Library, previously known as Leeds Central Library, is a Grade II* listed building and was constructed between 1878 and 1884. The building was opened on 17 April 1884 by the Mayor, Alderman Edwin Woodhouse as the Leeds Municipal Offices. It was intended that various scattered borough departments would be accommodated in the building so that the administration of Leeds would be concentrated in the Municipal Offices and the Town Hall. A design competition was held to choose a design for the building. There were 26 entries and the winning architect was a Leeds man of Scottish origin – George Corson. He said:

I determined that the new buildings adjacent to the Town Hall would be similar in style to the Town Hall but not identical in treatment.

Corson's plans included dividing the buildings into a "business" side, which fronted on Calverley Street, and the "popular" side which led onto Centenary Street (now the Headrow). The "popular" side was occupied by the Free Public Library and took up less than a third of the whole building. This consisted of a Reading Room (currently the Tiled Hall cafe) on the ground floor, a lending library on the 1st floor and Reference Library on the 2nd floor. The "business" side was represented on the ground floor by the large pay office (currently the Central Lending Library) where local people came to settle their gas, water and rates bills. The borough engineer and the sanitary departments were on the first and second floors respectively. The total cost of the building was estimated in the region of £120,000 (approximately £6 million today). On 3 October 1888 the Mayor, Alderman Archibald Witham Scarr (1827–1904) opened the new Art Gallery extension, designed by William Henry Thorp (1852–1944). The Tiled Hall, formerly the Reading Room, was then converted to a sculpture gallery and the Reading Room was transferred to the Art Gallery and renamed the News Room. The Commercial and Technical Library was established in the News Room in 1918, but in cramped conditions. In 1955 it moved into the Tiled Hall. The Commercial and Technical Library was then able to expand and have both a lending and a reference collection.

A gallery for staff use was also created in the Tiled Hall where further book stock was shelved and work space was created for the typists from the cataloguing department. The ceiling and walls of the Tiled Hall were then hidden for nearly fifty years behind a false ceiling, bookcases and panelling. The Music Library was moved into the Tiled Hall space in 1998 but was only there until 1999, when the City Library building closed for refurbishment and rewiring. The 1950s panelling and bookcases were removed, along with the false ceiling, to once more reveal the Tiled Hall and the inevitable damage caused by work done in the 1950s.

The present restoration work has now fully restored the Tiled Hall to its original magnificence, after a £1.5 million refurbishment of the gallery and the adjacent Art Gallery. The renovation was completed in June 2007, including opening up the magnificent Victorian tiled hall (used as a café and bookshop) which links the gallery and the library. At first floor level there is direct access from the gallery to the Art Library.

== Architecture ==
=== Exterior ===
The building was constructed of Yorkshire stone from the local quarries at Dacre Bank, Harehills, Meanwood and Weetwood. Corson was a perfectionist and instructed the contractors in how to dress and lay the stones to minimise weathering. The roof is made of Westmoreland slate. The entrance steps are made of Shap granite; a tough, slip proof material commonly used for kerb edges in Leeds. The exterior columns are also made of granite and it would have taken much work to get them perfectly smooth. The exterior stone carving is by Benjamin Payler and Matthew Taylor of Leeds.

=== Calverley Street: entrance hall and stairwell ===
The Calverley Street entrance was originally the main entrance to council offices. The foyer pillars are Devonshire marble and the internal doors leading from the entrance to the foyer have alabaster and marble surrounds on the entrance side. The alabaster arch was created by Farmer & Brindley of London. Foundation stones are set above those same inner entrance doors. In the stairwell area itself the carved areas are made of limestone from Caen in Normandy, as this limestone is softer than English limestone and was easier for the stonemasons to carve. This also meant that it was more fragile and liable to damage. The stairwell area pillars are made of Devonshire marble and there are beautiful stained glass windows, though unfortunately their provenance is unknown. The windowsills are made of Devonian marble, the same material as the seats on the stairways. The blue and white tiles with a floral motif are made by Smith and Co., of Coalville. The blue and white tiles near the lift are by Minton, Hollins and Co. The brown tiled border was probably supplied by Maw and Co.

=== Central Lending Library ===
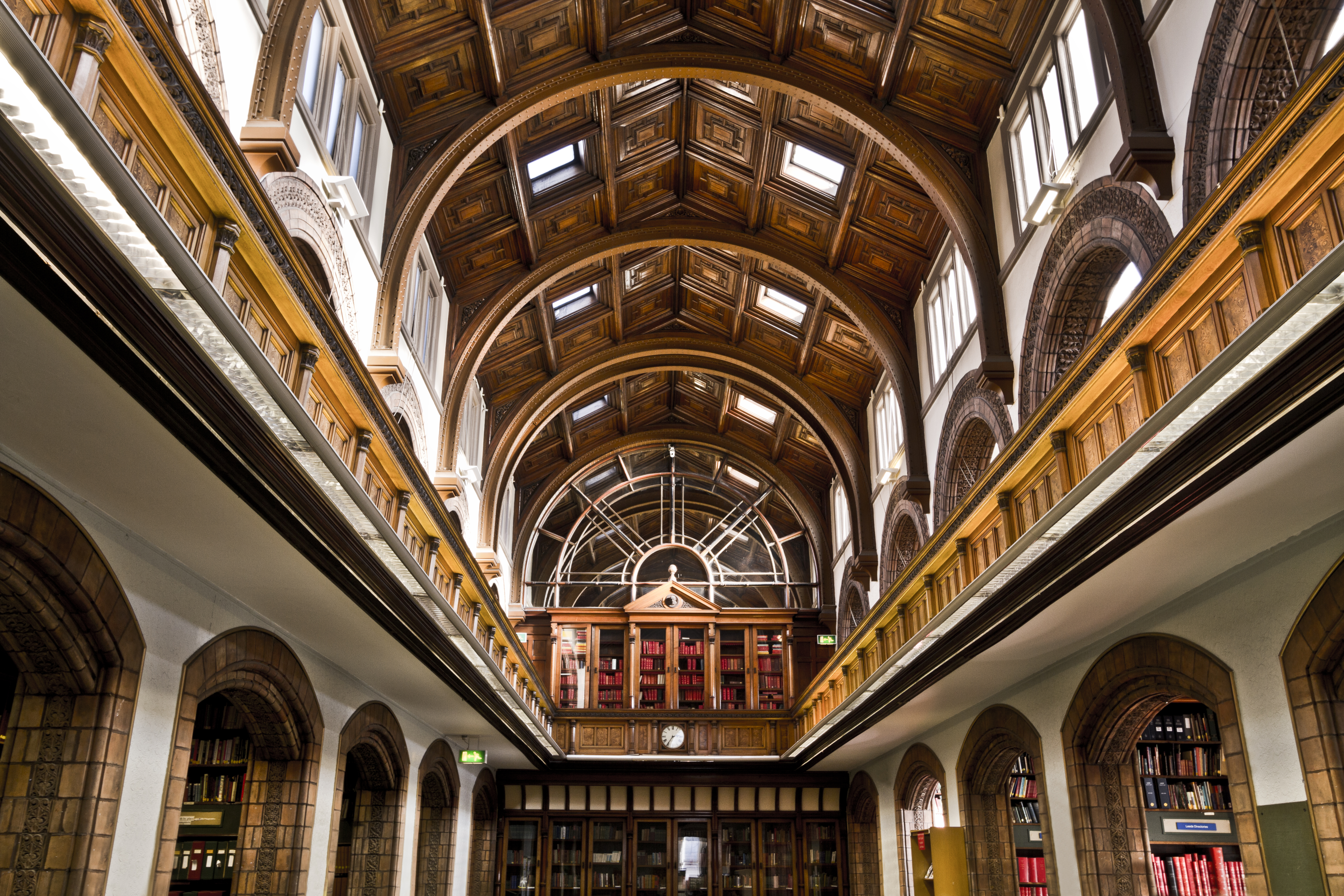
The Local & Family History Library

The current Central Lending Library was originally the office where people went to pay their rates, gas and water bills. The pay office measured 78 ft by 38 ft and had a counter 62 ft long; the central portion for the Water Department, the right side for the Rates Department and the left side for the Gas Department. Beyond the counter was a row of double desks to seat clerks. There are still original Victorian tiles on the wall and it is hoped these will be restored in the future.

=== The Tiled Hall ===
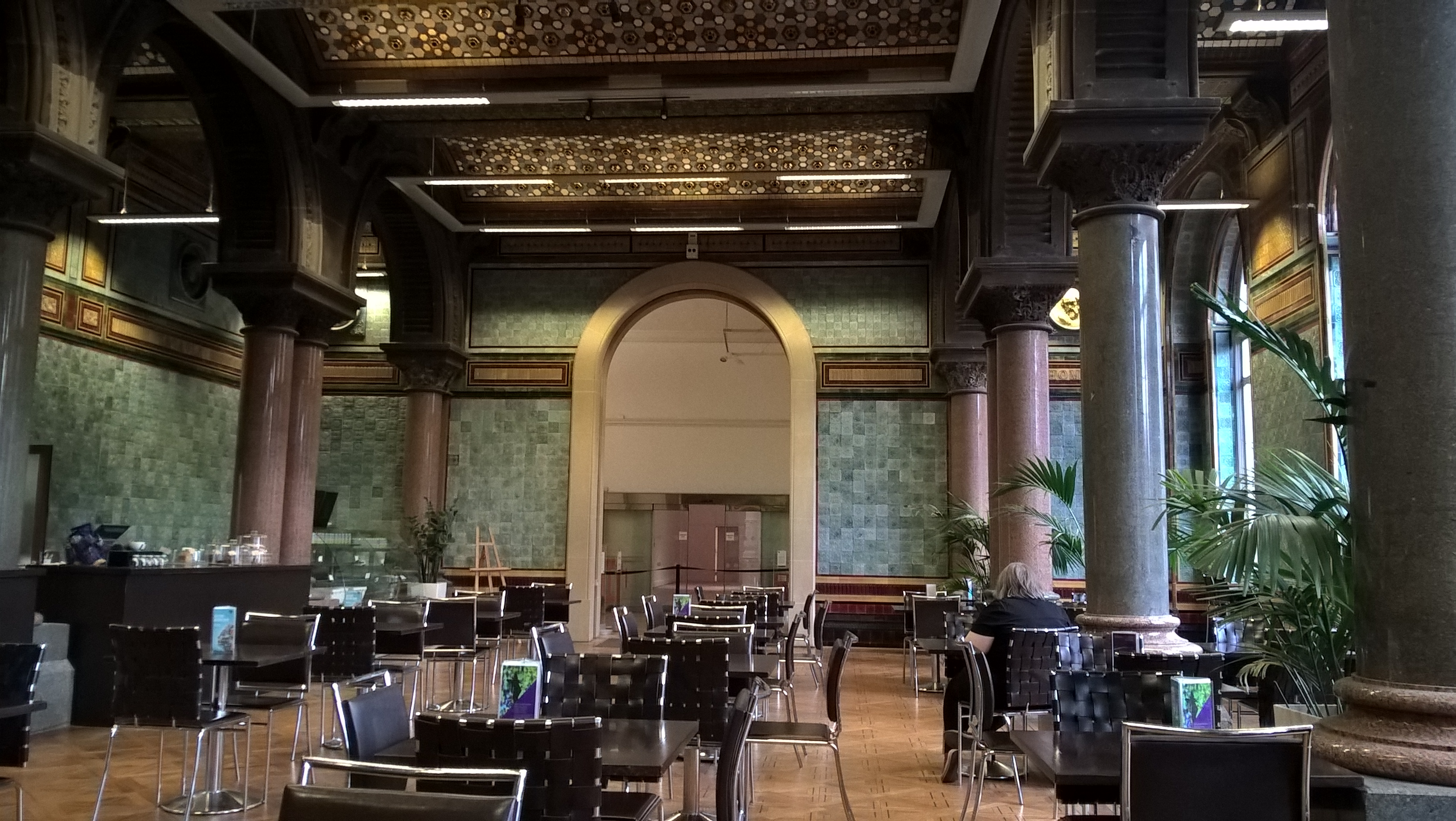
Tiled Hall Café

This room was originally the main library reading room and is 80 ft long by 40 ft wide. The Reading Room was used for the opening ceremony and was described by The Yorkshireman as "a magnificent place. The floor is the finest parquetry in oak, walnut and ebony." The roof was so magnificent it was feared that "people will be continually gazing up at it, instead of quietly reading the magazines and newspapers". A report of the opening noted that "inside the edifice a select company assembled to participate in the opening ceremony. On a slightly raised dais were seated the Mayoress and other ladies of note. Behind... stood a mixed group of politicians, barristers, clergymen, magistrates, merchants and manufacturers. Here and there in various parts of the handsome reading room were well known local dignitaries and would-be dignitaries." The floor is parquet and is made of oak, ebony and walnut. During the recent extensive restoration a gallery and shelving from the 1950s/60s were removed. The original marble pillars were revealed and restored, as well as the tiled walls, with medallion portraits in relief – among them Homer, Shakespeare, Milton, Goethe, Burns, Scott, Horace and Macaulay. The sculptor of the medallions was Benjamin Creswick of London.

The roof is divided into segmental arches, each arch composed of a mosaic in red, buff, grey, blue and green hexagon bricks with golden bosses. There are less of the green ceiling tiles than other colours. It is thought this is because the green tiles were more expensive. The gold ceiling bosses, which are open-ended, were part of the original Victorian ventilation system. Each ventilation pipe is entirely separate from all the others and vents directly to the roof. Originally, the room was lit by 72 incandescent electric lamps. This room is now the home of the Tiled Hall cafe.

=== Staircases ===
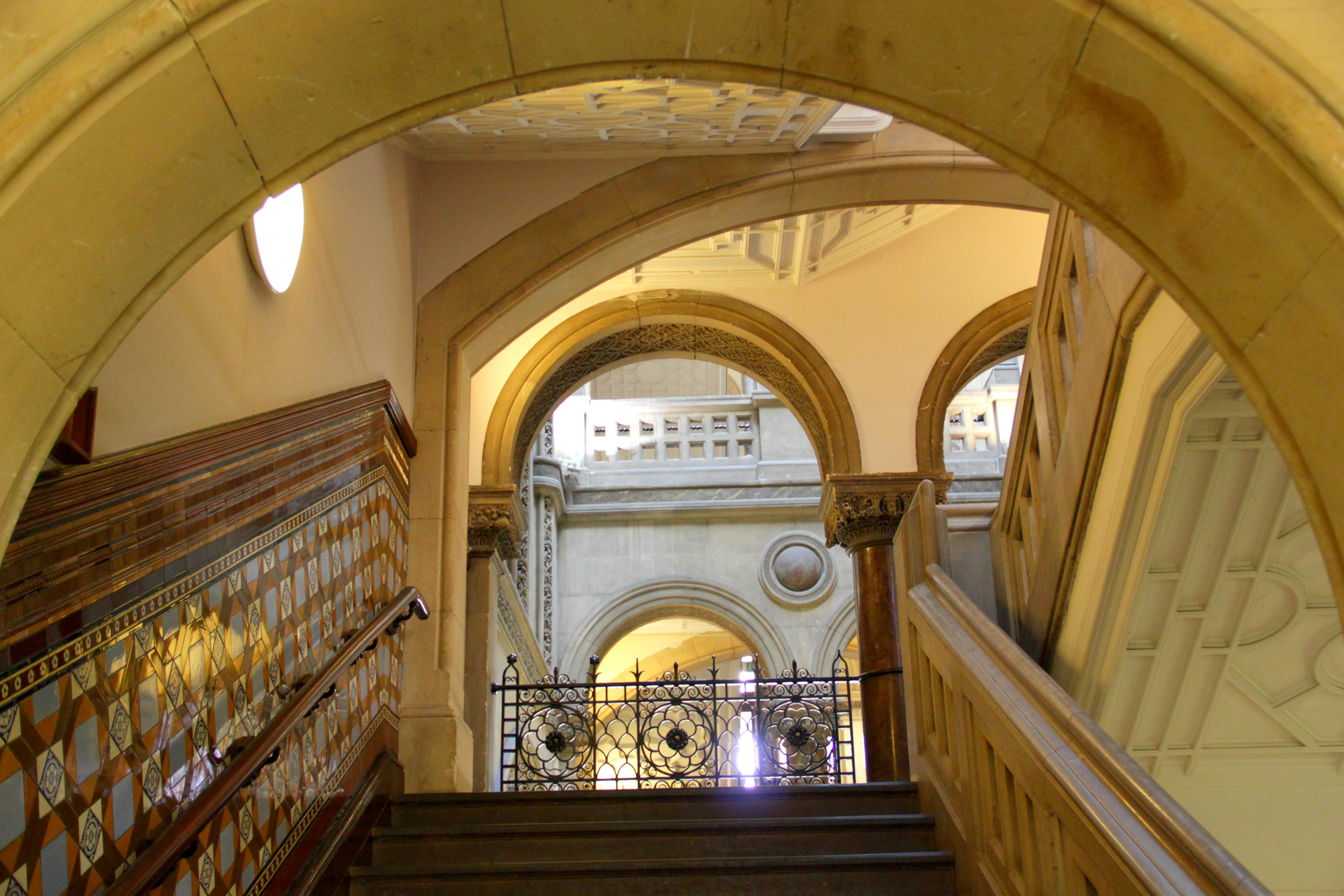
Staircase

The stone staircases have a polished and moulded wide hand rail of marble with stone dogs carved on them at the top and bottom of flights. The steps have iron edges and the floor is mosaic. The pillars on the staircase are made of 380 million-year-old Devonian coral reef and coral fossils can be seen in them. On the second landing, just before the Arts Floor, are Devonian Marble seats. The carved heads of Chaucer, Lamb, Shakespeare and two unnamed individuals can be seen here, on the carved capitals. All general interior carving (except the alabaster arch) is by a team led by John Wormald Appleyard of Leeds.

=== Arts Floor ===
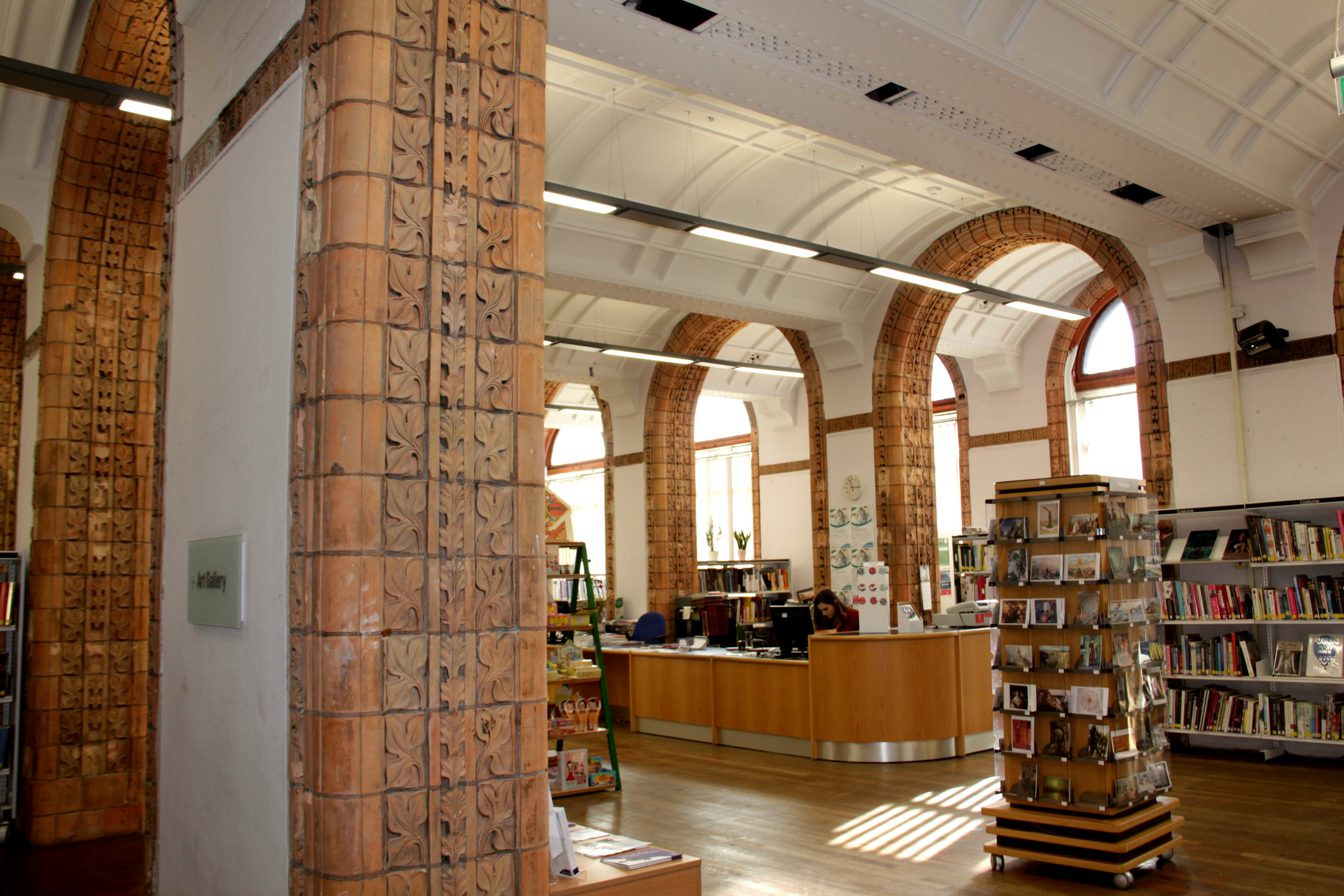
Art Library

The Art Library was originally the lending library which had aisles and a central nave. The library had terracotta columns and arches. The lending library bookcases were made of American walnut. These have subsequently been lost. The side room was originally a small museum, only 22 ft square, and contained, among other exhibits, a stuffed crocodile.

=== Information Floor ===
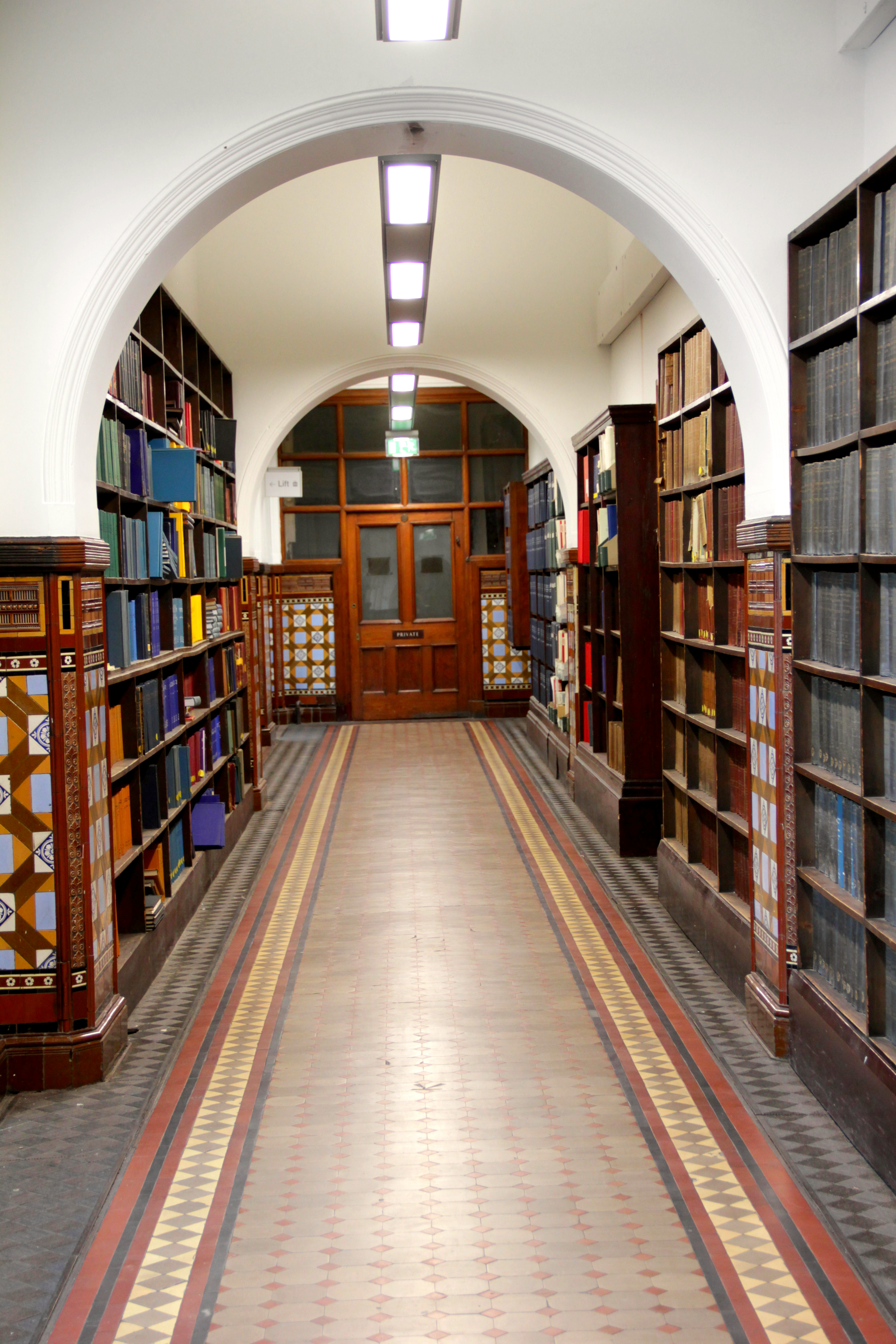
Third floor corridor

The Local & Family History Library was originally a reference library and remains fundamentally unchanged, though with recent redecorations and cleaning to the woodwork. The room is 36 ft high and has terracotta alcoves on both sides. The oak roof is divided by wrought iron principals into panels – and there are mirrored walls at each end of the room at gallery level. The 15 ft long English walnut tables are part of the original furniture.

== Special collections ==
The library is home to several significant collections of antiquarian and special-interest materials:

=== The Gott bequest ===
The Gott bequest is a collection of around 600 early English gardening books and periodicals including works published in the 16th, 17th and 18th centuries. The books in the collection include herbals, books on garden design and many fine examples of hand coloured botanical illustrations. There is also a long run of Curtis's Botanical Magazine dating from 1787. In 1930 Alderman Beryl Gott, of the Leeds textile manufacturing family, bequeathed a gift of money to the Leeds Public Library which was used over a number of years to purchase books on horticulture. On her death in 1941 she also donated a large part of her personal library. An article by Kenneth Lemmon in The Northern Gardener says of the Gott Collection in Leeds City Library, ’I cannot think of another such collection outside the R.H.S. Lindley Library or the British Museum and the older universities.’

=== The Gascoigne collection ===
This collection was donated to the Library in 1968 by Sir Alvary Gascoigne, in memory of his father, Colonel F.R.T. Gascoigne, of Lotherton Hall, Leeds. There are over 3,000 items in the collection of books, pamphlets and periodicals, the majority covering the subjects of military and naval history. The army and navy lists from the early nineteenth century and histories of regiments are a rich source for researchers of 19th-century military history.

== See also ==
- Grade II* listed buildings in Leeds
- List of libraries in Leeds
- Listed buildings in Leeds (City and Hunslet Ward - northern area)
