= Leeds Mechanics' Institute =

Educational institution in Leeds, England

Coordinates: 53°48′06″N 01°32′49″W

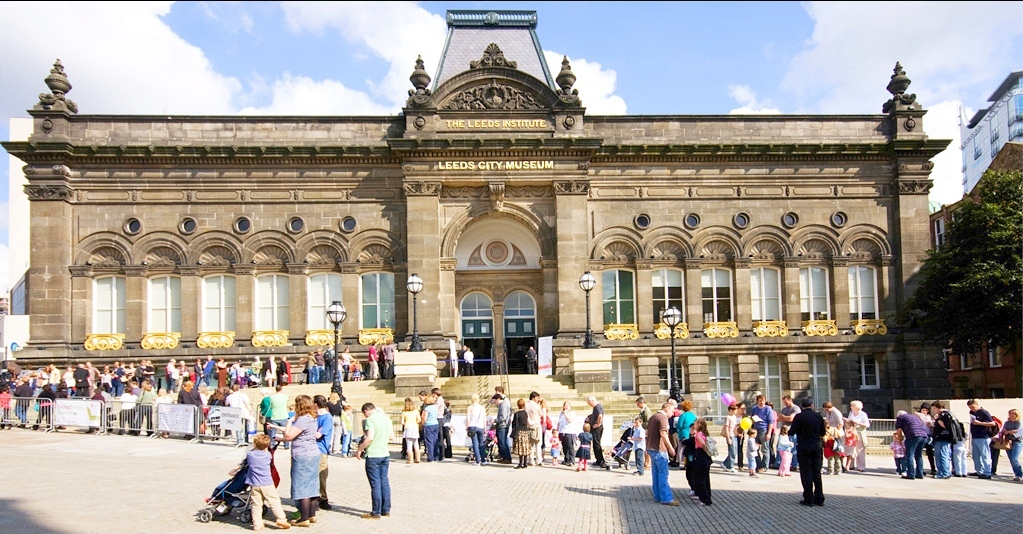
The Mechanics' Institute building on the opening day of the rehoused Leeds City Museum in 2009

Leeds Mechanics' Institute was a mechanics' institute founded in 1824 in Leeds, West Yorkshire, England, and is one of the predecessor institutions of Leeds Beckett University and Leeds Arts University.

== History ==
The institute was founded by members of the Leeds Philosophical and Literary Society who wished to offer educational opportunities to the working class. Initially it occupied two rooms, a library and a lecture room, in a house on Park Row.

In 1824, the Leeds Mechanics' Institute (LMI) remained under the stewardship of its proprietors, prominent figures in Leeds such as Baines, Kitson, and Marshall. While the institute was primarily sustained by annual subscribers, reflecting Victorian class distinctions, its membership fees varied based on individuals' financial capabilities. Affluent members paid 15 shillings per year, payable in installments, while the Mechanics Class, with its more modest means, paid either 12 shillings or 8 shillings annually. Subscribers enjoyed access to a well-stocked library and a reading room. The core curriculum consisted of Writing and Grammar, French, Geography, Chemistry and Mathematics. Over time more classes were added. Additionally, the institute hosted a diverse array of lectures as part of its Autumn and Winter annual program, delivered by both LMI members and visiting speakers. Annual social events like mid-Winter evening soirees and Summer excursions to places like Castle Howard and Wentworth Castle were also a part of the institute's offerings. By 1860s some employers offered their workers classes at a reduced rate. One organization had around 100 employees enrolled.

The architect Cuthbert Brodrick, known for his design of the neighboring Town Hall, was tasked with creating a new edifice on Cookridge Street, now known as Millennium Square. The construction of this building spanned five years and incurred a cost of £20,000. At the heart of this structure, crafted in the French Second Empire style, stood a lecture hall capable of seating 1,500 individuals, its balcony supported by cast iron columns. Surrounding this focal point, on two levels, were facilities including a library, reading room, classrooms, laboratory, art studio, and a dining area. Over time, the Institute evolved into Leeds College of Art in 1903, with subsequent modifications to its interior throughout the 20th century, notably converting the lecture hall into a theatre. Recognized with a Grade II* listing, the building presently serves as the city's museum, with the central circular lecture theatre repurposed into exhibition space.

By 1907 most further education in Leeds was in the hands of the council, with the establishment of the Leeds College of Art, Leeds College of Technology (later Kitson College) and Leeds College of Commerce (later Park Lane College). The main activities of the Leeds Institute, as it was now named, after 1907 included a lecture series, a library for its subscribers, and a cafe. The Leeds Institute struggled financially and in 1912 obtained the permission of the Charity Commission to sell its building and land to Leeds Corporation, for a sum ("not less than £39,000") large enough to clear its debts. It arranged to rent the building from the corporation. In 1940, the Leeds Institute had a dwindling membership and was unable, due to war-time restrictions, to hold its usual evening lectures. It went into voluntary liquidation and ceased to exist, with the lease on the building being surrendered to the landlord, Leeds Education Committee, for £2,310 9s 6d on 21 May 1940.

A 2019 thesis from the University of Huddersfield includes a "genealogy" diagram showing the intermediate stages by which the Mechanics' Institution (its initial name) led to the formation of Leeds Beckett University and Leeds Arts University, while its premises now house Leeds City Museum.

== Building ==
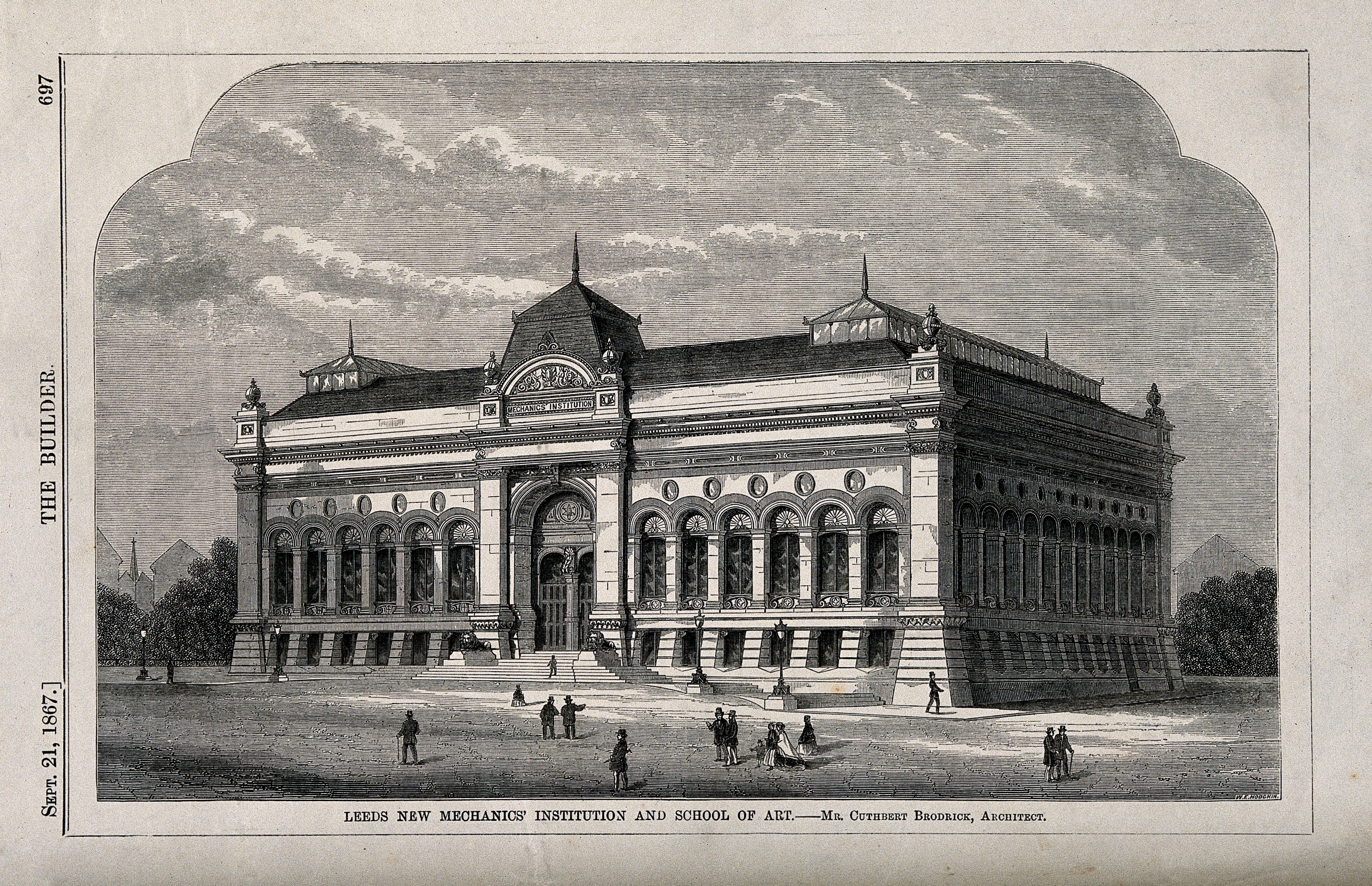
"Leeds New Mechanics' Institution and School of Art", engraving in The Builder, 1867

The Leeds Mechanics' Institute building, designed by Cuthbert Brodrick, was built in 1865–1868 in Cookridge Street. The building is now grade II* listed, and since 2008 has been the home of Leeds City Museum. Before housing the museum, the building had several educational and cultural uses, including housing Leeds Civic Theatre and some departments of what was then the Leeds College of Music.

== See also ==
- List of libraries in Leeds
