= Leeds Library =

Oldest surviving UK subscription library

Coordinates: 53.7975°N 1.5444°W

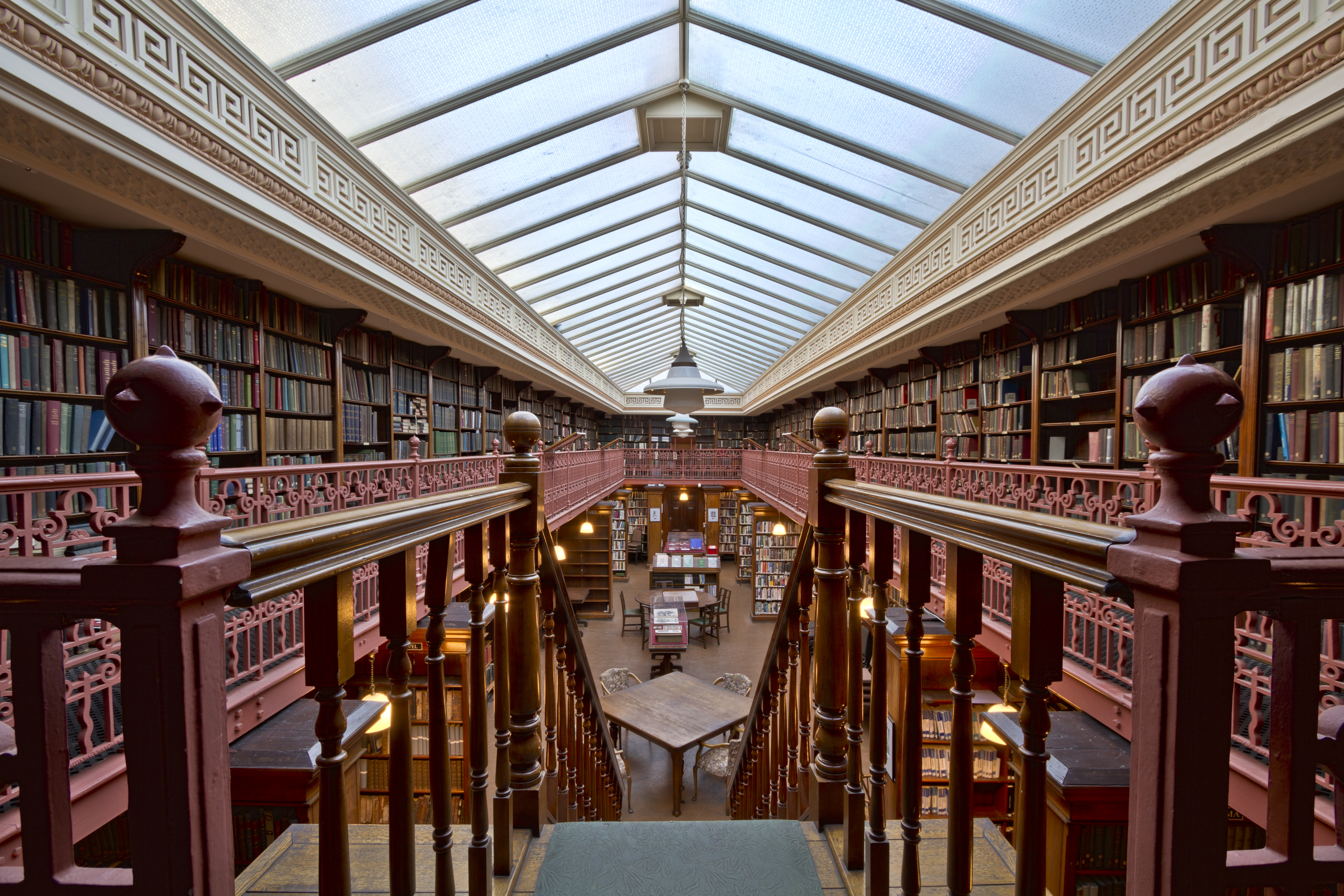
The Leeds Library interior

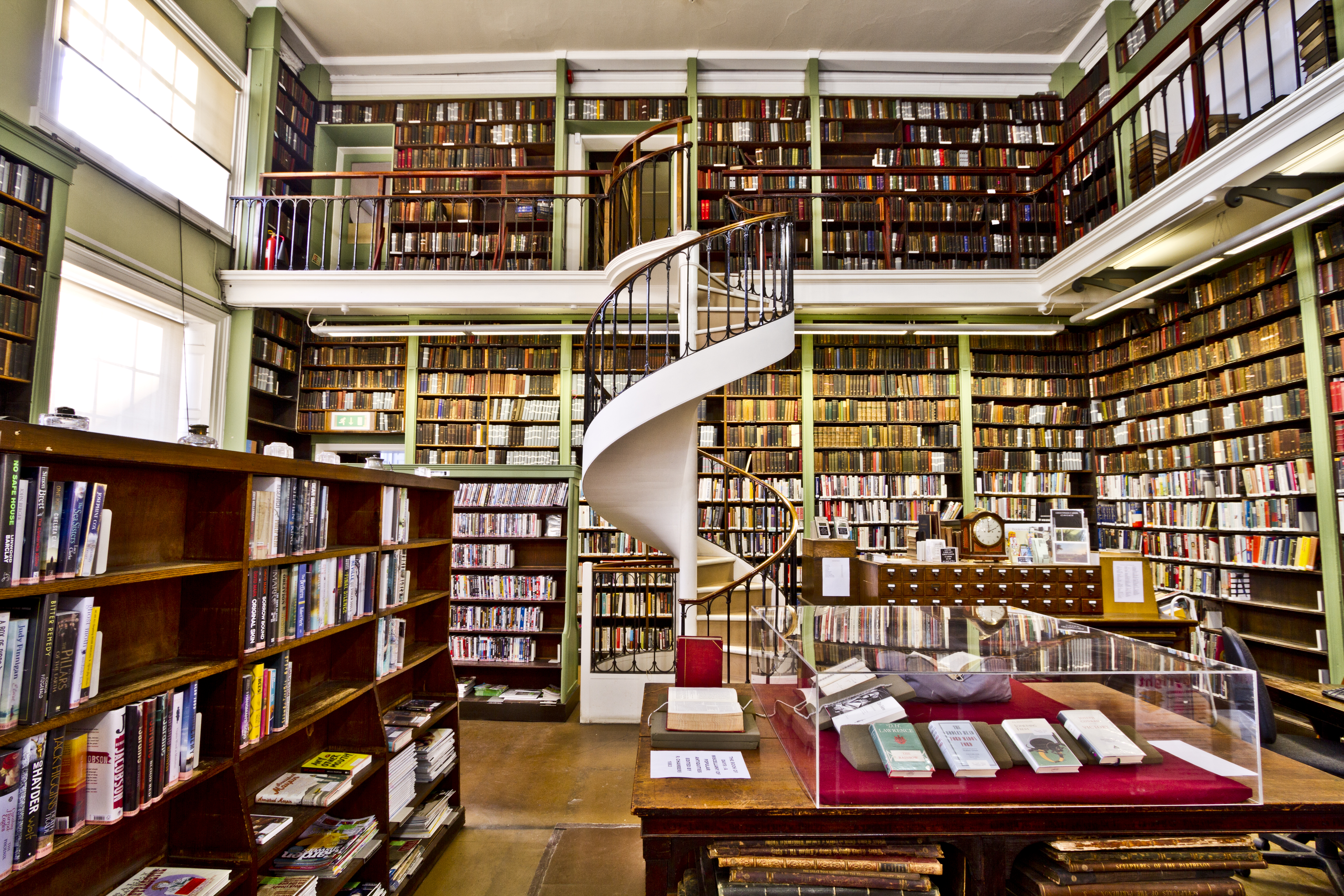
The main room

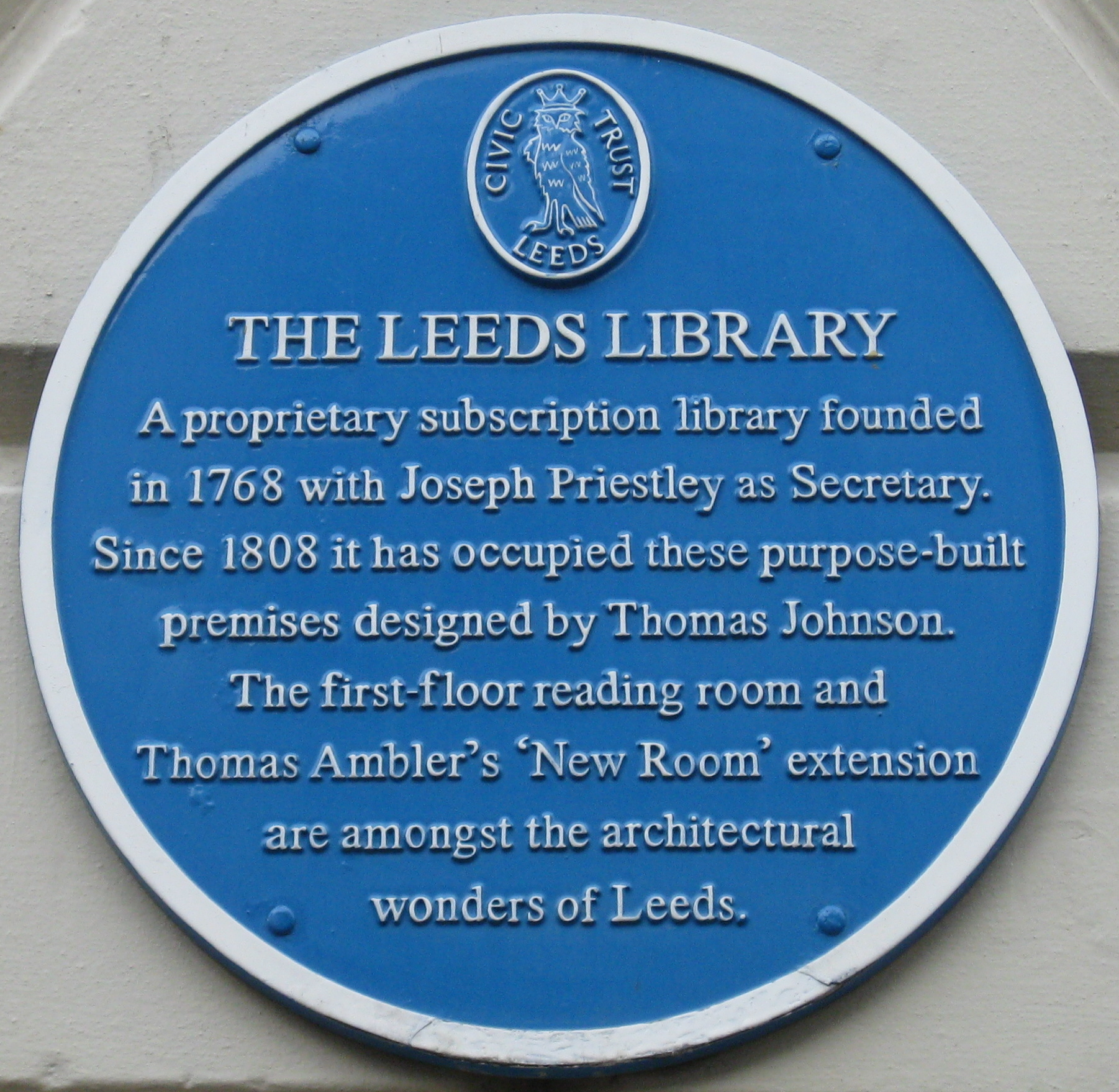
Blue plaque on the exterior

The Leeds Library is the oldest surviving subscription library of its type in the UK. It was founded in 1768, following an advertisement placed in the Leeds Intelligencer earlier that year. The first secretary was Joseph Priestley. In 1779, James Boswell wrote, "In Leeds, where one would not expect it, there is a very good public library, where strangers are treated with great civility." Notable members include the abolitionist Wilson Armistead.

The library moved twice before settling in the purpose built premises on Commercial Street, Leeds on 4 July 1808. This building is a grade II* listed Greek Revival building by Thomas Johnson with major 1880–81 extension to the rear by Thomas Ambler.

As of June 2020 the library has over 1,000 members who pay an annual subscription. The library is estimated to have a stock of over 140,000 titles with 1,500 new books being added annually. It also contains more modern items such as audiobooks and DVDs. The library is a registered charity and its extensive collection is frequently used by researchers who are not members.

The library holdings also incorporate the stock of the short lived Leeds Foreign Library. The Foreign Library was founded in 1778 and incorporated into the Leeds Library in 1814.

The library is the setting for much of Frances Brody's 2014 novel Death of an Avid Reader.

== See also ==
- Grade II* listed buildings in Leeds
- List of libraries in Leeds
- Listed buildings in Leeds (City and Hunslet Ward - northern area)
