= Montreal Children's Library =

Public library and nonprofit organization in Montreal, Quebec

Coordinates: 45°29′19.17″N 73°35′3.41″W

Montreal Children's Library Bibliothèque des jeunes de Montréal
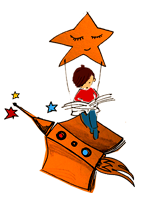
- Type: Public Library in Montreal, Quebec
- Established: 1929

Collection
- Items collected: books, music, cds, periodicals, maps

Other information
- Website: www.mcl-bjm.ca

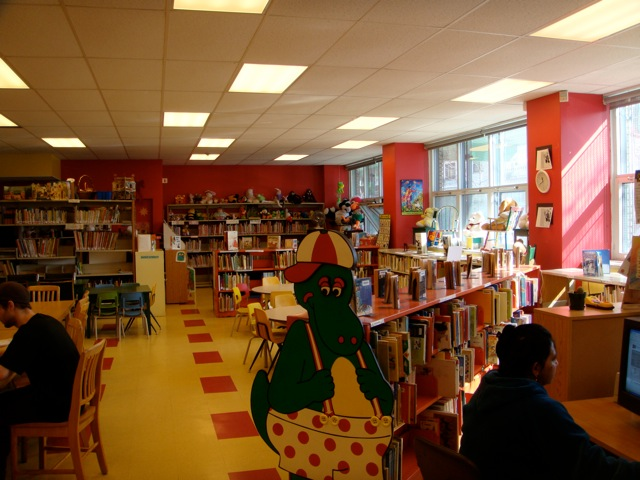
Inside the Polaris Branch

The Montreal Children's Library (French: Bibliothèque des jeunes de Montréal) is a public library and nonprofit organization in Montreal, Quebec.

== History ==
Montreal Children's Library was founded in 1929. It was the first free children's library for both English and French-speaking children in Montreal. The initiator of the Montreal movement for a children’s library was Elizabeth Murray, who came from a family with a long tradition of public service and the belief that every child should have the same opportunity to grow up with books that she herself had enjoyed. When she discovered that the librarian of the Fraser Institute, M. de Crèvecoeur, had set apart a section for children’s reading but lacked the funds to purchase books for it, Miss Murray got in contact with the Local Council (later the Montreal Council of Women), which had formed a committee to inquire into the possibility of establishing a children’s library, under the chairmanship of Maysie McSporran. The committee obtained $3000 in a fund raising campaign, and in October 1929 the room in the Fraser Institute was opened for all girls and boys between the ages of three and sixteen. During its first month of operation, under librarian Violet McEwen, membership grew to 208 children.

== Activities ==
The Montreal Children's Library offers a variety of activities, including parent-child story time, craft-making, reading circles and group activities such as a chess club.

The library's programs and activities are all free and are targeted at children ranging from 0–17 years of age.

In addition to its various in-house activities, the Montreal Children's Library engages in a wide range of outreach projects.

== Location ==
The Montreal Children's Library is located at 4121 42nd Rue in St. Michel. The head librarian is Laurence Savage-Duguay.
