= List of secondary schools in the Toronto District School Board =

Toronto District School Board formerly known as the Metropolitan Toronto School Board

Location
- 5050 Yonge Street; North York, Toronto, Ontario, M2N 5N8 Canada

District information
- Established: January 20, 1953 (MTSB) January 1, 1998 (current form)
- Superintendents: 22 + 4 associate directors
- Schools: 473 elementary schools 110 secondary schools 5 adult education schools
- Budget: ~CA$3.4 billion (2019–2020)
- District ID: B66052

Other information
- Chair of the Board: Alexander Brown
- Director of Education: Interim Director - Karen Flaconer
- Elected trustees: 22
- Student trustees: Jeffrey Osaro, Naomi Musa
- Website: tdsb.on.ca

This is a list of secondary schools in the Toronto District School Board. The board is Canada's largest school board and governs 110 secondary schools, as well as five adult education schools. The TDSB was founded in 1954 as the Metropolitan Toronto School Board which would later merge with six anglophone boards: the Board of Education for the City of York, the East York Board of Education, the North York Board of Education, the Scarborough Board of Education, the Etobicoke Board of Education and the Toronto Board of Education to form the Toronto District School Board while the former francophone board of the MTSB merged with other boards in the same region to form Conseil scolaire Viamonde.

In secondary school, students may enter three general streams based on their goals upon graduation: academic for students planning on attending university, applied for students planning on attending college, and locally developed for students with special needs who are planning on entering the workforce.

== Types of schools ==
Most TDSB secondary institutions operate as a collegiate institute, and provide secondary education in all types of subjects available (Arts, Tech, French, etc.) from grades 9–12 levels. University, college, and open streams are available at these institutions. In addition to Collegiate Institute, secondary institutions of this nature may also go by the name Academy, Collegiate and Technical Institute, Secondary School, or Technical School. Some schools in the legacy boards used Vocational School for slow learners and technical focused schools while the Scarborough Board of Education employed the name Business and Technical Institute from 1987 to 2019.

Several secondary institutions may have a stronger academic focus on a subject then most other schools as a specialized component. The school board operates several art-specialized secondary schools, typically called School of the Arts or School for the Arts. Some schools in the TDSB offer specialized programs to provide particular opportunities and to provide a focus on a variety of interests. Each specialized program has specific requirements as well as unique admission criteria. These include:

- Africentric Secondary Program: Students are given an alternative way of learning in some of their courses through an Africentric lens.
- Arts Focused Schools/Arts Program: Special programs offer a focus on the arts.
- Entrepreneurship: A special program that develops the innovation, flexibility and self-reliance required to be successful in a business-driven environment.
- Centre of Innovation for Skills and Technologies (CIST): Customized learning hubs focusing on science, technology, engineering and mathematics (STEM). Students focus on engineering design process through real-world applications with the goal of preparation for university level studies.

Alternative school are also operated by the school board for students who are at risk or failing, or may refer to schools that focus on independent study and are structured like a university. In some cases, the EdVance or diploma program is served to 18- to 20-year-olds who are out of or returning to school similar to a collegiate level. TDSB also operates A Safe and Caring School, is a special program for suspended or expelled students who are out of school or at-risk for improper behavioural issues at their home school.

The school board also operates several adult learning centres for adults over the age of 21 who are opting to return to secondary studies, or who are seeking to improve their skills.

== List of secondary schools ==
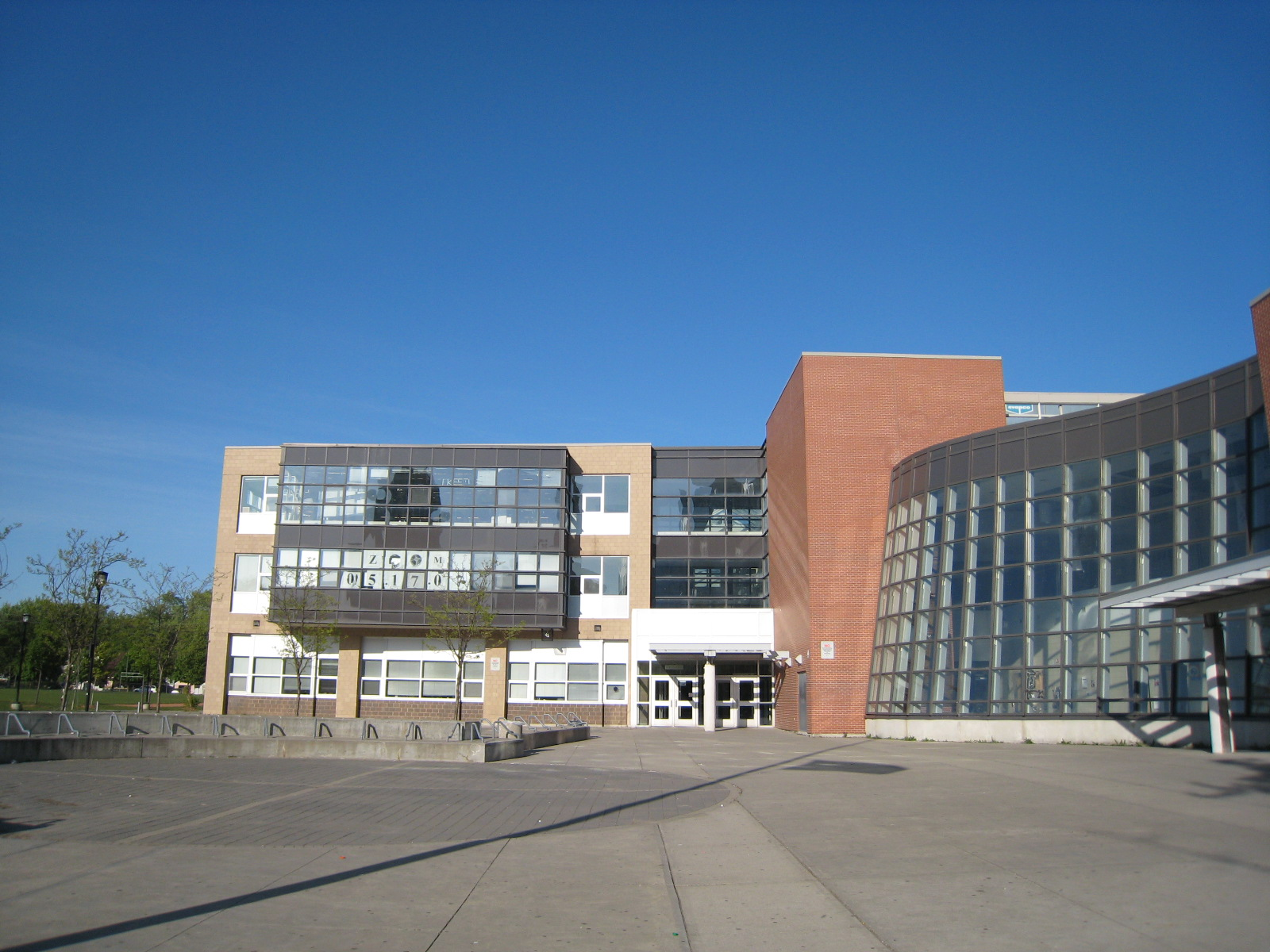
Earl Haig Secondary School is the largest secondary school with over 2,000 students, and one of the highest performing schools in Toronto.

Marc Garneau Collegiate Institute is the second largest secondary school in Toronto.

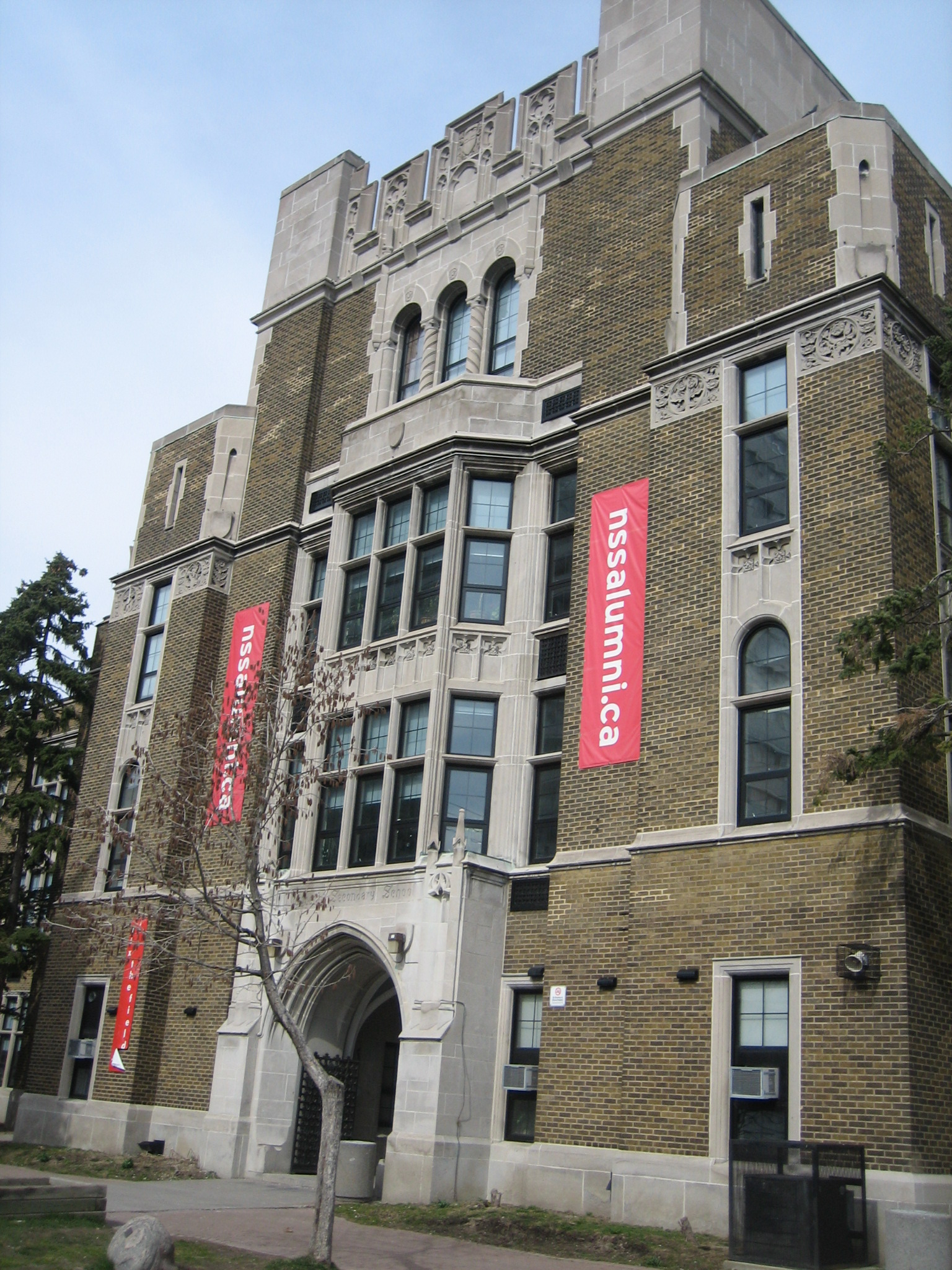
Northern Secondary School is the third largest secondary school in Toronto.

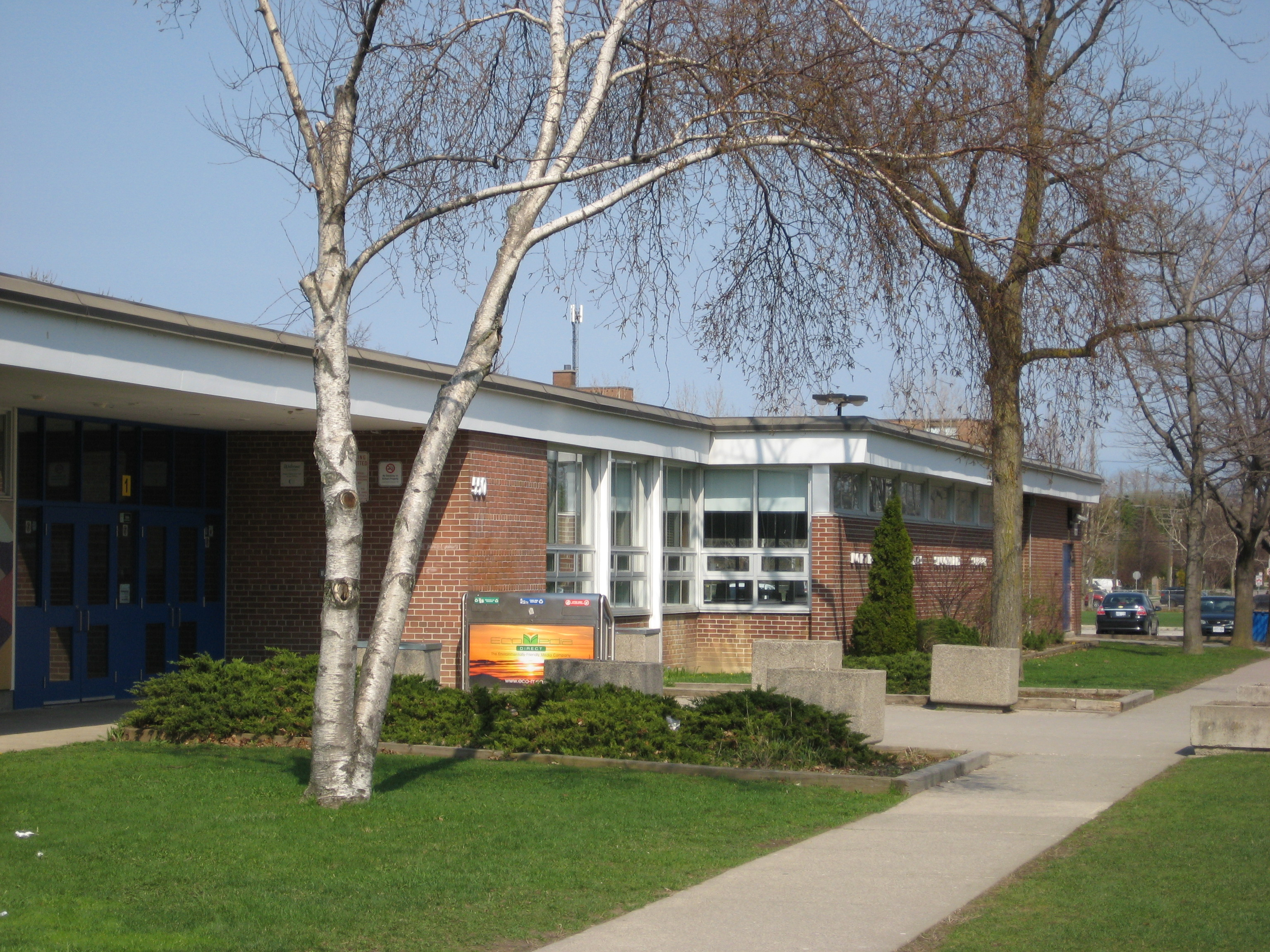
Northview Heights Secondary School is the fourth largest secondary school in Toronto.

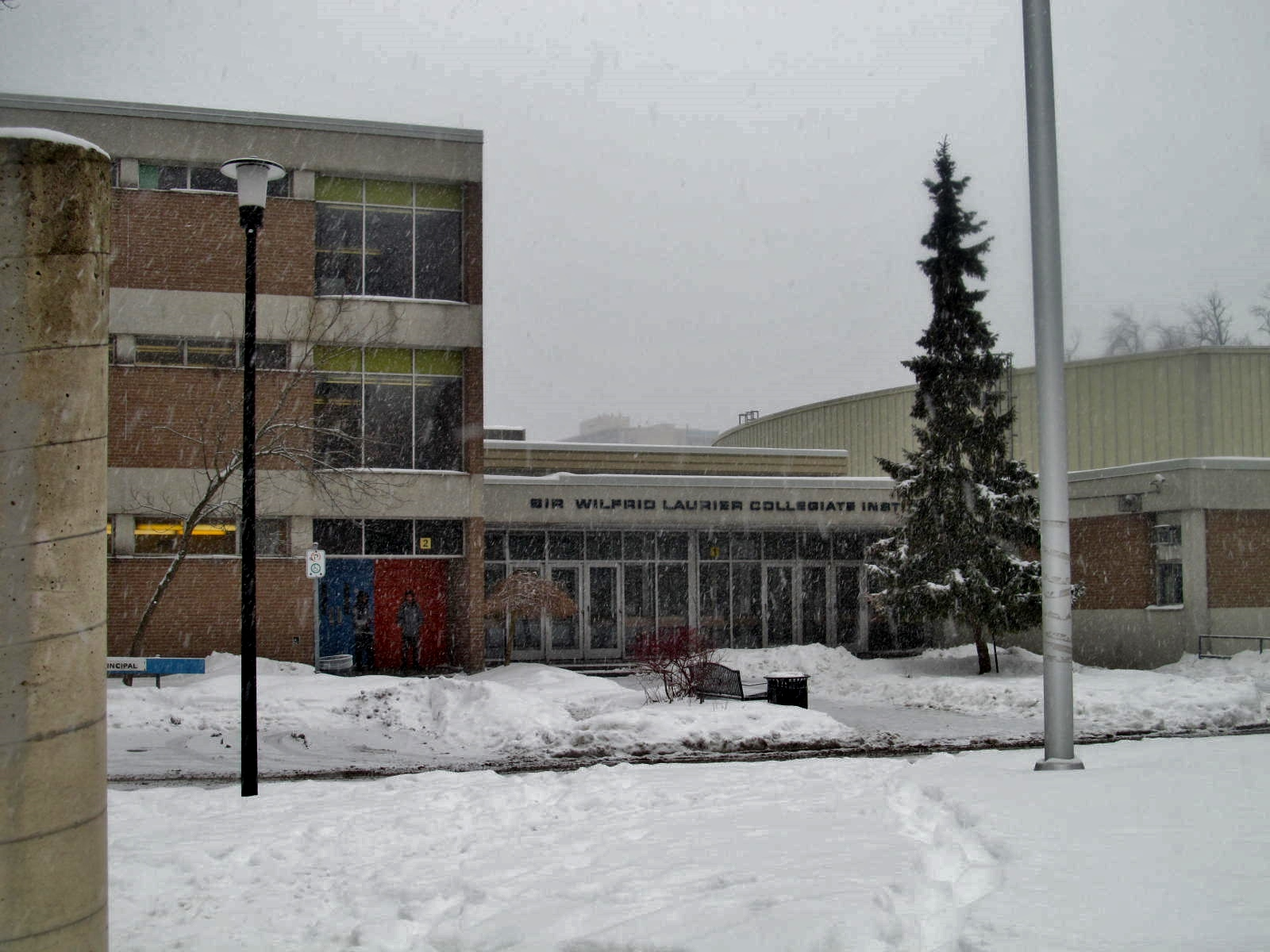
Sir Wilfrid Laurier Collegiate Institute is Toronto's fifth largest public secondary school.

Name	Location	Year founded	Population (Dec. 2017)	ESL population	EQAO Academic Math score (2016–2018)	OSSLT pass (2016–2018)	Special programs	Picture
A. Y. Jackson Secondary School	North York	1970	1,055	84%	93% ▲	90% ▼		
Agincourt Collegiate Institute	Scarborough	1915	1,236	79%	90% ▼	92% ▲	French Immersion, Extended French	
Albert Campbell Collegiate Institute	Scarborough	1976	1,219	86%	84% ▼	80% ▼		
Birchmount Park Collegiate Institute	Scarborough	1964	849	43%	67% ▲	70%	Elite Athletes/Arts	
Bloor Collegiate Institute	Toronto	1925	777	65%	91% ▼	91% ▼	Math, Science & Technology Advanced Placement	
C. W. Jefferys Collegiate Institute	North York	1965	731	61%	74% ▼	66% ▼	Arts Programs, Math, Science & Technology	
Cedarbrae Collegiate Institute	Scarborough	1961	1,146	58%	49% ▲	68%	French Immersion, Extended French, Media Arts	
Central Technical School	Toronto	1915	1,129	48%	41% ▼	53% ▲	Arts Programs	
Central Toronto Academy	Toronto	1911	537	59%	60% ▲	68% ▲	Advanced Placement	
Danforth Collegiate and Technical Institute	Toronto	1923	917	43%	84% ▲	72% ▲	Math, Science & Technology	
David and Mary Thomson Collegiate Institute	Scarborough	1959	987	68%	59% ▼	66% ▼	Advanced Placement	
Don Mills Collegiate Institute	North York	1959	1,055	67%	87%	87% ▲	Cyber Arts	
Downsview Secondary School	North York	1955	588	48%	60% ▲	44% ▼	Africentric Secondary Program, Arts Programs	
Dr Norman Bethune Collegiate Institute	Scarborough	1979	1,076	91%	92% ▼	87%		
Earl Haig Secondary School	North York	1929	1,993	75%	93% ▼	92% ▼	Arts Focused Schools	
East York Collegiate Institute	East York	1927	972	55%	72% ▲	70% ▲	French Immersion	
Emery Collegiate Institute	North York	1961	617	57%	35% ▲	61% ▼	Cyber Studies	
Etobicoke Collegiate Institute	Etobicoke	1928	1,027	45%	94%	84% ▼		
Etobicoke School of the Arts	Toronto	1981	921	20%	90% ▼	97%	Arts Focused Schools	
Forest Hill Collegiate Institute	Toronto	1948	979	53%	92%	89% ▼		
George Harvey Collegiate Institute	York	1952	533	63%	42% ▼	71% ▼	Cyber Studies	
George S. Henry Academy	North York	1965	401	70%	69%	68% ▼		
Georges Vanier Secondary School	North York	1966	814	83%	76% ▲	69%	Arts Programs, Math, Science & Technology	
Harbord Collegiate Institute	Toronto	1892	1,051	44%	77% ▼	89% ▼	French Immersion, Extended French	
Humberside Collegiate Institute	Toronto	1892	1,181	29%	88% ▼	94%	French Immersion, Extended French	
Jarvis Collegiate Institute	Toronto	1807	684	78%	56% ▼	76%	Advanced Placement	
John Polanyi Collegiate Institute	North York	1968	896	62%	57% ▼	76% ▼	Math, Science & Technology	
Kipling Collegiate Institute	Etobicoke	1960	462	77%	44% ▼	53% ▼	Math, Science & Technology	
L'Amoreaux Collegiate Institute	Scarborough	1973	537	82%	83% ▼	76%	Extended French	
Lakeshore Collegiate Institute	Etobicoke	1983	626	35%	66% ▲	69% ▲	Cyber Arts, Advanced Placement	
Lawrence Park Collegiate Institute	Toronto	1936	1,162	21%	89%	96% ▼	French Immersion, Extended French	
Leaside High School	East York	1945	997	37%	87% ▲	97%	French Immersion, Extended French	
Lester B. Pearson Collegiate Institute	Scarborough	1978	1,383	72%	77% ▼	75%		
Malvern Collegiate Institute	Toronto	1903	1,130	13%	89% ▼	94% ▼	French Immersion, Extended French	
Marc Garneau Collegiate Institute	East York	1973	1,715	94%	87% ▼	80% ▲	Math, Science & Technology	
Martingrove Collegiate Institute	Etobicoke	1966	1,177	58%	83% ▼	85%	Advanced Placement	
Monarch Park Collegiate Institute	Toronto	1964	825	42%	78% ▼	85% ▲	International Baccalaureate	
Newtonbrook Secondary School	North York	1964	893	81%	72% ▼	69% ▼	French Immersion, Extended French	
North Albion Collegiate Institute	Etobicoke	1962	842	69%	76% ▲	74% ▲		
North Toronto Collegiate Institute	Toronto	1910	1,265	37%	91%	98% ▲		
Northern Secondary School	Toronto	1930	1,776	24%	86%	89% ▼		
Northview Heights Secondary School	North York	1957	1,692	79%	91%	84%	Cyber Arts, Elite Athletes/Arts, Math, Science & Technology	
Oakwood Collegiate Institute	Toronto	1908	460	32%	45% ▼	68% ▼	Extended French	
Parkdale Collegiate Institute	Toronto	1888	500	59%	76%	81% ▲	International Baccalaureate	
R. H. King Academy	Scarborough	1922	1,239	62%	89% ▼	88% ▼	Leadership Pathway	
Richview Collegiate Institute	Etobicoke	1958	961	34%	85% ▼	94%	French Immersion, Extended French	
Riverdale Collegiate Institute	Toronto	1907	1,181	44%	89% ▲	85% ▲	Extended French	
Rosedale Heights School of the Arts	Toronto		1,044	17%	79%	95%	Arts Focused Schools	
Runnymede Collegiate Institute	York	1927	613	47%	65% ▲	65% ▼	Math, Science & Technology	
SATEC @ W. A. Porter Collegiate Institute	Scarborough	1958	1,264	77%	90% ▼	87% ▼	Cyber Studies, Math, Science & Technology	
Silverthorn Collegiate Institute	Etobicoke	1964	912	51%	80% ▼	80%	Elite Athletes/Arts	
Sir John A. Macdonald Collegiate Institute	Scarborough	1964	1,104	73%	87%	87%		
Sir Oliver Mowat Collegiate Institute	Scarborough	1970	1,098	30%	75% ▼	83% ▲		
Sir Wilfrid Laurier Collegiate Institute	Scarborough	1965	1,354	56%	79% ▲	73% ▼	International Baccalaureate	
Stephen Leacock Collegiate Institute	Scarborough	1969	639	76%	87% ▼	77% ▲	Media Arts	
Thistletown Collegiate Institute	Etobicoke	1957	485	62%	65% ▼	72% ▲		
Ursula Franklin Academy	Toronto	1995	501	29%	94%	99%	Integrated Technology	
Victoria Park Collegiate Institute	North York	1960	1,289	77%	90% ▼	84% ▼	International Baccalaureate	
West Hill Collegiate Institute	Scarborough	1955	704	43%	55% ▼	72%	Advanced Placement	
West Humber Collegiate Institute	Etobicoke	1966	984	64%	88% ▲	75% ▲	Math, Science & Technology, Advanced Placement	
Western Technical-Commercial School	Toronto	1927	1,106	38%	72% ▼	73% ▲	Cyber Arts	
Weston Collegiate Institute	York	1857	1,043	58%	49%	66% ▼	Africentric Secondary Program, International Baccalaureate, SHSM	
Westview Centennial Secondary School	North York	1967	892	50%	47% ▲	47%		
Wexford Collegiate School for the Arts	Scarborough	1965	1,120	41%	73% ▲	80% ▼	Arts Focused Schools	
William Lyon Mackenzie Collegiate Institute	North York	1960	1,348	67%	92% ▲	93%	Math, Science & Technology	
Winston Churchill Collegiate Institute	Scarborough	1954	633	61%	73% ▼	64%	Africentric Secondary Program, Advanced Placement	
Woburn Collegiate Institute	Scarborough	1963	944	75%	78% ▼	79% ▼		
York Memorial Collegiate Institute	York	1929	871	62%	61% ▼	77% ▼	Advanced Placement	
York Mills Collegiate Institute	North York	1957	984	70%		91%	French Immersion	

== Alternative schools ==
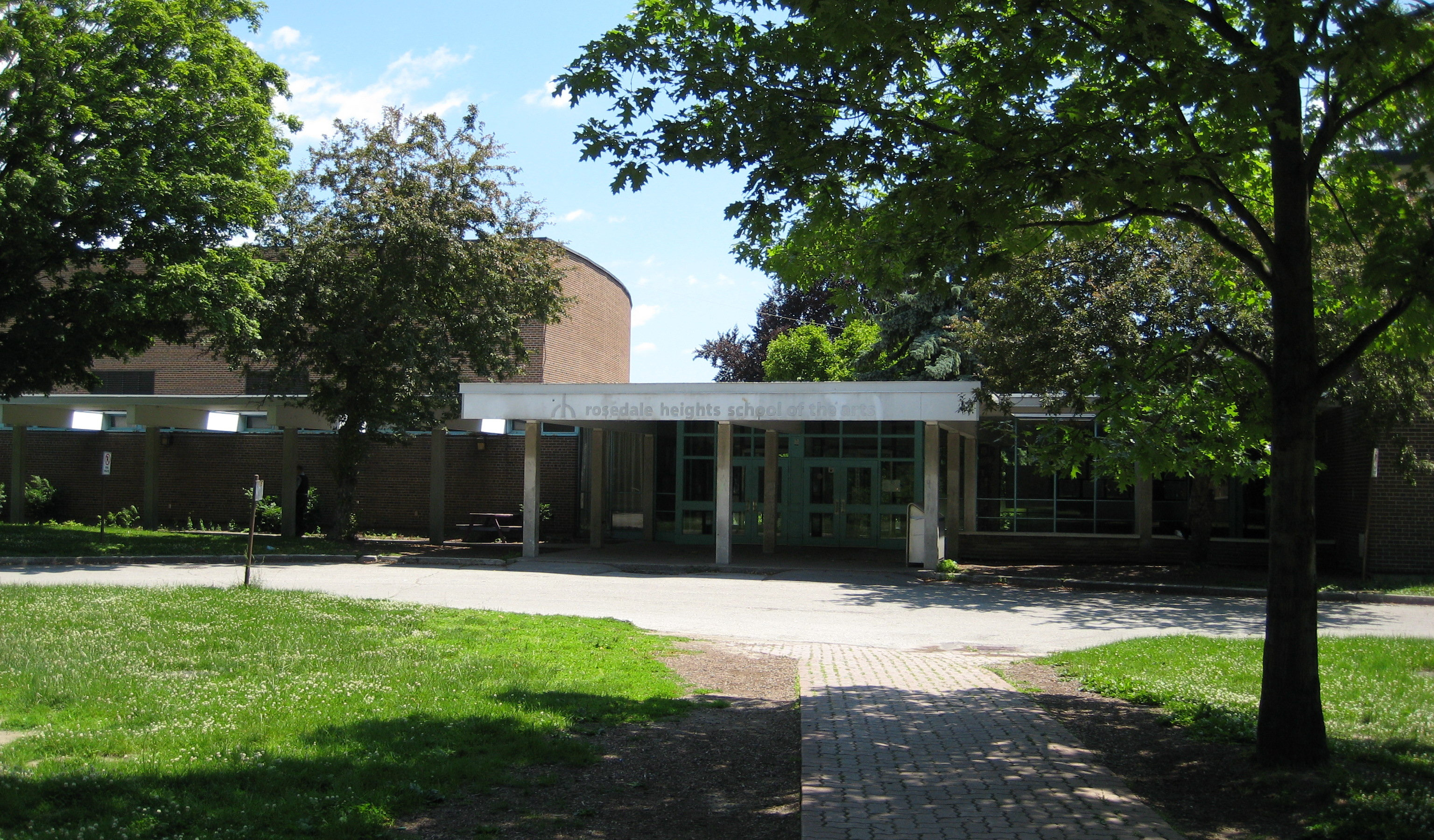
Rosedale school of the arts Located in Downtown Toronto

An alternative school may be for students who are at risk or failing, or may refer to schools that focus on independent study and are structured like university. In some cases, the EdVance or diploma program is served to 18- to 20-year-olds who are out of or returning to school, similar to a collegiate level. For adults over 21 who are returning to school or improving their skills, adult learning centers are offered.

Name	Location	Population (Dec. 31 2017)
Alternative Scarborough Education 1	Scarborough	107
Avondale Elementary & Secondary Alternative	North York	51
Burnhamthorpe Collegiate Institute	Etobicoke	379
CALC Secondary School	Toronto	552
Central Etobicoke High School	Etobicoke	141
City School	Toronto	120
Contact Alternative School	Toronto	183
Delphi Secondary Alternative School	Scarborough	118
Drewry Secondary School	North York	118
East York Alternative Secondary School	East York	121
Eastdale Collegiate Institute	Toronto	119
Emery EdVance Secondary School	North York	143
Etobicoke Year-Round Alternative Centre	Etobicoke	49
Frank Oke Secondary School	York	104
Greenwood Secondary School	Toronto	217
Heydon Park Secondary School	Toronto	161 (Note: Girls only)
Inglenook Community School	Toronto	81 (Note: Grades 11 and 12 only)
Maplewood High School	Scarborough	182
Native Learning Centre	Toronto	38
Native Learning Centre East	Scarborough	15
Oasis Alternative Secondary School	Toronto	109
Parkview Alternative School	Scarborough	84
Scarborough Centre for Alt Studies Adult	Scarborough	
Scarborough Centre for Alternative Studies	Scarborough	
School of Experiential Education	Etobicoke	
School of Life Experience	Toronto	
SEED Alternative School	Toronto	
Sir William Osler High School	Scarborough	233
South East Year Round Alternative Centre	Scarborough	
Subway Academy I	Toronto	120
Subway Academy II	Toronto	
THESTUDENTSCHOOL	Toronto	
West End Alternative School	Toronto	
York Humber High School	York	216
Yorkdale Adult Learning Centre	North York	

== Former schools ==
Name	Location	Year founded	Year closed	Reason for closure	Picture
A.P. Wheler Public School	Scarborough	1901	1968	Road realignment (McCowan Road)	
Alderwood Collegiate Institute	Etobicoke	1955	1983	Low enrolment	
Bendale Business and Technical Institute	Scarborough	1963	2019	Merged with David and Mary Thomson Collegiate Institute	
Bickford Park High School					
Brockton High School	Toronto	1966	1995		
Eastern Commerce Collegiate Institute	Toronto	1925	2015	Low enrolment	
Humbergrove Secondary School	Etobicoke	1966	1988		
Keiller Mackay Collegiate Institute	Etobicoke	1971	1983		
Kingsmill Secondary School	Etobicoke	1963	1988		
Lakeview Secondary School	Toronto	1967	1989		
Midland Avenue Collegiate Institute	Scarborough	1962	2000	Low enrolment	
Nelson A. Boylen Collegiate Institute	North York	1966	2016	Low enrolment	
Scarlett Heights Entrepreneurial Academy	Etobicoke	1963	2018		
Sir Robert L. Borden Business and Technical Institute	Scarborough	1966	2016		
Tabor Park Vocational School	Scarborough	1965	1986		
Vaughan Road Academy	York	1927	2017	Low enrollment	
Vincent Massey Collegiate Institute	Etobicoke	1961	1985		
West Park Secondary School	Toronto	1968	1988		

== See also ==
- List of Toronto District School Board elementary schools
- List of educational institutions in Etobicoke
- List of educational institutions in Scarborough
- List of schools in the Conseil scolaire catholique MonAvenir
- List of schools in the Conseil scolaire Viamonde
- List of schools in the Toronto Catholic District School Board
