= North York Board of Education =

Board of Education for the City of North York District 13

Location
- 5050 Yonge Street; Toronto, Ontario; M2N 5N8 Canada
- Chair of the board: Gerri Gershon
- Director of education: Marguerite Jackson
- District ID: NYBE
- Elected trustees: 14

The North York Board of Education (NYBE, commonly known as School District 13), officially the Board of Education for the City of North York is the former public school board for the former city of North York in Toronto, Ontario, Canada.

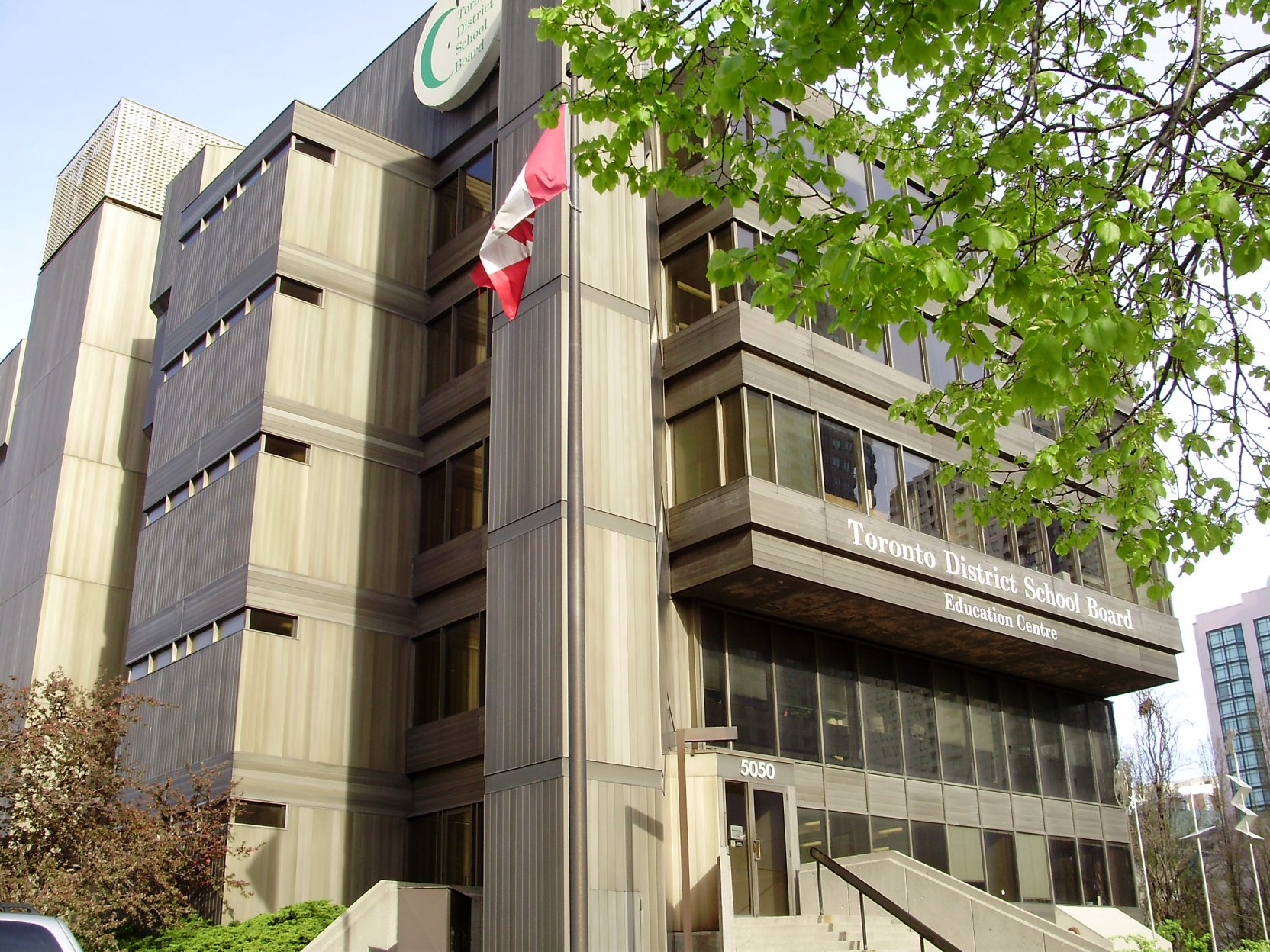
The TDSB Education Centre, located at 5050 Yonge Street, is the headquarters of the Toronto District School Board; it formerly housed NYBE offices

In 1998, the provincial Government of Ontario passed legislation which amalgamated North York into the City of Toronto. As part of the amalgamation process, the NYBE ceased to exist. Today, administration of schools in North York is handled by the Toronto District School Board. The NYBE building was located at 5050 Yonge Street, in the same complex as Mel Lastman Square, the former North York City Hall. This building now houses the Toronto District School Board offices.

== Schools ==
North York operated various elementary, junior high, and secondary schools along with its alternative programs. Active schools are now operated by TDSB , but all existing properties unless disposed are owned by Toronto Lands Corporation.

=== Elementary schools ===
Name	Address	Opened	Notes	Image
Africentric Alternative School	1430 Sheppard Avenue West; North York, ON, M3M 2W9	1958; 2009	Housed in the Sheppard Avenue Public School (1958-2008) building. Post-amalgamation school c 2009; Alternative school.	
Amesbury Middle School	201 Gracefield Avenue; North York, ON, M6L 1L7	1959	Formerly Queensborough Junior High School	
Ancaster Public School	44 Ancaster Road; North York, ON, M3K 1S6	1957		
Don Mills Junior High School	3100 Don Mills Road; North York, ON, M2J 3C3	1971	Don Mills Middle School from 1986	
Burnett Public School	21 Eddiefield Avenue; North York, ON, M2N 3M5	1955	Used as St. Edward Catholic School from 1985 to 2014.; Occupied by The Prestige School in April 2014.	
Calico Public School	35 Calico Drive; North York, ON, M3L 1V5	1959	Formerly attached by St. Blaise Catholic School (1976-1994)	
C.B. Parsons Junior High School	2999 Dufferin Street; North York, ON, M6B 3T4	1945	Used by Seneca College 1980s-1990s; Occupied by the Fieldstone Day School.	
Cummer Public School	500 Cummer Avenue; North York, ON, M2M 2G5	1952	Used by Lester B. Pearson ES from 1987 to 2003.; Operated the Cummer LINC program.; Sold to the Toronto Catholic District School Board in 2012 for reconstruction of St. Joseph's Morrow Park High School.; Demolished in 2014.	
Fairmeadow Public School	17 Fairmeadow Avenue, North York, Ontario	1951	Closed 1981 and students likely absorbed by Owen Public School to the south.; later used by Seneca College as Fairmeadow Campus 1981-1991; now as Fairmeadow Centre by TDSB as administrative site; owned by Toronto Lands Corporation	
Greenland Public School	15 Greenland Road; North York, ON, M3C 1N1	1956		
Hollywood Public School	360 Hollywood Avenue; North York, ON, M2N3L4	1950		
Lillian Public School	1059 Lillian Street; North York, ON, M2M 3G1	1949	Section of school used for juvenile delinquent classes; Section of school used as School of Experiential Education	
McNicoll Public School	155 McNicoll Avenue; North York, ON, M2H 2C1	1966	Closed in 2000; Section of school used as School of Experiential Education	
Melody Road Public School	24 Strathburn Boulevard; North York, ON, M9M 2K3	1951	Closed in 1986; Served as the South Campus for St. Basil-the-Great College School from 1987 to 1999.; Leased to the Taric Islamic School until 2006.; Portion sold to the TCDSB in 2009.	
Owen Public School	111 Owen Boulevard	1993	rebuilt and relocated from corner of Owen and Seneca Street; original site was opened around 1956 and now used for sports field and portables; likely took on students from Fairmeadow PS when it closed in 1981.	
Pleasant View Junior High School	175 Brian Drive; North York, ON, M2J 3Y8	1971		
Sheppard Public School	1430 Sheppard Avenue West; North York, ON, M3M 2W9	1958		
Woodbine Junior High School	2900 Don Mills Road; North York, ON, M2J 3B6	1966		
Yvonne Public School	36 Yvonne Avenue; North York, ON, M3L 1C9	1957	Sold to the TCDSB.; Demolished 2015; Site now occupied by St. Andre Catholic School	
Zion Heights Junior High School	5900 Leslie Street; North York, ON, M2H1J9	1967		

=== Secondary schools ===
- Avondale Alternative Secondary School
- A. Y. Jackson Secondary School
- Bathurst Heights Secondary School
- Nelson A. Boylen Collegiate Institute
- Downsview Secondary School
- Drewry Secondary School
- Emery Collegiate Institute
- Sir Sandford Fleming Academy
- Earl Haig Secondary School
- George S. Henry Academy
- C. W. Jefferys Collegiate Institute
- William Lyon Mackenzie Collegiate Institute
- Don Mills Collegiate Institute
- Newtonbrook Secondary School
- Northview Heights Secondary School
- Victoria Park Collegiate Institute
- Westview Centennial Secondary School
- York Mills Collegiate Institute
- Yorkdale Secondary School

=== French-language schools ===
Previously the district operated two French-language schools in addition to English-language schools. As of May 1980 the district operated two of the seven public French-language schools in Metropolitan Toronto, with the other five being operated by the Metropolitan Separate School Board (now the Toronto Catholic District School Board). The North York school board required that a potential student must know French before being admitted to a French-speaking school. The Conseil des écoles françaises de la communauté urbaine de Toronto (CEFCUT) assumed control of French-language education in the Toronto area on 1 December 1988.

In 1977 the school board voted to build a school out of surplus portable buildings on the site of the Ecole Etienne Brule, spending $120,000 to construct the school. The residents in the area where it was being constructed were against the proposal because 172 children from the area were bussed 2.4 kilometres (1.5 mi) away to another school, and the new school in their community would not serve them. At nighttime, when workers tried to move the portables onto the site, some residents tried to obstruct their efforts.
