= Highcastle (disambiguation) =

Highcastle may refer to:

- Highcastle: A Remembrance, a 1966 coming-of-age autobiographical novel by Stanisław Lem
- Lord Augustus Highcastle, the protagonist of Augustus Does His Bit, a 1916 comic play by George Bernard Shaw
- Highcastle, a fictional frontier fort town in novel A Darkness at Sethanon by Raymond E. Feist and in the video game Betrayal at Krondor based on it
- Highcastle Public School, an elementary school in the Toronto District School Board, Canada
