= Toronto eSchool =

Coordinates: 43.76751°N 79.29866°W

- 445 Apple Creek Blvd, Unit 217. Markham ON L3R 9X7 Canada

Information
- Type: Ontario Secondary School - OSSD Online
- Established: 2013
- Principal: Daniel Bowyer
- Staff: Rebecca Wang (Guidance)
- Grades: 9 to 12
- Enrollment: 18,800 (as of 2024)
- Website: ossd.torontoeschool.com

Toronto eSchool is an online high school and tutoring centre located in Toronto, Ontario, Canada. Toronto eSchool is inspected and approved by the Ontario Ministry of Education (BSID # 886520) to grant Ontario high school credits and the Ontario Secondary School Diploma (OSSD) itself since 2013. The tutoring centre offers both traditional tutoring and Maximize Your Success programs offered via seminars/webinars, workshops, academic programs, and test preparation classes.

== Academic model for online high school ==
Toronto eSchool uses an asynchronous model, which means students can enroll and begin courses any time during the school year and work at their own pace in completing the courses. Students are given 12 months to complete any particular course. The courses are delivered and accessed entirely online and use the Moodle platform. Toronto eSchool accepts both full-time and part-time students and forwards marks to OUAC for any students applying to post-secondary institutions.

== Tutoring Centre ==
Toronto eSchool Tutoring Centre offers both traditional tutoring for all subjects as well as Maximize Your Success programs. Traditional tutoring is available in individual or small group settings for all elementary school and high school subjects. Maximize Your Success programs are specific programs geared to maximize individual students’ academic marks in all subject areas. This program addresses areas of need not addressed by traditional tutoring programs and is available via seminars/webinars, workshops, and customized classes. Test preparation classes are also available for IELTS, OSSLT, EQAO and high school exams.

== History ==
Toronto eSchool was founded in 2013 in Toronto, Ontario, Canada by Demosthenes Aliferis, who also became the Founding Principal. In 2016, a majority share of the company was purchased by China Youth Langton (Canada) Education Technology Ltd., a subsidiary of Farvision Education Group. In 2016, Toronto eSchool moved into its new campus in Toronto, Ontario. Its new facility boasts over 60,000 square feet of space. Current renovations are preparing the facility for rapid expansion into the international market and the launching of various innovative tutoring programs geared to maximize student success.
