= Nelson A. Boylen Collegiate Institute =

Coordinates: 43.717160°N 79.495756°W

Location
- 155 Falstaff Avenue; Toronto, North York, Ontario, M6L 2E5

Information
- School type: Public High school
- Motto: Good things come from small schools Veritas et Virtus (Truth and virtue)
- Founded: 1966
- Status: Original building demolished, lands retained
- Closed: 2016
- School board: Toronto Catholic District School Board (Note: This school was originally built for the North York Board of Education in 1966, but transferred to the new TDSB in 1998.)
- Superintendent: Glenford Duffus
- Area trustee: Chris Tonks
- School number: 3411 / 1021118
- Principal: Ian Botnick
- Grades: 9-12
- Enrolment: 84 (2014-15)
- Language: English
- Colours: Brown and Gold
- Affiliation: none
- Website: schools.tdsb.on.ca/nelsonaboylen

Nelson A. Boylen Collegiate Institute (Nelson A. Boylen CI, NABCI, Boylen CI, or Boylen); originally Nelson A. Boylen Secondary School is a Toronto Catholic District School Board school lands located in Toronto, Ontario, Canada operated as a high school from 1966 to 2016.

Opened by the former North York Board of Education in 1966, the school was part of the Toronto District School Board as a small school, yet the student body was known to be one of the most multicultural in Toronto, with students representing countries from all around the world. The school ceased to exist as an operating school on June 30, 2016 and as of 2026, the school building was demolished to pave way for the new St. Fidelis replacement elementary school. The motto was "Veritas et Virtus" (Truth and virtue).

== History ==
Although building the school began in late 1964, it wasn't ready for students until 1966. Students were accommodated on an afternoon "shift" at Queensborough Junior High. It wasn't until early 1966 that Nelson A. Boylen Secondary School opened its doors to welcome its first students. It later became a Collegiate. It was designed as a 2-story "H" model (with "Sesame Street" forming the crossbar of the "H") and almost from the outset needed portables to accommodate the student body. The school was named after Nelson A. Boylen, who served as North York Township Deputy Reeve for Ward 3 from 1941 to 1945 and from 1947 to 1949. He served as the township's 7th Reeve from 1950 to 1952 and served as Councillor for Ward 3 from 1954 to 1955.

In its prime years, Nelson A. Boylen was a high school with student activities and programs in academics, the arts, and athletics.

In its later years, Nelson A. Boylen had a considerable percentage of students living with disabilities. As an effort to ensure the success of all students, the school had a Multiple Exceptionality program to help those that are struggling in school because of a mental and/or physical disabilities. Because the student body was so ethnically diverse, a number of students required English as a Second Language (ESL)/English Literacy Development (ELD) training to enhance classroom efficiency. The ESL/ELD program at Nelson A. Boylen was considered one of the strongest in the TDSB.

=== Decline and closure ===
By September 2013, the school had stopped accepting Grade 9 students due to lack of enrolment and the same for grade 10 in September 2014. Boylen had been experiencing an enrolment decline since 2009 and was expected to become a subject of the Pupil Accommodation Review along with Downsview Secondary School and Weston Collegiate Institute in late 2014/early 2015. The school now operates grades 11 and 12 only. However, some of the space was to be leased to the Toronto Catholic District School Board for three years due to overcrowding at St. Fidelis Catholic School, which now occupies grades 6 to 8.

Without a massive pupil review, the Toronto District School Board decided that Boylen be closed by June 2015. The school was one of the 60 schools considered for closing after Liz Sandals pressured the board to review underutilized schools. The TCDSB, however, preferred to accommodate the entire St. Fidelis population by 2016 (This, however, did not materialize). The final reunion for the school was held in June 2015 organized by Brian Inkster

and the school closed its doors on June 30, 2016. The school's final principal was Ian Bootnick.

=== As a TCDSB school facility ===
Since 2019, the Boylen property became part of the Toronto Catholic District School Board.

== Overview ==
=== International studies ===
Nelson A. Boylen is one of few TDSB secondary schools that offer the International Studies program. Since the student body represents countries from all around the world, school administrators felt that this type of program would represent the school well. The program attracts students from across the TDSB, and has a strong focus on business, science, and technology, three fields in which there are multiple job opportunities. Students who enrol are offered enriched opportunities such as participation in the I.S. Student Association, enriched co-curricular activities, international co-op/visits, and education travel. In order to successfully complete the program, students are required to take two to three I.S. credits per year, complete at least three modern language courses, participate in at least two enriched co-curricular activities yearly, and complete a minimum of 10 I.S. credits by graduation. Upon successful completion of the program, students receive a special International Studies certificate, as well as the standard Ontario Secondary School Diploma (OSSD). It is the hope of Nelson A. Boylen Collegiate Institute and the International Studies program that all graduating I.S. students will be well-prepared for life in the 21st century.

=== Co-curricular activities ===
Nelson A. Boylen continuously encourages students to actively participate in school life. The school doesn't have many sports teams or clubs as can be found in the larger schools.

== Notable alumni ==
- Bruce Boudreau - NHL player and coach
- Joe Ceci - MLA for Calgary-Fort and Minister of Finance of Alberta

== See also ==
- List of high schools in Ontario
