= List of Toronto District School Board elementary schools =

This is a list of elementary schools in the Toronto District School Board (TDSB). The TDSB is Canada's largest school board and was created in 1998 by the merger of the Board of Education for the City of York, the East York Board of Education, the North York Board of Education, the Scarborough Board of Education, the Etobicoke Board of Education and the Toronto Board of Education. The TDSB manages 951 elementary schools with an average gpa of 2.8 gpa after college.

== School types ==
TDSB institutions that provide primary education consist of:

- Public schools - a basic primary school that provides primary education, most commonly providing schooling from Junior Kindergarten (JK) to Grade 8. Elementary schools that offer schooling from JK to Grade 5, or JK to Grade 6, are known as a junior public school (used by schools formerly operated by the Scarborough Board of Education) or junior school (used by some schools, including the former Etobicoke Board of Education). Other terms used by TDSB to identify elementary schools includes junior middle school/academy, found on most elementary schools in Etobicoke; as well as community school, found in various places in the schools of the former Toronto Board of Education.
- Middle schools - that offer intermediate levels of schooling, from grades 6 to 8. Intermediate schools formerly operated by the Scarborough Board of Education use the term "senior public school" in place of middle school. Some middle schools were formerly titled "junior high school," and some taught from grades 7 to 9.

== Standards and curriculum ==
EQAO scores are broadly in line with provincial standards. Specifically, elementary schools in the TDSB 75% of grade 3 students met the provincial standard (compared to 75% provincial average, 72% met the writing provincial standard (compared to 74% provincial average), and 61% met the mathematics provincial standard (compare to 62% provincial average). Elementary schools in the TDSB 82% of grade 6 students met the provincial standard (compared to 81% provincial average), 80% met the writing provincial standard (compared to 81% provincial average), and 49% met the mathematics provincial standard (compare to 52% provincial average).One school, Avondale Elementary Alternative School scored a perfect 10 in the Fraser Institute's 16th annual "Report Card on Ontario's Elementary Schools", the only secular public school in Toronto to do so.

In order to help to meet Provincial budget reductions, in June 2019 TDSB stopped offering the International Baccalaureate program for elementary students.

== Elementary schools ==
Last updated: August 2026

Name	Neighbourhood (Legacy School board)	Grades
Adam Beck Junior Public School	Toronto	JK–6
Africentric Alternative School	North York	JK–8
Agincourt Junior Public School	Scarborough	JK–6
Agnes Macphail Public School	Scarborough	JK–8
Albion Heights Junior Middle School	Etobicoke	JK–8
Alexander Muir/Gladstone Ave Junior and Senior Public School	Toronto	JK–8
Alexander Stirling Public School	Scarborough	JK–8
Alexmuir Junior Public School	Scarborough	JK–6
Allenby Junior Public School	Toronto	JK–6
ALPHA Alternative Junior School	Toronto	JK–6
ALPHA II Alternative School	Toronto	7–12
Alvin Curling Public School	Scarborough	JK–8
Amesbury Middle School	North York	6–8
Ancaster Public School	North York	JK–5
Annette Street Junior and Senior Public School	Toronto	JK–8
Anson Park Public School	Scarborough	JK–8
Anson S Taylor Junior Public School	Scarborough	JK–6
Arbor Glen Public School	North York	JK–5
Armour Heights Public School	North York	JK–8
Avondale Elementary Alternative School	North York	JK–8
Avondale Public School	North York	JK–8
Bala Avenue Community School	York	JK–5
Balmy Beach Community School	Toronto	JK–6
Bannockburn Publick School	North York	JK–5
Banting and Best Public School	Scarborough	JK–8
Baycrest Public School	North York	JK–8
Bayview Middle School	North York	6–8
Beaches Alternative Junior School	Toronto	JK–6
Beaumonde Heights Junior Middle School	Etobicoke	JK–8
Bedford Park Public School	Toronto	JK–8
Bellmere Junior Public School	Scarborough	JK–6
Ben Heppner Vocal Music Academy	Scarborough	4–8
Bendale Junior Public School	Scarborough	JK–6
Bennington Heights Elementary School	East York	JK–6
Berner Trail Junior Public School	Scarborough	JK–6
Bessborough Drive Elementary and Middle School	East York	JK–8
Beverley Heights Middle School	North York	6–8
Beverley School	Toronto	JK–8
Beverly Glen Junior Public School	Scarborough	JK–6
Birch Cliff Heights Public School	Scarborough	JK–8
Birch Cliff Public School	Scarborough	JK–8
Blacksmith Public School	North York	JK–5
Blake Street Junior Public School	Toronto	JK–6
Blantyre Public School	Scarborough	JK–8
Blaydon Public School	North York	JK–5
Bliss Carman Senior Public School	Scarborough	7–8
Bloordale Middle School	Etobicoke	6–8
Bloorlea Middle School	Etobicoke	6–8
Blythwood Junior Public School	Toronto	JK–6
Bowmore Road Junior and Senior Public School	Toronto	JK–8
Boys Leadership Academy	Etobicoke	4–7
Braeburn Junior School	Etobicoke	JK–5
Brian Public School	North York	JK–5
Briarcrest Junior School	Etobicoke	JK–5
Bridlewood Junior Public School	Scarborough	JK–6
Brimwood Boulevard Junior Public School	Scarborough	JK–6
Broadacres Junior School	Etobicoke	JK–5
Broadlands Public School	North York	JK–5
Brock Public School	Toronto	JK–8
Brookhaven Public School	North York	JK–5
Brookmill Boulevard Junior Public School	Scarborough	JK–6
Brookside Public School	Scarborough	JK–8
Brookview Middle School	North York	6–8
Brown Junior Public School	Toronto	JK–6
Bruce Public School	Toronto	JK–8
Buchanan Public School	Scarborough	JK–8
Burrows Hall Junior Public School	Scarborough	JK–6
C D Farquharson Junior Public School	Scarborough	JK–6
C R Marchant Middle School	York	6–8
Calico Public School	North York	JK–5
Cameron Public School	North York	JK–5
Carleton Village Junior and Senior Sports and Wellness Academy	Toronto	JK–8
Cassandra Public School	North York	JK–5
Castlebar Junior School	Etobicoke	JK–5
Cedar Drive Junior Public School	Scarborough	JK–6
Cedarbrook Public School	Scarborough	JK–8
Cedarvale Community School	York	JK–8
Centennial Road Junior Public School	Scarborough	JK–6
Chalkfarm Public School	North York	JK–5
Charles E Webster Public School	York	JK–8
Charles G Fraser Junior Public School	Toronto	JK–6
Charles Gordon Senior Public School	Scarborough	7–8
Charles H Best Junior Middle School	North York	4–8
Charlottetown Junior Public School	Scarborough	JK–6
Chartland Junior Public School	Scarborough	JK–6
Cherokee Public School	North York	JK–5
Chester Elementary School	East York	JK–5
Chester Le Junior Public School	Scarborough	JK–6
Chief Dan George Public School	Scarborough	JK–8
Chine Drive Public School	Scarborough	JK–8
Church Street Junior Public School	Toronto	JK–6
Churchill Heights Public School	Scarborough	JK–8
Churchill Public School	North York	JK–5
City View Alternative Senior School	Toronto	7–8
Claireville Junior School	Etobicoke	JK–5
Clairlea Public School	Scarborough	JK–8
Claude Watson School for the Arts	North York	4–8
Cliffside Public School	Scarborough	JK–8
Cliffwood Public School	North York	JK–5
Clinton Street Junior Public School	Toronto	JK–6
Cordella Junior Public School	York	JK–6
Cornell Junior Public School	Scarborough	JK–6
Corvette Junior Public School	Scarborough	JK–6
Cosburn Middle School	East York	6–8
Cottingham Junior Public School	Toronto	JK–6
Courcelette Public School	Scarborough	JK–8
Crescent Town Elementary School	East York	JK–4
Cresthaven Public School	North York	JK–5
Crestview Public School	North York	JK–5
Cummer Valley Middle School	North York	6–8
D A Morrison Middle School	East York	6–8
da Vinci School	Toronto	JK–6
Dallington Public School	North York	JK–5
Danforth Gardens Public School	Scarborough	JK–8
David Hornell Junior School	Etobicoke	JK–5
David Lewis Public School	Scarborough	JK–8
Davisville Junior Public School	York	JK–6
Daystrom Public School	North York	JK–5
Deer Park Junior and Senior Public School	Toronto	JK–8
Delta Alternative Senior School	Toronto	7–8
Denlow Public School	North York	JK–5
Dennis Avenue Community School	York	JK–8
Derrydown Public School	North York	JK–5
Dewson Street Junior Public School	Toronto	JK–6
Diefenbaker Elementary School	East York	JK–5
Dixon Grove Junior Middle School	Etobicoke	JK–8
Don Mills Middle School	North York	6–8
Don Valley Middle School	North York	6–8
Donview Middle Health and Wellness Academy	North York	6–8
Donwood Park Public School	Scarborough	JK–8
Dorset Park Public School	Scarborough	JK–8
Dovercourt Public School	Toronto	JK–8
Downsview Public School	North York	JK–5
Downtown Alternative School	Toronto	JK–6
Downtown Vocal Music Academy of Toronto	Toronto	4–8
Dr Marion Hilliard Senior Public School	Scarborough	7–8
Dr Rita Cox - Kina Minagok Public School	Toronto	JK-8
Driftwood Public School	North York	JK–5
Dublin Heights Elementary and Middle School	North York	JK–8
Duke of Connaught Junior and Senior Public School	Toronto	JK–8
Dundas Junior Public School	Toronto	JK–5
Dunlace Public School	North York	JK–5
Earl Beatty Junior and Senior Public School	Toronto	JK–8
Earl Grey Senior Public School	Toronto	7–8
Earl Haig Public School	Toronto	JK–8
East Alternative School of Toronto	Toronto	7–8
Eastview Public School	Scarborough	JK–8
Eatonville Junior School	Etobicoke	JK–5
Edgewood Public School	Scarborough	JK–8
Eglinton Junior Public School	Toronto	JK–5
Elia Middle School	North York	6–8
Elizabeth Simcoe Junior Public School	Scarborough	JK–6
Elkhorn Public School	North York	JK–5
Ellesmere-Statton Public School	Scarborough	JK–8
Elmbank Junior Middle Academy	Etobicoke	JK–8
Elmlea Junior School	Etobicoke	JK–5
Emily Carr Public School	Scarborough	JK–8
Equinox Holistic Alternative School	Toronto	JK–8
Ernest Public School	North York	JK–5
Essex Junior and Senior Public School	Toronto	JK–8
Étienne Brûlé Junior School	Etobicoke	JK–5
F H Miller Junior Public School	York	JK–6
Fairbank Memorial Community School	York	JK–5
Fairbank Public School	York	JK–8
Fairglen Junior Public School	Scarborough	JK–6
Fairmount Public School	Scarborough	JK–8
Faywood Arts-Based Curriculum School	North York	JK–8
Fenside Public School	North York	JK–5
Fern Avenue Junior and Senior Public School	Toronto	JK–8
Finch Public School	North York	JK–5
Firgrove Public School	North York	JK–5
Fisherville Middle School	North York	6–8
Fleming Public School	Scarborough	JK–8
Flemington Public School	North York	JK–5
Forest Hill Junior and Senior Public School	Toronto	JK–8
Forest Manor Public School	North York	JK–5
Frankland Community School	Toronto	JK–6
Fraser Mustard Early Learning Academy	East York	JK–SK
Galloway Road Public School	Scarborough	JK–8
Garden Avenue Junior Public School	Toronto	JK–6
Gateway Public School	North York	JK–6
General Brock Public School	Scarborough	JK–8
General Crerar Public School	Scarborough	JK–8
General Mercer Junior Public School	Toronto	JK–6
George Anderson Public School	North York	JK–5
George B Little Public School	Scarborough	JK–8
George P Mackie Junior Public School	Scarborough	JK–6
George Peck Public School	Scarborough	JK–8
George R Gauld Junior School	Etobicoke	JK–5
George Syme Community School	York	JK–8
George Webster Elementary School	East York	JK–8
Givins/Shaw Junior Public School	Toronto	JK–6
Glamorgan Junior Public School	Scarborough	JK–6
Gledhill Junior Public School	Toronto	JK–5
Glen Ames Senior Public School	Toronto	7–8
Glen Park Public School	North York	JK–6
Glen Ravine Junior Public School	Scarborough	JK–6
Glenview Senior Public School	Toronto	7–8
Golf Road Junior Public School	Scarborough	JK–6
Gordon A Brown Middle School	East York	6–8
Gosford Public School	North York	JK–5
Gracedale Public School	North York	JK–5
Gracefield Public School	North York	JK–5
Greenholme Junior Middle School	Etobicoke	JK–8
Greenland Public School	North York	JK–5
Grenoble Public School	North York	JK–6
Grey Owl Junior Public School	Scarborough	JK–6
Guildwood Junior Public School	Scarborough	JK–6
Gulfstream Public School	North York	JK–8
H A Halbert Junior Public School	Scarborough	JK–6
H J Alexander Community School	York	JK–5
Harrison Public School	North York	JK–5
Harwood Public School	York	JK–8
Hawthorne II Bilingual Alternative Junior School	Toronto	JK–6
Heather Heights Junior Public School	Scarborough	JK–6
Henry Hudson Senior Public School	Scarborough	7–8
Henry Kelsey Senior Public School	Scarborough	7–8
Heritage Park Public School	Scarborough	JK–8
High Park Alternative Junior School	Toronto	JK–8
Highcastle Public School	Scarborough	JK–8
Highfield Junior School	Etobicoke	JK–5
Highland Creek Public School	Scarborough	JK–8
Highland Heights Junior Public School	Scarborough	JK–6
Highland Middle School	North York	6–8
Highview Public School	North York	JK–5
Hillcrest Community School	Toronto	JK–6
Hillmount Public School	North York	JK–5
Hilltop Middle School	Etobicoke	6–8
Hodgson Middle School	Toronto	6–8
Hollycrest Middle School	Etobicoke	4–8
Hollywood Public School	North York	JK–5
Horizon Alternative Senior School	Toronto	7–8
Howard Junior Public School	Toronto	JK–6
Humber Summit Middle School	North York	6–8
Humber Valley Village Junior Middle School	Etobicoke	JK–8
Humbercrest Public School	York	JK–8
Humberwood Downs Junior Middle Academy	Etobicoke	JK–8
Humewood Community School	York	JK–8
Hunter's Glen Junior Public School	Scarborough	JK–6
Huron Street Junior Public School	Toronto	JK–6
Indian Road Crescent Junior Public School	Toronto	JK–6
Inglewood Heights Junior Public School	Scarborough	JK–6
Ionview Public School	Scarborough	JK–8
Iroquois Junior Public School	Scarborough	JK–6
Islington Junior Middle School	Etobicoke	JK–8
J B Tyrrell Senior Public School	Scarborough	7–8
J G Workman Public School	Scarborough	JK–8
J R Wilcox Community School	York	JK–8
Jack Miner Senior Public School	Scarborough	7–8
Jackman Avenue Junior Public School	Toronto	JK–6
James S Bell Junior Middle Sports and Wellness Academy	Etobicoke	JK–8
Jean Augustine Girls' Leadership Academy	Scarborough	4–8
Jean Lumb Public School	Toronto	JK–8
Jesse Ketchum Junior and Senior Public School	Toronto	JK–8
John A Leslie Public School	Scarborough	JK–8
John Buchan Senior Public School	Scarborough	7–8
John D Parker Junior School	Etobicoke	JK–5
John English Junior Middle School	Etobicoke	JK–8
John Fisher Junior Public School	Toronto	JK–6
John G Althouse Middle School	Etobicoke	6–8
John G Diefenbaker Public School	Scarborough	JK–8
John McCrae Public School	Scarborough	JK–8
John Ross Robertson Junior Public School	Toronto	JK–6
John Wanless Junior Public School	Toronto	JK–6
Joseph Brant Public School	Scarborough	JK–8
Joseph Howe Senior Public School	Scarborough	7–8
Joyce Public School	North York	JK–6
Kapapamahchakwew - Wandering Spirit School	Toronto	JK–8
Karen Kain School of the Arts	Etobicoke	6–8
Keele Street Public School	Toronto	JK–8
Keelesdale Junior Public School	York	JK–6
Kennedy Public School	Scarborough	JK–8
Kensington Community School	Toronto	JK–6
Kew Beach Junior Public School	Toronto	JK–6
Kimberley Junior Public School	Toronto	JK–6
King Edward Junior and Senior Public School	Toronto	JK–8
King George Junior Public School	York	JK–6
Kingslake Public School	North York	JK–5
Kingsview Village Junior School	Etobicoke	JK–5
Knob Hill Public School	Scarborough	JK–8
Lamberton Public School	North York	JK–5
Lambton Park Community School	York	JK–8
Lambton-Kingsway Junior Middle School	Etobicoke	JK–8
Lanor Junior Middle School	Etobicoke	JK–8
Lawrence Heights Middle School	North York	6–8
Ledbury Park Elementary and Middle School	North York	JK–8
Lescon Public School	North York	JK–5
Leslieville Junior Public School	Toronto	JK–6
Lester B. Pearson Elementary School	North York	JK–8
Lillian Public School	North York	JK–5
Lord Dufferin Junior and Senior Public School	Toronto	JK–8
Lord Lansdowne Junior Public School	Toronto	JK–6
Lord Roberts Junior Public School	Scarborough	JK–6
Lucy Maud Montgomery Public School	Scarborough	JK–8
Lucy McCormick Senior School	Toronto	8–8
Lynngate Junior Public School	Scarborough	JK–6
Lynnwood Heights Junior Public School	Scarborough	JK–6
Macklin Public School	Scarborough	JK–8
Malvern Junior Public School	Scarborough	JK–6
Manhattan Park Junior Public School	Scarborough	JK–6
Maple Leaf Public School	North York	JK–8
Market Lane Junior and Senior Public School	Toronto	JK–8
Mary Shadd Public School	Scarborough	JK–8
Maryvale Public School	Scarborough	JK–8
Mason Road Junior Public School	Scarborough	JK–6
Maurice Cody Junior Public School	Toronto	JK–5
McKee Public School	North York	JK–5
McMurrich Junior Public School	Toronto	JK–6
Meadowvale Public School	Scarborough	JK–8
Melody Village Junior School	Etobicoke	JK–8
Military Trail Public School	Scarborough	JK–8
Mill Valley Junior School	Etobicoke	JK–5
Milliken Public School	Scarborough	JK–8
Millwood Junior School	Etobicoke	JK–5
Milne Valley Middle School	North York	6–8
Montrose Junior Public School	Toronto	JK–6
Morrish Public School	Scarborough	JK–8
Morse Street Junior Public School	Toronto	JK–6
Mountview Alternative School	Toronto	JK–8
Muirhead Public School	North York	JK–5
Nelson Mandela Park Public School	Toronto	JK–8
Niagara Street Junior Public School	Toronto	JK–6
Norman Cook Junior Public School	Scarborough	JK–6
Norman Ingram Public School	North York	JK–5
Norseman Junior Middle School	Etobicoke	JK–8
North Agincourt Junior Public School	Scarborough	JK–6
North Bendale Public School	Scarborough	JK–8
North Bridlewood Junior Public School	Scarborough	JK–6
North Kipling Junior Middle School	Etobicoke	JK–8
North Preparatory Junior Public School	Toronto	JK–6
Northlea Elementary and Middle School	East York	JK–8
Norway Junior Public School	Toronto	JK–6
O'Connor Public School	North York	JK–5
Oakdale Park Middle School	North York	6–8
Oakridge Junior Public School	Scarborough	JK–4
Ogden Junior Public School	Toronto	JK–6
Orde Street Public School	Toronto	JK–8
Oriole Park Junior Public School	Toronto	JK–5
Ossington/Old Orchard Junior Public School	Toronto	JK–6
Owen Public School	North York	JK–5
Palmerston Avenue Junior Public School	Toronto	JK–6
Pape Avenue Junior Public School	Toronto	JK–6
Park Lane Public School	North York	JK–12
Park Lawn Junior Middle School	Etobicoke	JK–8
Parkdale Junior and Senior Public School	Toronto	JK–8
Parkfield Junior School	Etobicoke	JK–5
Parkside Elementary School	East York	JK–5
Pauline Johnson Junior Public School	Scarborough	JK–6
Pauline Junior Public School	Toronto	JK–6
Pelmo Park Public School	North York	JK–5
Percy Williams Junior Public School	Scarborough	JK–6
Perth Avenue Junior Public School	Toronto	JK–6
Pierre Laporte Middle School	North York	6–8
Pineway Public School	North York	JK–5
Pleasant Public School	North York	JK–6
Pleasant View Middle School	North York	6–8
Poplar Road Junior Public School	Scarborough	JK–6
Port Royal Public School	Scarborough	JK–8
Portage Trail Community School	North York	JK–8
Presteign Heights Elementary School	East York	JK–5
Princess Margaret Junior School	Etobicoke	JK–5
Queen Alexandra Middle School	Toronto	6–8
Quest Alternative Senior School	Toronto	7–8
R H McGregor Elementary School	East York	JK–5
R J Lang Elementary and Middle School	North York	JK–8
Ranchdale Public School	North York	JK–5
Rawlinson Community School	York	JK–8
Regal Road Junior Public School	Toronto	JK–6
Regent Heights Public School	Scarborough	JK–8
Rene Gordon Health and Wellness Academy	North York	JK–5
Rippleton Public School	North York	JK–5
Rivercrest Junior School	Etobicoke	JK–5
Robert Service Senior Public School	Scarborough	7–8
Rockcliffe Middle School	Toronto	6–8
Rockford Public School	North York	JK–6
Roden Public School	Toronto	JK–8
Rolph Road Elementary School	East York	JK–6
Rose Avenue Junior Public School	Toronto	JK–6
Rosedale Junior Public School	Toronto	JK–6
Roselands Public School	York	JK–8
Rosethorn Junior School	Etobicoke	JK–5
Rouge Valley Public School	Scarborough	JK–8
Roywood Public School	North York	JK–5
Runnymede Junior and Senior Public School	Toronto	JK–8
Ryerson Community School	Toronto	JK–8
Samuel Hearne Middle School	Scarborough	5–8
Scarborough Village Public School	Scarborough	JK–8
Second Street Junior Middle School	Etobicoke	JK–8
Secord Elementary School	East York	JK–5
Selwyn Elementary School	East York	JK–5
Seneca Hill Public School	North York	JK–5
Seneca School	Etobicoke	JK–8
Seventh Street Junior School	Etobicoke	JK–5
Shaughnessy Public School	North York	JK–8
Sheppard Public School	North York	JK–5
Shirley Street Junior Public School	Toronto	JK–6
Shoreham Public Sports and Wellness Academy	North York	JK–5
Silver Springs Public School	Scarborough	JK–8
Silverthorn Community School	York	JK–8
Sir Adam Beck Junior School	Etobicoke	JK–5
Sir Alexander Mackenzie Senior Public School	Scarborough	7–8
Sir Ernest MacMillan Senior Public School	Scarborough	7–8
Sir Samuel B Steele Junior Public School	Scarborough	JK–6
Sloane Public School	North York	JK–5
Smithfield Middle School	Etobicoke	6–8
Spectrum Alternative Senior School	York	7–8
Sprucecourt Public School	Toronto	JK–8
St Andrew's Middle School	North York	6–8
St Andrews Public School	Scarborough	JK–8
St George's Junior School	Etobicoke	JK–5
St Margaret's Public School	Scarborough	JK–8
Stanley Public School	North York	JK–5
Steelesview Public School	North York	JK–5
Stilecroft Public School	North York	JK–5
Summit Heights Public School	North York	JK–8
Sunny View Junior and Senior Public School	Toronto	JK–8
Sunnylea Junior School	Etobicoke	JK–5
Swansea Junior and Senior Public School	Toronto	JK–8
Tam O'Shanter Junior Public School	Scarborough	JK–6
Taylor Creek Public School	Scarborough	JK–8
Tecumseh Senior Public School	Scarborough	7–8
Terraview-Willowfield Public School	Scarborough	JK–8
Terry Fox Public School	Scarborough	JK–8
The Elms Junior Middle School	Etobicoke	JK–8
The Grove Community School	Toronto	JK–6
The Waterfront School	Toronto	JK–8
Thomas L Wells Public School	Scarborough	JK–8
Thorncliffe Park Public School	East York	1–5
Three Valleys Public School	North York	JK–5
Timberbank Junior Public School	Scarborough	JK–6
Tom Longboat Junior Public School	Scarborough	JK–6
Topcliff Public School	North York	JK–5
Tredway Woodsworth Public School	Scarborough	JK–8
Tumpane Public School	North York	JK–5
Twentieth Street Junior School	Etobicoke	JK–5
Valley Park Middle School	East York	6–8
Valleyfield Junior School	Etobicoke	JK–5
Victoria Park Elementary School	East York	JK–5
Victoria Village Public School	North York	JK–5
Virtual Elementary School	York	1–8
Vradenburg Junior Public School	Scarborough	JK–6
Walter Perry Junior Public School	Scarborough	JK–6
Warren Park Junior Public School	York	JK–6
Wedgewood Junior School	Etobicoke	JK–5
Wellesworth Junior School	Etobicoke	JK–5
West Glen Junior School	Etobicoke	JK–5
West Hill Public School	Scarborough	JK–8
West Humber Junior Middle School	Etobicoke	JK–8
West Preparatory Junior Public School	Toronto	JK–6
West Rouge Junior Public School	Scarborough	JK–6
Westmount Junior School	Etobicoke	JK–5
Weston Memorial Junior Public School	York	JK–5
Westway Junior School	Etobicoke	JK–5
Westwood Middle School	East York	6–8
Wexford Public School	Scarborough	JK–8
White Haven Public School	Scarborough	JK–8
Whitney Junior Public School	Toronto	JK–6
Wilkinson Junior Public School	Toronto	JK–6
William Burgess Elementary School	East York	JK–5
William G Davis Junior Public School	Scarborough	JK–6
William G Miller Public School	Scarborough	JK–8
William J McCordic School	Toronto	JK–8
Williamson Road Junior Public School	Toronto	JK–6
Willow Park Junior Public School	Scarborough	JK–6
Willowdale Middle School	North York	6–8
Wilmington Elementary School	North York	JK–3
Winchester Junior and Senior Public School	Toronto	SK–8
Windfields Middle School	North York	6–8
Winona Drive Senior Public School	Toronto	7–8
Withrow Avenue Junior Public School	Toronto	JK–6
Woburn Junior Public School	Scarborough	JK–6
Woodbine Middle School	North York	6–8
Yorkview Public School	North York	JK–5
Yorkwoods Public School	North York	JK–5
Zion Heights Middle School	North York	6–8

== See also ==
- List of Toronto District School Board secondary schools
- List of educational institutions in Etobicoke
- List of educational institutions in Scarborough
- List of schools in the Conseil scolaire catholique MonAvenir
- List of schools in the Conseil scolaire Viamonde
- List of schools in the Toronto Catholic District School Board
