= Avondale Alternative Secondary School =

Avondale Secondary Alternative School

Location
- 24 Silverview Drive; Toronto, Ontario, M2N 2V4; Canada; 43.786261°N 79.411858°W

Information
- School type: Alternative public high school
- Motto: Educare Momentum (Each Moment Drips With Possibility)
- Founded: 1964
- School board: Toronto District School Board (North York Board of Education)
- Superintendent: Linda Curtis
- Area trustee: Alexander Brown
- School number: 3409 / 890120
- Principal: Ellen Walsh
- Grades: 10–12
- Enrolment: 74 (2015–16)
- Language: English
- Colours: Blue, Silver
- Website: schoolweb.tdsb.on.ca/avondalesa/Home.aspx

Avondale Secondary Alternative School is a public alternative school in Toronto, Ontario, Canada. It teaches grades 9 through 12. ASAS and its family schools, Avondale Elementary School and Avondale Alternative Elementary School, are part of the Toronto District School Board. Prior to 1998, the schools were part of the North York Board of Education. The school moved to 24 Silverview Drive in 2016.

== History ==
Avondale's predecessor, Alternative Independent Study Program (known by the acronym AISP), was the first Board of Education operated alternative school in North York and one of the first such high schools in Toronto. AISP was founded in 1971 to meet the increasing demand of the students of North York for alternative education. Following the apparent success of Shared Experience Exploration and Discovery (known as SEED) in the City of Toronto, the North York Board of Education agreed to create an alternative program which began in September 1971 with admission of the first Grade 11, 12 and 13 students. Attendance of the first 160 was determined by lottery of the students who wished to attend, and whose numbers exceeded the allotted amount. The school had a full complement of teachers and a Programme Director instead of a Principal. The founding Programme Director was the Board's former history co-ordinator Jack Gillette. Catalysts were qualified volunteers engaged to assist with teaching specialized courses designed by the students and given Ontario Ministry of Education approval. A reunion of the original 160 students and teachers took place in a private home in Toronto on November 5, 2011. Many of the original students, now in their mid to late fifties, and most of the original teachers including Jack Gillette were in attendance. AISP changed with the times and became Avondale Secondary Alternative School in the 80s. An earlier reunion of the students of AISP took place at the school on May 27, 2010.

To allow construction of the new Avondale (elementary) School building, the secondary schools was permanently relocated in the former Silverview Public School on 24 Silverview Drive on Yonge/Finch corridor.

== Curriculum ==
In addition to teaching all necessary courses required to earn an Ontario Secondary School Diploma, Avondale offers classes in guitar, drama, ceramics, drawing and painting, photography, French, business technology, law, philosophy, advanced functions, calculus and vectors, Canadian history, an introduction to anthropology, sociology, and psychology; biology, chemistry, physical education, gay and lesbian studies, and genocide and crimes against humanity. All classes are in the academic stream; applied and workplace classes must be taken via e-school or independent study.

Great emphasis is placed on dialog-based learning within classes, particularly humanities. Examples of this include informal lectures open to questioning and criticism, class discussion on texts and ideas, and structured debates and discussions as formal evaluations.

== Notable alumni ==
- MTV Movie Award-winning actor Keanu Reeves
- Science fiction writer and activist Cory Doctorow
- Juno Award-winning musician and entertainer David Gershon, of Judy & David
- Writer, editor, and writing teacher Stuart Ross
- Criminal lawyer, writer Robert Rotenberg
- Economist, writer Jeff Rubin
- Blues musician Colin Linden
- Popular Twitch personality Octavian Kripparrian Morosan
- Multiple Juno Award-winning cellist and Order of Canada recipient, Ofra Harnoy

== See also ==
- Education in Ontario
- List of secondary schools in Ontario
