= John Polanyi Collegiate Institute =

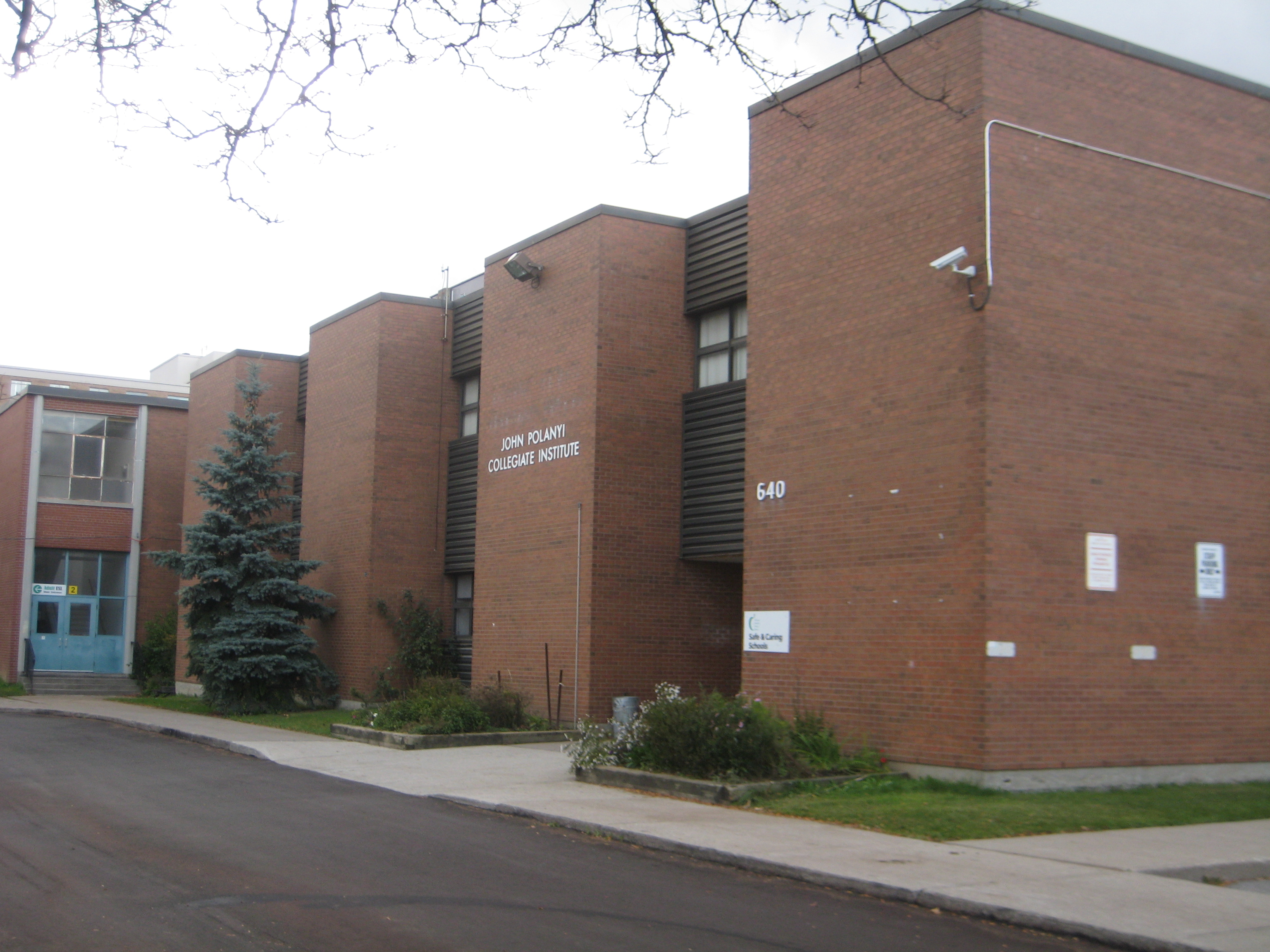
- John Polanyi C.I. occupies the former Bathurst Heights school.

Location
- 640 Lawrence Avenue West; Toronto, Ontario, M6A 1B1; Canada; 43.717586°N 79.440122°W

Information
- Former names: Sir Sanford Fleming Secondary School
- School type: High school
- Motto: Motto: Scientia Est Potentia ("Knowledge Is Power")
- Religious affiliation: Secular
- Founded: 1964
- Sister school: Flemington Public School and Lawrence Heights Middle School
- School board: Toronto District School Board (North York Board of Education)
- Superintendent: Curtis Ennis; LN04
- Area trustee: Shelley Laskin; Ward 8
- School number: 3437 / 906736
- Principal: Emily Saylor
- Grades: 9-12/13
- Language: English
- Colours: Blue and white
- Mascot: Jaguar
- Team name: Fleming Chargers (1964–2011); Polanyi Jaguars (2011–present)
- Rival: Downsview Secondary School
- Newspaper: The [Paw] Print
- Website: jpci.ca

John Polanyi Collegiate Institute (JPCI), formerly Sir Sandford Fleming Secondary School is a public high school in Toronto, Ontario, Canada. It is housed in the former Bathurst Heights Secondary School building. It is located in the North York district, near Lawrence Avenue West and Allen Road in the area of Lawrence Heights. Prior to 1998, the school was part of the North York Board of Education.

It is a semestered school offering a "full range of university, college and apprenticeship programs." The school was originally named after the Scottish-Canadian inventor of time zones Sandford Fleming.

== History ==
Sir Sandford Fleming Secondary School was constructed and opened in September 1964. The building shares the same design as Newtonbrook Secondary School. The teams name was known as the Chargers. On September 6, 2011, the school was renamed to John Polanyi Collegiate Institute with the Fleming staff and students moving into the former Bathurst Heights Secondary School on Lawrence and Allen. The name of the school team was changed to the Jaguars with their colours being blue and black.

=== Origins of Bathurst Heights ===
Bathurst Heights Secondary School opened on September 4, 1951, as North York's second high school (the first being Earl Haig Secondary School) and officially opened on May 29, 1952. Six additions were made throughout the years and adult education was introduced before the program being abolished in 2000. After years of enrolment declining, Bathurst Heights closed its doors as a regular operating school on June 23, 2001.

In 2004 the school was used in the filming of the Zero Hour episode: Massacre at Columbine High.

In the 2000s, the Toronto Catholic District School Board used the Bathurst Heights building to house the students from Brebeuf College School during re-construction and later Dante Alighieri Academy Beatrice Campus.

The school's building is now leased out by the Toronto District School Board to several tenants:

- Swim camp
- Toronto ESL Learning Centre

The school is currently being internally renovated to house TDSB offices.

== Notable alumni (Bathurst Heights) ==
- Rosalie Abella, justice of the Supreme Court of Canada
- Denham Brown, basketball player
- Paul Godfrey, municipal politician and newspaper publisher
- Urjo Kareda, late theatre and music critic
- Danny Livingstone, Antiguan cricketer
- Bob Nevin, late hockey player
- David Shiner, municipal politician

== See also ==
- Education in Ontario
- List of secondary schools in Ontario
