= Stuart Ross (writer) =

Canadian fiction writer, poet, editor, and creative-writing instructor

Stuart Ross is a Canadian fiction writer, poet, editor, and creative-writing instructor.

Ross was born in Toronto's north end in 1959 and grew up in the Borough of North York. He began writing at a very young age and was first published at age 16 by Books by Kids (now Annick Press). This book, The Thing in Exile, also contained work by teen writers Steven Feldman and Mark Laba. Ross attended Alternative Independent Study Program for high school. He went on to self-publish dozens of books and chapbooks through his Proper Tales Press imprint. As his books began to emerge from larger literary publishing houses, he has continued his Proper Tales Press project.

Ross has been active in the Toronto literary scene since the mid-1970s. He is co-founder, with Nicholas Power, of the Toronto Small Press Book Fair, which has been operating since 1987 under various directorships. This fair, the first of its kind in Canada, inspired similar events in Vancouver, Ottawa, and Hamilton. Ross is a founding member of the Meet the Presses collective, which formed in 2006 to promote small-press publishing in the Toronto area.

He was the 2002 "Writer in Residence" for the Writers' Circle of Durham Region, the 2003 "Poet in Residence" for the Ottawa International Writers Festival, and the 2005 Electronic Writer in Residence for the Toronto Public Library's RAMP website for teens. He was Queen's University at Kingston's writer in residence in 2010 and the writer in residence at the University of Ottawa in 2021. Stuart was the Fiction and Poetry Editor for This Magazine from 2004 until 2012, and from 2007 to 2016 he was Editor for Mansfield Press, where he had his own imprint: "a stuart ross book." In 2017, Ross launched a new imprint for surrealist poetry – A Feed Dog Book – through Anvil Press.

His own magazines have included Mondo Hunkamooga: A Journal of Small Press Reviews (later subtitled A Journal of Small Press Stuff), Peter O'Toole (a magazine of one-line poems), Dwarf Puppets on Parade (a magazine of writing with restrictions), Who Torched Rancho Diablo? (poetry and fiction), Syd & Shirley, a magazine of Canadian and American poetry, and HARDSCRABBLE, a poetry magazine.

Although primarily known as a poet, Ross has also published fiction and personal essays. His column "Hunkamooga" appeared in Word: Toronto's Literary Calendar from 2001 to 2005, and moved to the Vancouver-based literary magazine sub-Terrain in 2006, where it ran until 2012.

As an editor, Ross was responsible for the 2004 anthology Surreal Estate: 13 Canadian Poets Under the Influence. In 2003, he issued the chapbook anthology My Lump in the Bed: Love Poems for George W. Bush. In 2007, Ross was the editor for the Insomniac Press book Why Are You So Sad? Selected Poems of David W. McFadden, and in 2010 for the Insomniac Press book Why Are You So Long and Sweet? Collected Long Poems of David McFadden. With Stephen Brockwell, he is the editor of the Mansfield Press poetry anthology Rogue Stimulus: The Stephen Harper Holiday Anthology for a Prorogued Parliament. In 2017, Ross was the editor of Certain Details: Poetry of Nelson Ball, published by Wilfrid Laurier University Press.

His 2009 short-story collection, Buying Cigarettes for the Dog, was shortlisted for the Alberta Readers' Choice Award and the Alberta Book Awards, and won the 2010 ReLit Award for Short Fiction. In 2012, he co-won the Elaine Mona Adilman Award for English Fiction & Poetry on a Jewish Theme, awarded by the J.I. Segal Committee of the Jewish Public Library in Montreal, for his novel Snowball, Dragonfly, Jew. In spring 2013, Ross's poetry collection You Exist. Details Follow. won the Exist Through The Gift Shop Award, the only prize given to an anglophone writer that year by the Montreal-based group l'Académie de la vie littéraire au tournant du 21e siècle. In fall 2017, Ross's poetry collection A Sparrow Came Down Resplendent received the Canadian Jewish Literary Award in the poetry category. In September 2019, Ross was the recipient of the Harbourfront Festival Prize, awarded at the Toronto International Festival of Authors.

His 2019 collection Motel of the Opposable Thumbs was shortlisted for the 2020 ReLit Award for Poetry.

In 2023, Ross received the Trillium Book Award for his memoir The Book of Grief and Hamburgers. This annual award goes to one outstanding book published in Ontario in English and one in French.

== Selected bibliography ==
- The Thing in Exile. Books by Kids, 1976. (with Mark Laba and Steven Feldman)
- The Pig Sleeps. Contra Mundo Books, 1991. (with Mark Laba)
- The Mud Game. The Mercury Press, 1995. (with Gary Barwin)
- The Inspiration Cha-Cha. ECW Press, 1996.
- Henry Kafka and Other Stories. The Mercury Press, 1997.
- Farmer Gloomy's New Hybrid. ECW Press, 1999.
- Razovsky at Peace. ECW Press, 2001.
- Hey, Crumbling Balcony! Poems New & Selected. ECW Press, 2003.
- Surreal Estate: 13 Canadian Poets Under the Influence. The Mercury Press, 2004. (editor)
- Confessions of a Small Press Racketeer. Anvil Press, 2005.
- Robots at Night. Proper Tales Press, 2005.
- I Cut My Finger. Anvil Press, 2007.
- Dead Cars in Managua. DC Books, 2008.
- Rogue Stimulus: The Stephen Harper Holiday Anthology for a Prorogued Parliament. Mansfield Press, 2010. (editor, with Stephen Brockwell)
- Buying Cigarettes for the Dog. Freehand Books, 2009.
- I Have Come to Talk About Manners. Apt. 9 Press, 2010.
- Snowball, Dragonfly, Jew. ECW Press, 2011.
- You Exist. Details Follow. Anvil Press, 2012.
- 18 Goddamn Centos. Proper Tales Press, 2013.
- Our Days in Vaudeville. Mansfield Press, 2013. (with 29 collaborators)
- A Hamburger in a Gallery. DC Books, 2015.
- Further Confessions of a Small Press Racketeer. Anvil Press, 2015.
- My Planet of Kites. Mansfield Press, 2015. (co-translation, with Michelle Winters, of the poetry of Marie-Ève Comtois)
- A Sparrow Came Down Resplendent. Wolsak and Wynn, 2016.
- Pockets. ECW Press, 2017.
- Espesantes. above/ground Press, 2018.
- Motel of the Opposable Thumbs. Anvil Press, 2019.
- 90 Tiny Poems. above/ground Press, 2019.
- 70 Kippers: The Dagmar Poems. With Michael Dennis. Proper Tales Press, 2020.
- Sos una sola persona. Translated into Spanish by Tomás Downey and Sarah Moses. Socios Fundadores, 2020.
- The Book of Grief and Hamburgers. ECW Press, 2022.
- I Am Claude François and You Are a Bathtub. Anvil Press, 2022.
- The Sky Is a Sky in the Sky. Coach House Books, 2024.
