= Weston Collegiate Institute =

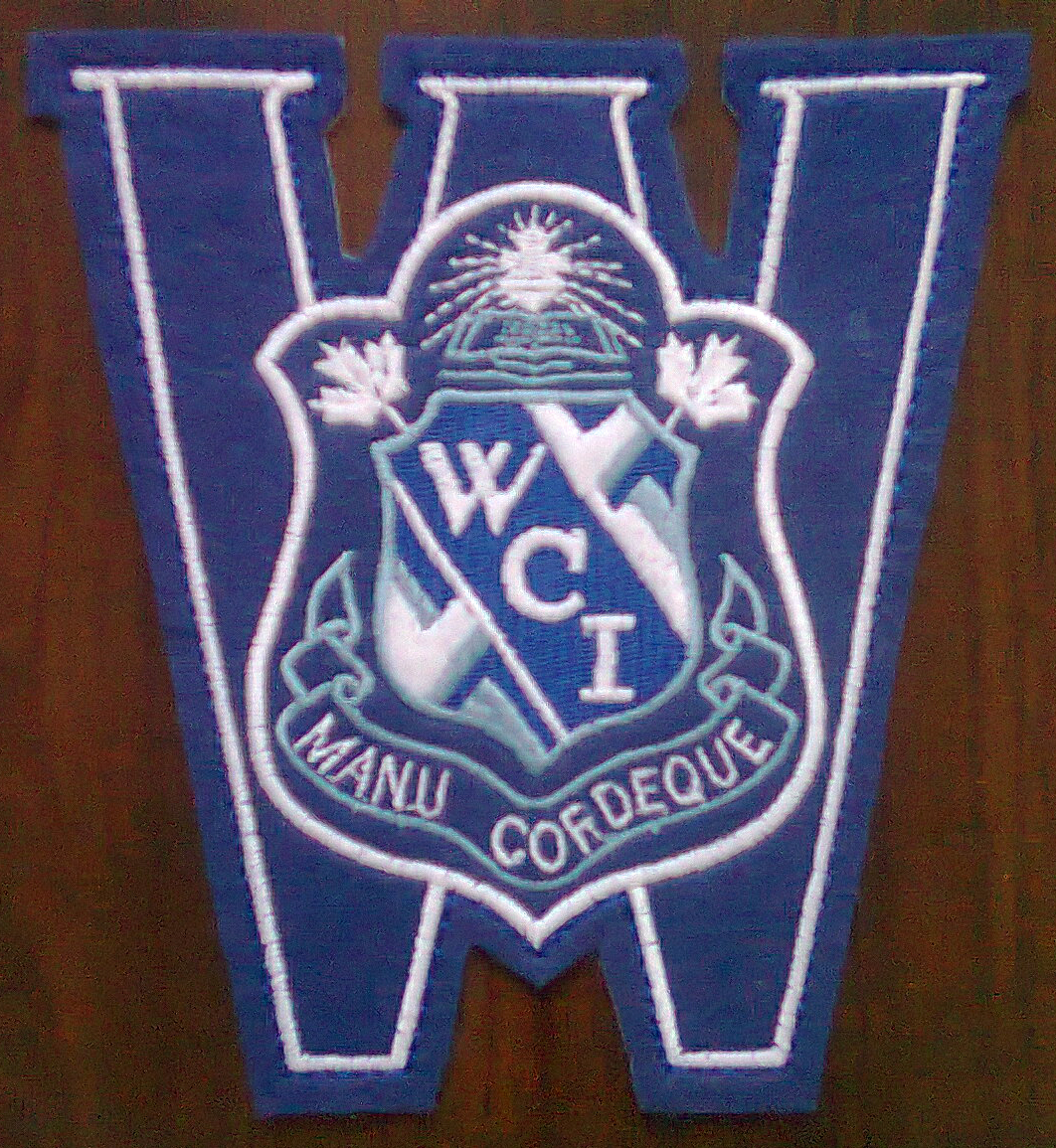

Location
- 100 Pine Street; Toronto, Ontario, M9N 2Y9; Canada; 43.703847°N 79.509316°W

Information
- Former names: Weston Grammar School (1857-1871); Weston High School (1871-1922); Weston High and Vocational School (1922-1939); Weston Collegiate and Vocational School (1939-1965)
- School type: High school
- Motto: Manu Cordeque ("With Hand and With Heart")
- Founded: 1857
- School board: Toronto District School Board
- Principal: Rosanna Deo
- Grades: 9-12
- Language: English
- Area: York South-Weston
- Colours: White and Blue
- Mascot: The Blue and White Ironman
- Team name: Weston Ironmen
- Website: www.westonci.ca
- Last updated: June 1, 2022

Weston Collegiate Institute (Weston C.I., WCI, Weston) is a Grade 9 to 12 public high school in Toronto, Ontario, Canada. It was formerly known by its previous names of Weston Grammar School, Weston High School, Weston High and Vocational School and Weston Collegiate and Vocational School. It is located in the York South-Weston area. It is the second-oldest high school in Toronto, after Jarvis Collegiate Institute. Weston CI is located on 100 Pine Street and has a student population of about 1043.

== History ==
Weston Collegiate Institute is the second-oldest secondary school in Toronto and the oldest in the former City of York, having been established in 1857 as Weston Grammar School. The school's activities and scholarships are supported by the Weston's Alumni Foundation. The school was renamed to Weston High School in 1871, then Weston High and Vocational School in 1922, and lastly to Weston Collegiate and Vocational School in 1939 before adopting its present name in 1965.

WCI displays an international focus as the student body representing over 80 countries in the world.

The original school building on King Street was built in 1858 and was replaced in January 1876 after a fire burned the original school on March 23, 1875. The enlarged school, Collegiate Gothic, designed by architect Stephen Burwell Coon, was built in 1913 facing William Street with six classrooms, an office, a science lab and an gymnatorium. In 1952-53, the building gained additional features such as more classrooms, auditorium, cafeteria, library, gymnasium, offices and music room. The school's modern facility was constructed in 1968 in the old track and field and was opened in September 1970. The brutalist building includes a library, auditorium, a large indoor pool, a full-sized field with surrounding track, a double gymnasium and a fitness/weight room.

In 2017, the school celebrated its 160th anniversary.

== International Baccalaureate program ==
The International Baccalaureate Program (also known as the IB Program) is a Graduate Diploma. It was introduced in March 1994 to Weston. All the teachers are specially selected and trained to support the International Baccalaureate program.

The IB Program at Weston Collegiate Institute is taught in English and taken in the latter two years of high school (i.e. Grades 11 and 12). However, due to its rigorous nature, Weston Collegiate Institute offers the Preparatory International Baccalaureate Program (also known as the Pre-IB Program) to students. The Pre-IB Program is largely recommended to students, but entry into the IB program without Pre-IB may be accepted. All IB courses are offered at the enriched level, which greatly exceeds the expectations of the Ontario Secondary School curriculum. By Grade 12, all students study at the university-level, leading some universities to offer advanced standing for Higher Level subjects.

Students who are enrolled in the IB program receive both the International Baccalaureate Diploma and the Ontario Secondary School Diploma upon successful completion. Students are expected to study 3 subjects at the Higher Level (HL) and 3 at the Standard Level (SL). Students may also opt to complete 4 HL and 2 SL subjects if they wish although it is not recommended due to the potential for the exorbitant workload Successful completion of the IB program entails receiving passing grades on all written IB examinations, the Theory of Knowledge essay, and the Extended Essay, as well as 150 hours of volunteered community involvement in three areas (i.e. creativity, action, service; also known as CAS hours). In their final year, students write the official IB exams in May.

All IB students from Weston Collegiate Institute are accepted to their first choice universities and are offered substantial scholarships. In fact, the IB Department at Weston Collegiate Institute provides a number of IB Scholarships for outstanding IB students. Recipients are nominated by IB teachers, administrators, or students and selected by a committee of 5 members (i.e. IB Coordinator, 3 teachers, IB Parent Council parent representatives). The IB Scholarships are broken into the following categories: IB Ideal, Leadership, Most Improved, Creativity, Service, Academic.

=== Current IB subjects offered ===
In order to graduate as a diploma student, an IB candidate must take one (or two) science course(s), one math course, and one higher-level English course, Theory of Knowledge, as well as one secondary language (only French is offered at Weston).

Experimental Sciences

- Biology HL
- Biology SL
- Chemistry HL
- Chemistry SL
- Physics SL

Mathematics

- Math Studies SL
- Mathematics SL

Languages A1, A2, B

- English A1 HL (required)
- French B HL
- French B SL
- French AB initio

Individuals and Societies

- Socio-Cultural Anthropology HL
- Socio-Cultural Anthropology SL
- Information Technology in a Global Society SL
- Information Technology in a Global Society HL
- History SL
- History HL
- Theory of Knowledge (ToK; required)

== Athletics ==
- Cricket (indoors and outdoors)
- Football
- Basketball
- Soccer (indoors and outdoors)
- Baseball
- Golf
- Swimming
- Badminton
- Rugby
- Ice Hockey
- Volleyball (Co-ed)
- Cross-Country
- Track and Field
- Softball
- Slo-pitch

== Arts ==
- Dance Club
- Dramatic Arts Festivals
- Live Production/Plays
- Talent Shows
- Music Concert/Performances
- Computer/Graphic Arts
- Film/Video Workshops
- Media Art
- Photography
- Choir
- Ensemble
- Jazz Band
- Orchestra
- Strings

== Other recreational/co-curricular activities ==
- Student Activity Council (SAC)
- Weston Learning and Hangout Club (WLHC)
- IB Peer Mentorship Group
- Weston Heritage Club (WHC)
- French Club
- Queer Straight Alliance (QSA)
- Spanish Club
- ESL Club
- Sound, Light and Stage Crew Club
- Chess Club
- HSERT (High School Emergency Response Team)
- Student Newspaper Club
- Yearbook Club
- Weston Ambassadors
- Weston Buddies
- Robotics Club
- Computer Club/Team
- Weight Training Club
- Weston Heritage Club
- Dominoes Club
- Athletic Council
- Future Aces
- GO Club
- Student Council
- Truth and Reconciliation Committee
- Music Council
- Black Student Union
- Weston Cares for Children
- Eco Club
- Christian Club

== Community ==
Fundraisers

- We Heritage Foundation [Founded From Weston Heritage Club]
- Terry Fox Run
- UNICEF
- United Way
- CN Tower Climb
- 30 Hour Famine
- Canadian Cancer Society
- Free the Children
- WaterWise Organization (Student-Led Independent)

Caring

- Blood Drive
- Parenting Education in the Classroom
- Settlement Education Partnership Toronto (SEPT)
- Somali Youth Association of Toronto(SOYAT)
- Women's Habitat

Safe & Caring Schools

- Empowered Student Partnerships (ESP)
- Kids Help Phone
- Let's Stop the Bullying: Bully Prevention Program
- Me to We
- Parks and Recreation After school program
- Recognition Assemblies
- Recognition Awards Program
- Restorative Justice
- YOUCAN: Team Toronto, Peace Builders

== Notable faculty ==
- Bob Nadin – Ice hockey referee, and IIHF Hall of Fame inductee

== Notable alumni ==
- Esmond Butler – private secretary of Governor General (1954-1984), received Order of Canada in 1986
- Ed Chadwick – former goaltender with the Toronto Maple Leafs and Boston Bruins
- Sir James Alexander Lougheed – Northwest Territories/Alberta senator and federal cabinet minister
- Carline Muir – track and field athlete, competed in 2008 Beijing Olympics
- William Paris – fighter pilot and trainer of pilots, receive the Order of Canada in 1989
- Vera Peters – medical doctor, received Order of Canada in 1975
- Bob Pulford – NHL hockey player
- Sinclair Stevens (1927–2016) – lawyer, businessman and Federal Cabinet minister
- Carole Taylor – former Chair of the Board of Directors of the CBC and politician
- Elwy Yost (1925–2011) – TV Ontario movie reviewer

== See also ==
- Education in Ontario
- List of secondary schools in Ontario
