= York Mills Collegiate Institute =

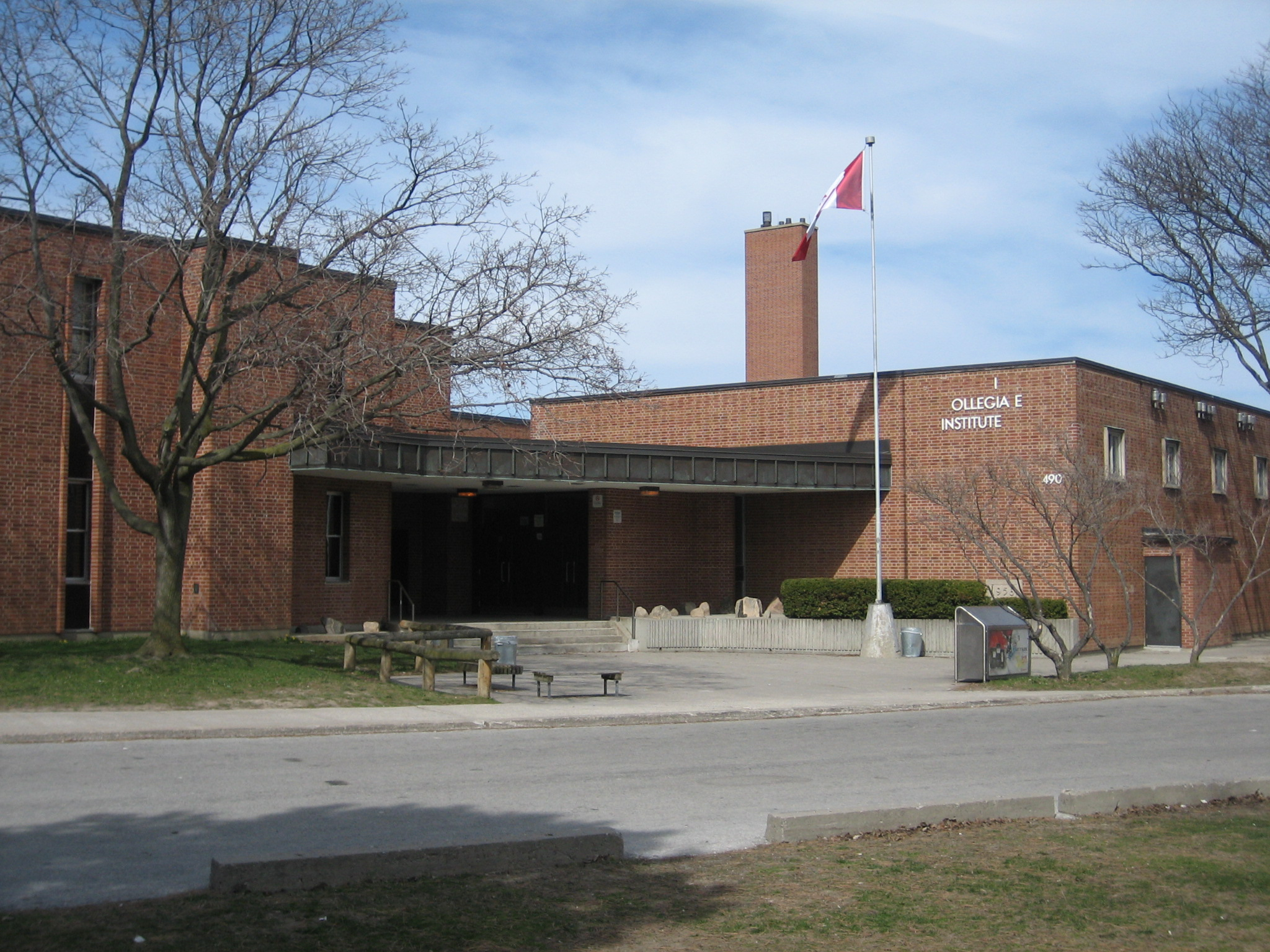

Location
- 490 York Mills Road; Toronto, Ontario, M3B 1W6; Canada

Information
- School type: Public, High school
- Motto: Labore et prudentia ("through effort and intelligence")
- Founded: 1957
- School board: Toronto District School Board (North York Board of Education)
- Superintendent: Ron Felsen; LN06
- Area trustee: Rachel Chernos Lin; Ward 11
- School number: 3450 / 954810
- Principal: Lesley Gage
- Grades: 9–12
- Enrolment: 1225
- Language: English and French
- Area: formerly City of North York; City of Toronto; Riding of Don Valley West; Toronto City Council Ward 13
- Colours: Red and White
- Mascot: The Titan
- Team name: York Mills Titans; York Mills Rubber Duckies (Swim Team)
- Feeder schools: Windfield MS; St. Andrew's MS; Don Valley MS (Only French Immersion)
- Website: Official website

York Mills Collegiate Institute is a public high school in Toronto, Ontario, Canada. It is part of the Toronto District School Board, offering grades 9–12. It is located in North York along York Mills Road between Leslie Street and Bayview Avenue. Prior to 1998, it was part of the North York Board of Education.

The school emphasizes university preparation and academics. English and French Immersion courses are provided from grades 9 to 12. Windfields Middle School (half French immersion and half English) and St. Andrews Middle School are the two feeder middle schools that make up the majority of York Mills' population. Additionally, Don Valley Middle School is a feeder school to York Mills with only its smaller population of French immersion students.

== Origins ==
York Mills Collegiate's building was designed by the British-Canadian architect Peter Dickinson. Construction began in 1956 and opened its doors on September 3, 1957. York Mills C.I. celebrated its 50th anniversary in 2007.

== Extracurricular activities ==
=== Sports ===
York Mills offers a wide variety of extracurricular sports, including: Badminton, Baseball, Softball, Basketball, Cross-country Running Team, Curling, Field Hockey (girls), Golf, Tennis, Hockey, Rugby, Soccer, Swimming, Water-Polo, Track and Field, Ultimate Frisbee, Volleyball, and Weight Training.

== Notable alumni ==
- John Bitove, businessman and sportsman
- Joana Ceddia - former media personality
- Jayne Eastwood - actress and comedian
- Cary Fagan - writer
- Elliotte Friedman Sportsnet hockey reporter & NHL Network insider
- Sasha Gollish – competitive runner
- Dave Hodge, sports announcer
- Young K – member of South Korean band Day6
- Terry Leibel, journalist and equestrian
- Sam Mizrahi - real estate developer
- Dan Shulman, Toronto Blue Jays & ESPN play-by-play announcer
- Jeffrey Skoll, engineer, entrepreneur, and filmproducer
- Laura Vandervoort - actor, producer, director, writer & Shotokan Karate Nidan
- Andy Yerzy (born 1998), baseball player in the Milwaukee Brewers organization
- Jean Yoon - actress and writer
- Mark Lutz - actor

== See also ==
- Education in Ontario
- List of secondary schools in Ontario
