= Westview Centennial Secondary School =

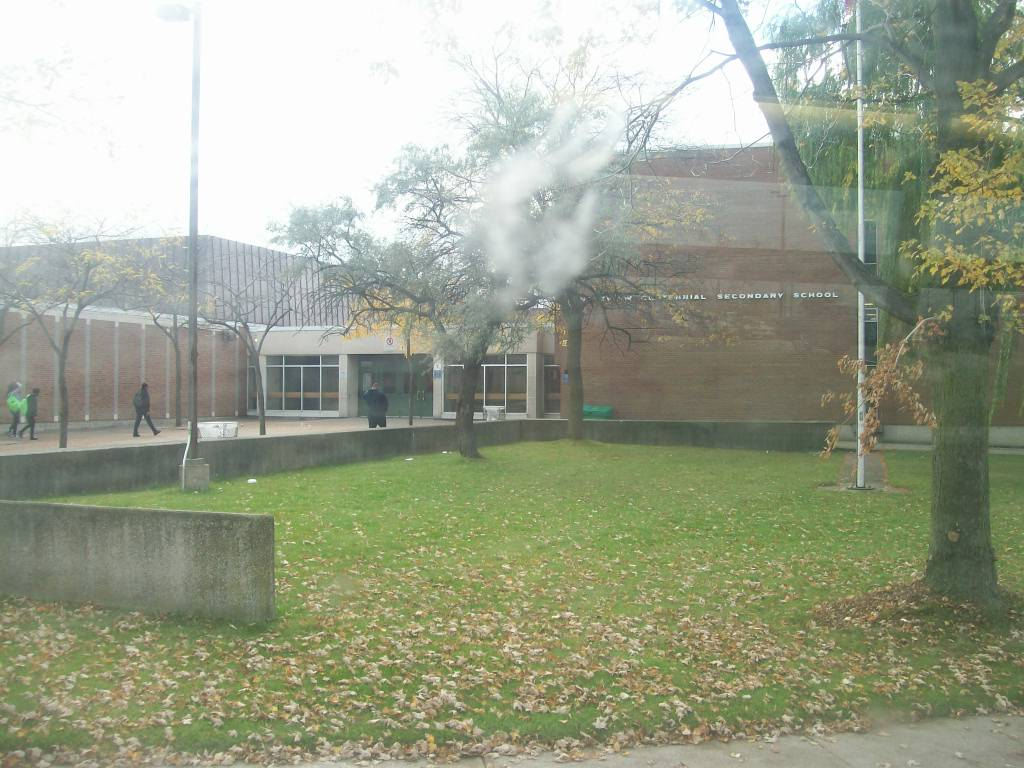

Location
- 755 Oakdale Road; Toronto, Ontario, M3N 1W7; Canada; 43.75252°N 79.52519°W

Information
- School type: Public, High school
- Motto: Nos Omnia Tentemus (Let Us Attempt All Things)
- Founded: 1967
- School board: Toronto District School Board (North York Board of Education)
- Superintendent: Kurt McIntosh
- Area trustee: Tiffany Ford
- School number: 3448 / 952818
- Principal: Rosalie Griffith
- Grades: 9-12
- Enrolment: 960 (2017-18)
- Language: English
- Schedule type: Semestered
- Classrooms: 69
- Area: Toronto
- Colours: Green, White and Black
- Mascot: Wildcat
- Team name: Westview Wildcats
- Website: schoolweb.tdsb.on.ca/westview

Westview Centennial Secondary School is a semestered public high school in Toronto, Ontario, Canada, under the sanction of the Toronto District School Board. It is located in the University Heights neighbourhood of North York.

== History ==
Westview Centennial was founded in 1967. The reason for Centennial being added to the school's name is that the school was built 100 years after the Canadian Confederation.

== Sport teams ==
- Basketball team
- Volleyball team
- Soccer team
- Track team
- Cross-Country team
- Ultimate Frisbee
- Swimming
- Wrestling
- Baseball Team
- Cricket Team
- Swim Team
- Badminton team

== Alumni ==
- Nora Fatehi, Actress, dancer, producer and singer in Bollywood.
- Jason Allison, NHL player
- Carlos Newton, mixed martial artist, former UFC welterweight champion
- Chuckie Akenz, rapper
- Sergio Trujillo, Broadway choreographer
- Donovan "Razor" Ruddock, (born December 21, 1963), professional boxer who competed from 1982 to 2001, and in 2015

== See also ==
- Education in Ontario
- List of secondary schools in Ontario
