= George S. Henry Academy =

Location
- 200 Graydon Hall Drive; Toronto, Ontario, M3A 3A6; Canada; 43°45′49″N 79°20′24″W

Information
- School type: Public, High school
- Motto: Studere est Excellere (To Strive is to Excel)
- Religious affiliation: none
- Founded: September 7, 1965
- School board: Toronto District School Board
- Superintendent: Kurt McIntosh
- Area trustee: Farzana Rajwani
- School number: 912301
- Principal: Laura Pagnotta
- Grades: 9–12
- Enrolment: 435 (2020)
- Language: English
- Schedule type: Semestered
- Team name: Henry Aces
- Website: schoolweb.tdsb.on.ca/georgeshenry
- Last updated: April 23, 2025

George S. Henry Academy is a semestered public high school in Toronto, Ontario, Canada. It is operated by the Toronto District School Board.

== History ==
The initial opening of George S. Henry Secondary School was scheduled for September 7, 1965. However, there was a strike among workers. Some of the workers went back to work at the end of the summer, but it was not possible to open the school on time. During the fall, students had to share Don Mills Collegiate Institute and Victoria Park Collegiate Institute. Don Mills students attended from 8:00 am to 1:00 pm and Henry students went from 1:00 pm to 6:00 pm.

George S. Henry Secondary School was finally opened on December 6, 1965, with the official opening held on Thursday January 27, 1966. Guest speakers included Mr. John 'Jack' Foote, the principal at the time, as well as Mr. John Robarts, the Premier of Ontario.

An addition to the school was opened on February 16, 1972. This addition included the two floors of classes on the west side of the school as well as a new gymnasium and a pool.

The school was named after George Stewart Henry (1871–1958) – a farmer, businessman and politician in Ontario. He was first elected to the Legislative Assembly of Ontario in 1913 as a Conservative. The school was built on the Home Farm portion of the estate before housing development occurred, just east of Mr. Henry's "home". It was a Georgian "palace" complete with ornate gardens, statuary and fountains. Its nine-hole golf course was used by some of the early student body. The mansion alone remains as a social centre.

== Uniforms ==
George S. Henry Academy has a strict policy on uniforms which was instituted during the 1997–98 school year. Prior to that, the students were not required to wear uniforms and the student body voted in 1996 to bring the uniforms back. Students were required to wear a polo shirt, being short-sleeved or long-sleeved, that comes in black or white, or a sweater that comes in black or grey, both with the Henry crest on them. Recently, starting the year 2013, the school had been lenient on their uniform policy, allowing their students to wear any type of pants regardless of the colour. Starting in the 2022 school year, uniforms were no longer required.

== 50th-anniversary reunion ==
2015 marked the 50th anniversary of the school's opening. The reunion was to have taken place on Friday May 29 and Saturday May 30. All former students and teachers were invited.

== See also ==
- Education in Ontario
- List of secondary schools in Ontario
