= School of Experiential Education =

School of Experiential Education (SEE School)

Location
- 40 McArthur Street; Etobicoke, Toronto, Ontario, M9P 3M7; Canada; 43.701607°N 79.546611°W

Information
- School type: High school
- Founded: 1971
- School board: Toronto District School Board
- Superintendent: Andrea Alimi
- Area trustee: John Hastings
- Principal: Gabi Kurzydlowski
- Grades: 9 - 12
- Language: English
- Area: Islington Avenue and Dixon Road
- Website: seeiscool.blogspot.com

School of Experiential Education (SEE) is a small alternative high school located in Toronto's west end of Etobicoke. SEE's take on alternative education includes small class sizes, discussion-based courses, thematic English courses, and opportunities for independent and project-based learning. SEE delivers all courses required for the completion of the Ontario Secondary School Diploma. It offers opportunities to participate in media, technology, and photography courses, with equipment such as cameras, two computer labs, recording equipment and a dark room available for student use. SEE has a full curriculum that includes the arts, math, humanities and sciences, as well as physical education, technology and business. SEE is a semestered school.

It is designed for students with academic potential who are put off by the traditional high school approaches to learning. Almost all students go on to university.

The school opened originally as a small elementary school called Fairhaven Public School that opened in 1954. SEE school began in 1971 as one of two alternative schools in the Etobicoke School Board. When the government of Mike Harris merged the Toronto area school boards and sharply cut budgets in 1998, the school was threatened with closure.

== Admission process ==
Because SEE is an optional attendance school, potential students must go through an application process in order to be admitted. This process includes an application (including an essay), an interview, and submission of a transcript (if the student has previously attended a secondary school) or a report card (if the student is applying directly from grade eight).

== Notable alumni ==
- Dave Foley, actor/comedian (The Kids in the Hall) (did not graduate)

== See also ==
- Education in Ontario
- List of secondary schools in Ontario
