= Emery Collegiate Institute =

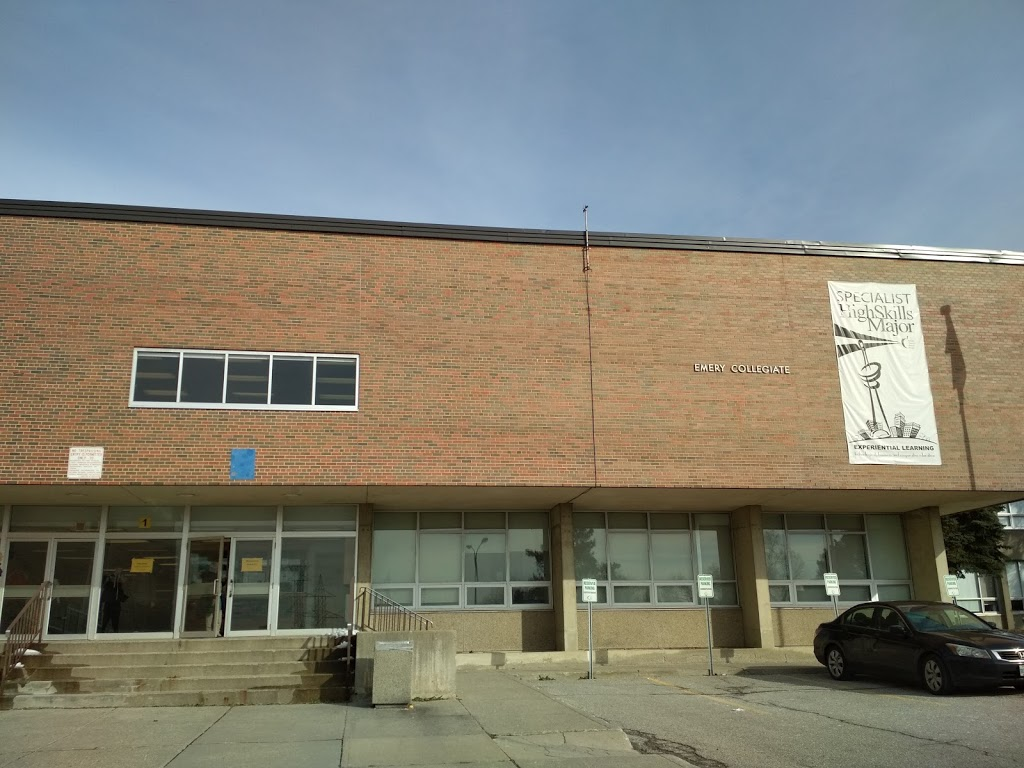

Location
- 3395 Weston Road; Toronto, Ontario, M9M 2V9; Canada; 43.7485°N 79.5386°W

Information
- Former name: Emery Senior High School; Emery Junior High School
- Type: Public high school
- Motto: Latin: Enisus Caelum Inveniat (One who strives may reach the sky!)
- Established: 1961
- School board: Toronto District School Board (North York Board of Education)
- Principal: Maria Palermo
- Grades: 9–12
- Schedule type: Semestered
- Colours: Red, White, Black
- Mascot: Eagle
- Team name: Emery Eagles
- Website: schoolweb.tdsb.on.ca/emeryci

Emery Collegiate Institute is a public semestered and adult high school in Toronto, Ontario, Canada, part of the Toronto District School Board. Prior to 1998, it was part of the North York Board of Education

== History ==
The school is named for the nearby neighbourhood of Emery. It was built in 1960 and opened in September 1961, to serve a then-new suburban housing development. In the main hallway, the school has a visible display of its original bell from when it was first built. Charlie Brown served as the first principal in the school, alongside Allen S. Merritt, who served as the first Vice-Principal. The building was designed by architects James Murray & Henry Fliess.

Emery Junior High School operated in this building until 1985 when the school merged with G. B. Warren Junior High School (formerly Humbermede Junior High School) to form Humber Summit Middle School. The Collegiate has solely since operated grades 9-12 only with an adult program attached.

In 2000, Toronto Police arrested 4 people in relation to a shooting that happened in the school parking-lot, which injured 3. One of the 4 arrested was charged with criminal negligence causing bodily harm, attempted murder, and discharging a firearm. In 2007, the school was investigated by the Toronto District School Board for possible gang-related activity.

In 2009, students from the school came third among 875 others, in a NASA-organized science competition. In 2014, students representing the school came in first place at the Art of Physics Competition organized by the Canadian Association of Physicists.

In 2015, the school was included in a list of schools that may possibly get shut-down (due to various reasons, such as underpopulation, age, et cetera) by the government.

In 2017, the school was listed among the bottom 20 (worst-rated) schools in Ontario, by the Fraser Institute. Receiving an FI Rating of 1.5/10, the school ranked 730th out of 747 schools.

In 2013, the school was shut down temporarily due to flooding in the hallways.

== Clubs ==
There are many student-organized clubs within the school, including, but not limited to the Business Club, Student Council, Athletic Council, Art Club, Environmental Club, Chess Club, Board-games Club, H.E.R.O. (Helping to Educate Regarding Orientation), and Africana.

== Competitive teams ==
Emery Collegiate Institute has competitive teams for Basketball, Soccer, Wrestling, Water Polo, Running, and Robotics.

== Population ==
As of December 31, 2017, there are 259 girls and 358 boys in the school, and 50% or more of the school population speaks a primary language other than English. 29.4% of the student body is defined as ESL under provincial regulations. 30.6% of the student population is also defined as Special Needs. 66.4% of student test scores are below the provincial education standard.

== Notable alumni ==
- Jerry Tonello, Canadian wheelchair basketball coach
- Lou Pomanti, musician
- Alfie Zappacosta, instrumentalist, Juno Award winner
- Claudio Vena, composer, instrumentalist
- Jason Allison, professional hockey player, former team captain of Boston Bruins
- Laurence Hutchman, writer, poet, Doctor of Philosophy, and professor
- Carol McCartney, musician, former Miss Toronto
- Harry Pfluegl, professional hockey player
- Paul Higgins, professional hockey player
- Donovan "Razor" Ruddock, former professional heavyweight boxer

== See also ==
- Education in Ontario
- List of secondary schools in Ontario
