= Subway Academy II =

Coordinates: 43°39′20.9″N 79°23′44.6″W

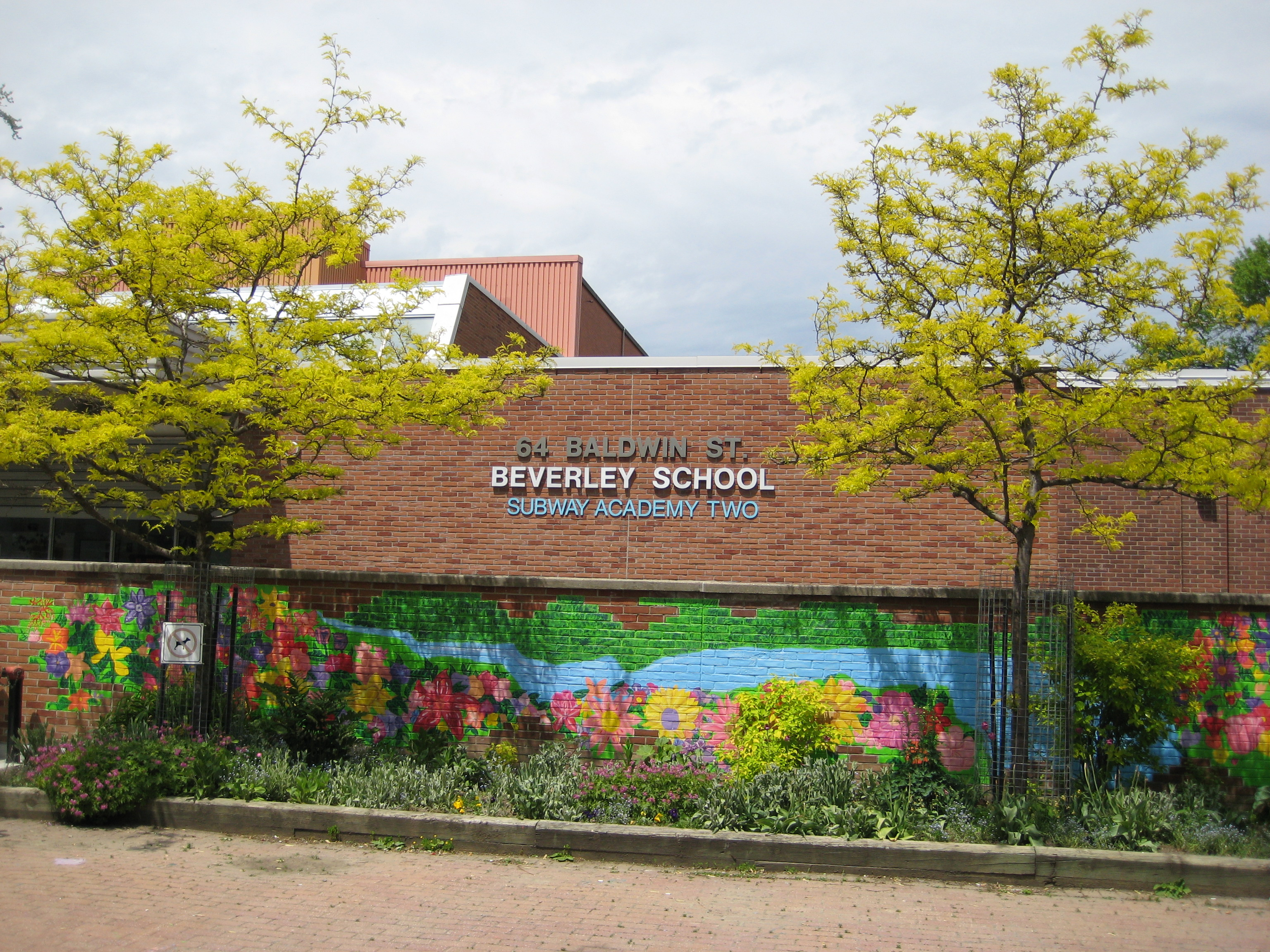

Location
- 64 Baldwin Street; Toronto, Ontario, M5T 1L4; Canada

Information
- School type: High school
- Motto: We must act as if our institutions are ours to create, our learning is ours to define, our leadership we seek is ours to become.
- Founded: 1976
- School board: Toronto District School Board
- Superintendent: Uton Robinson
- Area trustee: Chris Moise
- Principal: Rizwana Jafri
- Grades: 10-12
- Enrolment: 96
- Language: English
- Schedule type: Semestered

Subway Academy II is a public alternative high school in downtown Toronto, Ontario, Canada. It is located on the third floor of Beverley Public School, an elementary school for disabled children. Subway II (as it is referred to by many students) offers an unconventional approach to schooling, with a more flexible schedule, and one-on-one sessions with teachers. The school received its name from Subway Academy I, as it was an offshoot of that school. Despite the name, it is not accessible by the subway, and most students take the 510 Spadina streetcar to get to school. Nearby landmarks include Kensington Market, the University of Toronto, and the Art Gallery of Ontario.

== Classes ==
Students are only required to come to class three days a week, but they are free to come on the other days as well.

The learning environment at the school includes six computers, a collaborative chalkboard, a VCR/DVD player, a fully equipped kitchen, and a sizeable lending library. Due to its modest size and lack of a science lab or gym, Subway II has a limited range of course options. Although many traditional high schools are unable to offer them, Subway does offer a variety of more advanced philosophy, sociology, and law classes, as well as practical ones like parenting and nutrition.

== Student body ==
Despite its relatively small student body, Subway II's has a diverse and varied student base. Males make up 28% of the student body, while females make up 66.26%. For 27% of people, English is not their primary language.

Subway II has relatively few extracurricular activities. Subway attempts to address this with guest speakers and field trips, both of which are typically open to anyone wishing to attend.

Subway II currently has four teachers, for a teacher-to-student ratio of 1:20..

== Notable alumni ==
- Will Arnett, actor
- Alice Glass, singer
- Sarah Polley, actress
- Liam Titcomb, musician and actor
- Caterina Scorsone, actress

== See also ==
- Education in Ontario
- List of secondary schools in Ontario
