= Downsview Secondary School =

Location
- 7 Hawksdale Road; Toronto, Ontario, M3K 1W3; Canada; 43.7309°N 79.4792°W

Information
- Former name: Downsview Collegiate Institute
- School type: Public, high school
- Motto: Knowledge is Power!
- Founded: 1955
- School board: Toronto District School Board
- Superintendent: Linda Curtis
- Area trustee: Alexandra Lulka
- Principal: Saraya Elwin
- Grades: 9-12
- Enrollment: 540 (2024-2025)
- Language: English
- Schedule type: Semestered
- Mascot: Mustangs
- Team name: Downsview Mustangs
- Website: schoolweb.tdsb.on.ca/downsview

Downsview Secondary School, formerly known as Downsview Collegiate Institute, is a semestered public secondary school in Toronto, Ontario, Canada.

== Africentric Program ==
In 2013, TDSB proposed Downsview Secondary as the second school in the city to offer Africentric program.

== See also ==
- Education in Ontario
- List of secondary schools in Ontario
