= Victoria Park Collegiate Institute =

Coordinates: 43.755768°N 79.321445°W

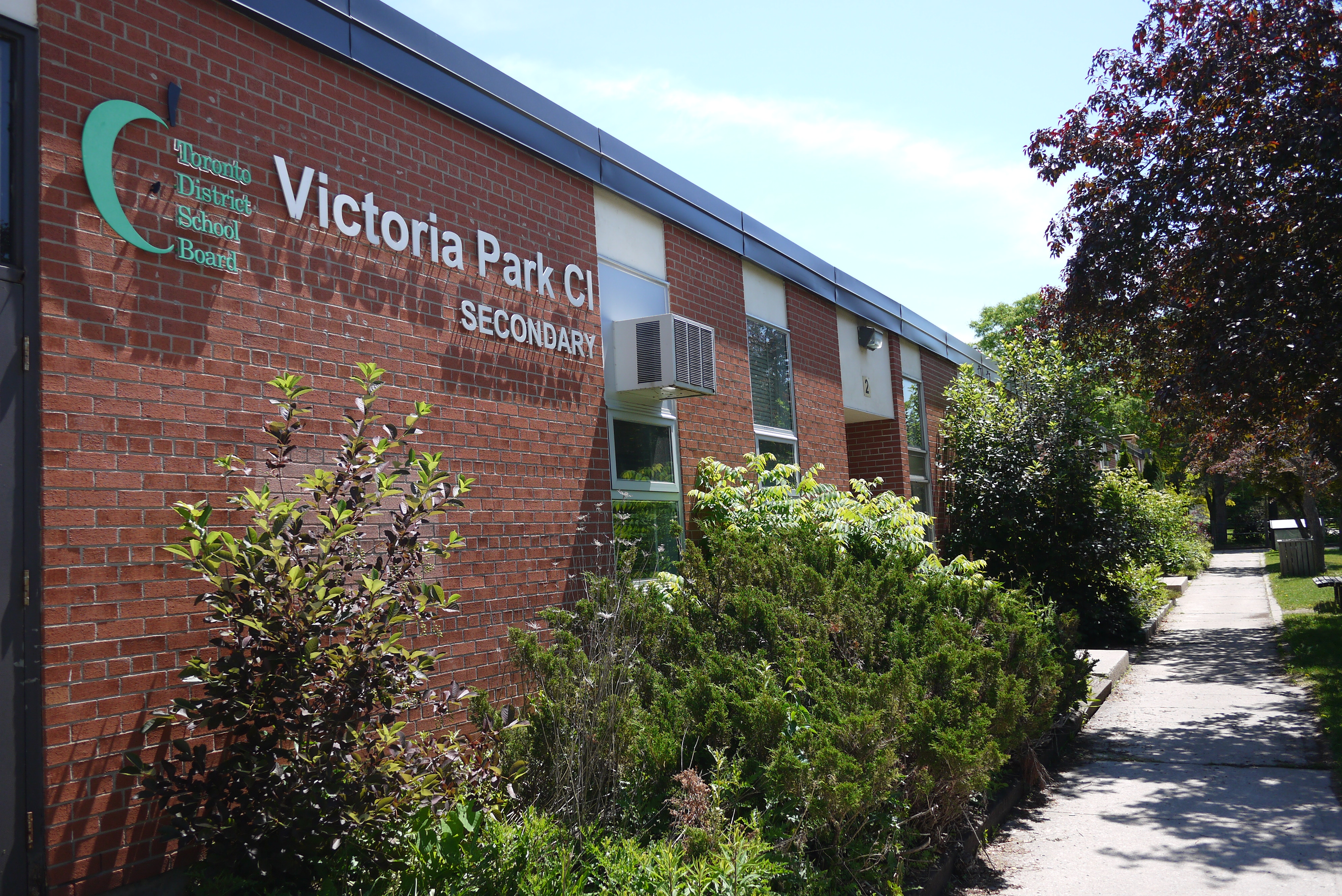

Location
- 15 Wallingford Road; Toronto, Ontario, M3A 2V1; Canada

Information
- School type: Public High school
- Motto: Perge et Perage "Take Action and Pursue our Goals with Enthusiasm"
- Established: 1960
- School board: Toronto District School Board
- Superintendent: Nadira Persaud
- Area trustee: Farzana Rajwani
- Principal: Rick Tarasuk
- Grades: 9-12
- Enrolment: 1,174 (as of August 2021)
- Language: English
- Schedule type: Semestered
- Area: North York, Ontario
- Colours: Scarlet and Gold
- Mascot: Panther
- Website: https://schoolweb.tdsb.on.ca/victoriapark/
- Last updated: April 23, 2025

Victoria Park Collegiate Institute (commonly known as Victoria Park C.I., Victoria Park, Vic Park, VP, and VPCI); formerly Victoria Park Secondary School, is a collegiate institute in Toronto, Ontario, Canada. It is located south of York Mills Road and west of Victoria Park Ave. in the district of North York. It is the first publicly funded school in Ontario to host the International Baccalaureate Diploma Programme. Authorized to offer the IB Diploma Programme since July 1987, the programme is taught in English. The school is open to male and female students. Some feeder schools include Milne Valley Middle School and Donview Middle School. The student population of Victoria Park Collegiate Institute is diverse, with a component of English as Second Language students (over 30%).

== History ==
Victoria Park Collegiate Institute was officially opened to students in 1960. Its name derives from the nearby Victoria Park Avenue.

Approximately two decades after its founding, Victoria Park C.I. became the first public school within Ontario to offer the International Baccalaureate Program.

In the late 2000s, a fitness centre was opened, the Brian Maxwell Fitness Centre.

Between 2016 and 2018, renovations were made to the school, which included remodelling the gym, improving the track field, revamping parking lots. New additions included a resource room, cell phone charging station, and repainted walls and doors.

On November 13, 2020, an 11-year boy died after falling through a skylight in the school

On November 16, 2021, three students were stabbed, one fatally, during a fight outside the school. The suspect was arrested and later acquitted in 2024

On May 12, 2022, the school was placed in a lockdown after a grade 11 student was non-fatally shot in the south parking lot of the school

== Academical achievements ==
=== Provincial assessment ===
For the year 2023/2024,

- Grade 9 EQAO Mathematics assessment: 59% of all students were at or above the provincial standard (level 3 and above), compared with 56% for the Toronto District School Board.
- Grade 10 Ontario Secondary School Literacy Test: 84% of first-time eligible students who participated fully successfully passed the assessment, compared with 84% for the Toronto District School Board.

== International Baccalaureate program ==
Victoria Park C.I. was the first public school in Ontario to offer the International Baccalaureate Diploma Program, beginning in 1987. Grade nine and ten students are admitted into a pre-IB program at Victoria Park where they are given the opportunity to gauge the IB curriculum. Individuals who wish to apply for the pre-IB program must complete a test to show their academic level. The test includes math, French, and English. IB graduates from Victoria Park C.I. consistently score in the top 10% worldwide, with many individuals in the top 5%. In the graduating class of 2013, 16 students out of 94 achieved a total score of 40 points or above, including one student who scored 44 points.

== Sports and Teams ==
Sports offered at Victoria Park C.I. include:

- Baseball

- The Varsity Boys' Baseball offered again in the 2006-2007 school year

- Volleyball
- Soccer
- Archery

- The archery team was started in 2002 and has won a medal every year since 2003.

- Tennis
- Ultimate Frisbee
- Badminton
- Rugby

- Resumed in the fall of 2010 after a 15-year hiatus

- Basketball
- Track and Field
- Water Polo

- The Varsity Girls' Water Polo team was the TDSB North Region champion in 2015 and 2016

- Cricket
- Cross Country
- Co-ed Swim

== Clubs ==
Clubs offered include:

- Dance Crew
- Announcements
- HOSA
- Middle Eastern North African Association (MENAA)
- Muslim Student Association (MSA)
- Tamil Student Association (TSA)
- Eco Council
- Mandarin Club
- Math Club
- She Empowers
- French Club
- Gardening Club
- Target Alpha
- Ditsy
- Protein Club
- Stage Crew
- Rubik's Cubing Club
- MedLife
- Future Business Leaders of America (FBLA)
- Knitting Club
- Model UN
- Science Olympics
- Pride VP
- Coding Club
- DECA
- Debate Club
- Literature Club
- VP Ambassadors
- OXFAM
- Prom Committee
- Yearbook
- Victoria Park Athletic Council (VPAC)
- Visual Arts Council (VAC)
- Student Leadership Council (SLC)
- Mental Health Awareness Council (MHAC)
- Music Council
- Jazz Band
- Strings Orchestra
- Choir
- Concert Band
- Guitar Ensemble
- Jetfac
  - A drama club that produces yearly performances and musicals, named after the drama room

Competitive clubs include:

- Chess

- The Senior chess team placed first at the city championships and 2nd overall at the provincial championships in 2009-2010.
- In 2018, the Senior chess team took first place again in the Toronto Secondary School Chess League (TSSCL) Team Championships. The junior team tied for first, but placed second on tiebreak.

- Robotics

- The robotics club has mainly two subdivisions, one for VEX Robotics Competition, and another one for FIRST Robotics Competition.
- The FIRST team has won several awards since the year of 2014.

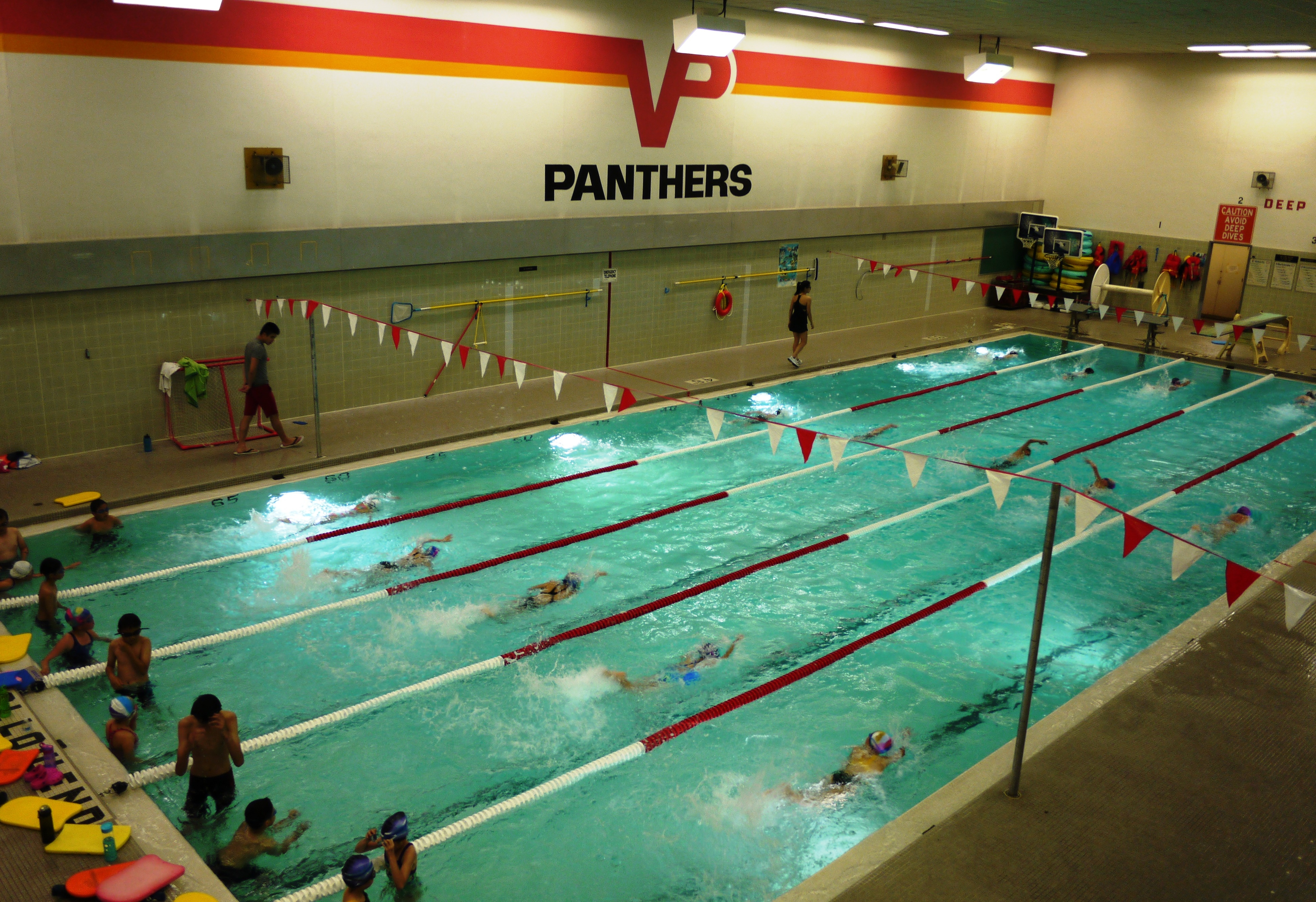
The school premises include a swimming pool, which is available for use by local swimming clubs in the neighbourhood.

== Library ==
Victoria Park Collegiate Institute's library

Victoria Park C.I., like all high schools in the TDSB, has a resourceful library. The library offers over 20 workstations, two computer labs, independent study areas, printing services, and photocopying service. The library is also the home to over a thousand books of all genres. The library occasionally holds fundraisers for the Hospital for Sick Children and much more.

Some programs on the hundreds of computers (which run on Windows 7 and Windows 10) are Turing programming software, Microsoft Office 2010, and graphic editors such as Adobe Photoshop. The Accelerated Reader software is offered, with which grade nine students are encouraged to read and are tested afterwards on the content of the novel they chose. Victoria Park CI has many carts of laptops which run on Windows 7 as well.

=== White Pine at VP ===
The White Pine high school reading program started in Victoria Park C.I. in the spring of 2003. Every year at the beginning of semester two, a meeting is held in the school library to gather students who are interested in participating in this reading program. All books nominated for White Pine are young adult fictions written by Canadian authors. The ten nominated books are introduced to the students who will have to read at least seven out of the ten selections to be eligible to vote for their favourite book.

A meeting takes place every three weeks in the library where students get an opportunity to discuss, with their peers as well as other teachers, about the books they have read. The voting for the favourite book takes place in mid-May at the school. After all the votes from across Ontario have been accounted for, teachers and students of Victoria Park C.I who have participated in the White Pine reading program are then invited to the ceremony where the winning author of the nominated books is announced.

== Notable alumni ==
=== Students ===
- Katharine Birbalsingh, headteacher, educational influencer
- Brian Maxwell, athlete, founder of PowerBar
- Pierre Browne, sprinter
- Bruce Boudreau, Coach of the Vancouver Canucks
- Paul Quarrington, author and musician
- Dan Hill, singer and songwriter
- Michael Coteau, Ontario MPP and Minister for Citizenship and Immigration
- Yuanling Yuan, Canadian WIM Chess Master and founder of Chess in the Library.
- Jowi Taylor, CBC Radio Broadcaster, and Founder of the Six String Nation project

=== Staff ===
- Yuri Shymko, politician

== See also ==
- Education in Ontario
- List of secondary schools in Ontario
