= Ontario Secondary School Diploma =

Secondary school diploma

The Ontario Secondary School Diploma (OSSD) is a diploma granted to secondary school graduates in the Canadian province of Ontario. It is part of the publicly funded province-wide school system. It is awarded to all students who complete the Ontario education curriculum, including students in Special Education, the TOPS program, MaCS program, IB Program, and other focused secondary school programs.

Adults who did not complete an Ontario Secondary School Diploma may take the Canadian Adult Education Credential battery of high school equivalency tests to receive an Ontario High School Equivalency Certificate.

== Diploma requirements ==
The academic credit system applies to students from Grades 9 through 12. To obtain an Ontario Secondary School Diploma, one must earn the following compulsory credits:

- 4 credits in one's first language (English or French) (from Grade 9 - 12, one credit per year),
- 3 credits in Mathematics, with at least one credit in Grade 11 or 12,
- 2 credits in Science, one in Grade 9 and one in Grade 10,
- 1 credit in Grade 10 Canadian History,
- 1 credit in Grade 9 Canadian Geography,
- 1 credit in the arts,
- 1 credit in Health and physical education,
- 1 credit in one's second language, either French or English,
- 1 credit in technological education in Grade 9 or Grade 10
- 0.5 credits in Grade 10 Career Studies
- 0.5 credits in Grade 10 Civics

=== Additional provincial requirements ===
One must also earn 1 credit in the STEM-related course group:

1 credit in either:

- Business Studies
- Computer Studies
- Cooperative Education
- Mathematics (in addition to the 3 compulsory credits)
- Science (in addition to the 2 compulsory credits)
- Technological Education (in addition to the 1 compulsory credit)

In addition, students must also have completed:

- 13 optional credits (4 of which may be obtained through approved dual-credit courses and coop),
- 40 hours of community service,
- meet the provincial secondary school literacy requirement,
- meet the provincial secondary school financial literacy requirement,
- 2 eLearning courses. (students may opt-out of this requirement with parental approval and signature)

Note that a student can receive their community service from the start of Grade 9 (including the summer between Grade 8 and 9) until the April of Grade 12, with summer break and weekends included.

The provincial secondary school literacy requirement can be met through passing the Ontario Secondary School Literacy Test with a score of 75.0% or above. If one fails the Literacy Test, they must rewrite the test the following school year, or complete the Ontario Secondary School Literacy Course (OLC 3O or 4O) in grade 11 or 12.

The provincial secondary school financial literacy requirement can be met through passing the relevant modules of the Grade 10 Career Studies course with a score of 75.0% or above. A student has two attempts to pass the modules.

In Grade 9 and 10 (years 1 and 2, respectively), a student must complete 16 credits in total, 8 each year. In Grade 11 and 12 (Year 3 and 4, respectively), one must complete the 14 remaining credits, with no less than 6 attempted credits each year in accordance with compulsory education law. In total, 30 credits must be achieved. One can stay in high school until all 30 credits are achieved, or to obtain any additional or required credits for post-secondary admission.

== Ontario Secondary School Certificate ==
The Ontario Secondary School Certificate may be requested by students who leave school before earning their OSSD if they have earned a minimum of 14 credits distributed over the following courses:

- 2 credits in English
- 1 credit in Canadian history or geography
- 1 credit in mathematics
- 1 credit in science
- 1 credit in health and physical education
- 1 credit in the arts, technological education, or computer studies
- 7 additional electives

== See also ==
- What do you need to graduate? ISBN 1-4249-0089-1
- List of high schools in Ontario
