= Nanjing No.13 Middle School =

Nanjing No.13 Middle School 南京市第十三中学

Location
- Nanjing, Jiangsu; China
- Coordinates: 32.06328°N 118.79206°E

Information
- Type: Public
- Motto: 志远行近 (Achieve the goal with solid effort)
- Established: 1955; 70 years ago
- Principal: Mr. Tu Guifang
- Staff: 182
- Website: www.nj13z.cn (in Chinese)

Nanjing No.13 Middle School (Chinese: 南京市第十三中学; pinyin: Nánjīng Shì Dìshísān Zhōngxué) is a senior high school located in Xuanwu District, Nanjing, Jiangsu Province, China, near the city government. It is a Four-Star key high school of Jiangsu Province.

== History ==
Nanjing No.13 Middle School was founded in 1955, under administration of the city government. It composed of both junior and senior middle school. Several years after its establishment, the school was selected as one of the six key schools in Nanjing and designated as a provincial key school (省重点高中) by the Jiangsu Education Department. In 2004, the school was entitled a provincial Four-Star school (省四星级高中). Now Nanjing No.13 Middle School has set up an education group, consisting of three senior and four junior middle schools.

== Education Group ==
Nanjing No.13 Middle School is part of "Nanjing No.13 High School Education Group" (南京十三中教育集团). The Group consists of both senior high schools and secondary schools, with a faculty and student enrollment of over 10,000.

Senior High School:

- Nanjing No.13 Middle School (南京市第十三中学)
- Bond International School (邦德国际学校)
- Xuanwu Senior High School (玄武高级中学)

Secondary School:

- Ke Lihua Middle School (科利华中学)
- Nanjing No.13 Middle School Hongshan Campus (南京十三中红山分校)
- Nanjing No.13 Middle School Suojin Campus (南京十三中锁金分校)
- Zidong Experimental School (紫东实验学校)

== Partnership with Canadian school ==
Bond International College has partnered with Nanjing No.13 Middle School since 2005 to provide a dual Canadian-Chinese high school diploma program, facilitating graduates from Nanjing No.13 Middle School to continue their educations at Canadian universities.
