= David and Mary Thomson Collegiate Institute =

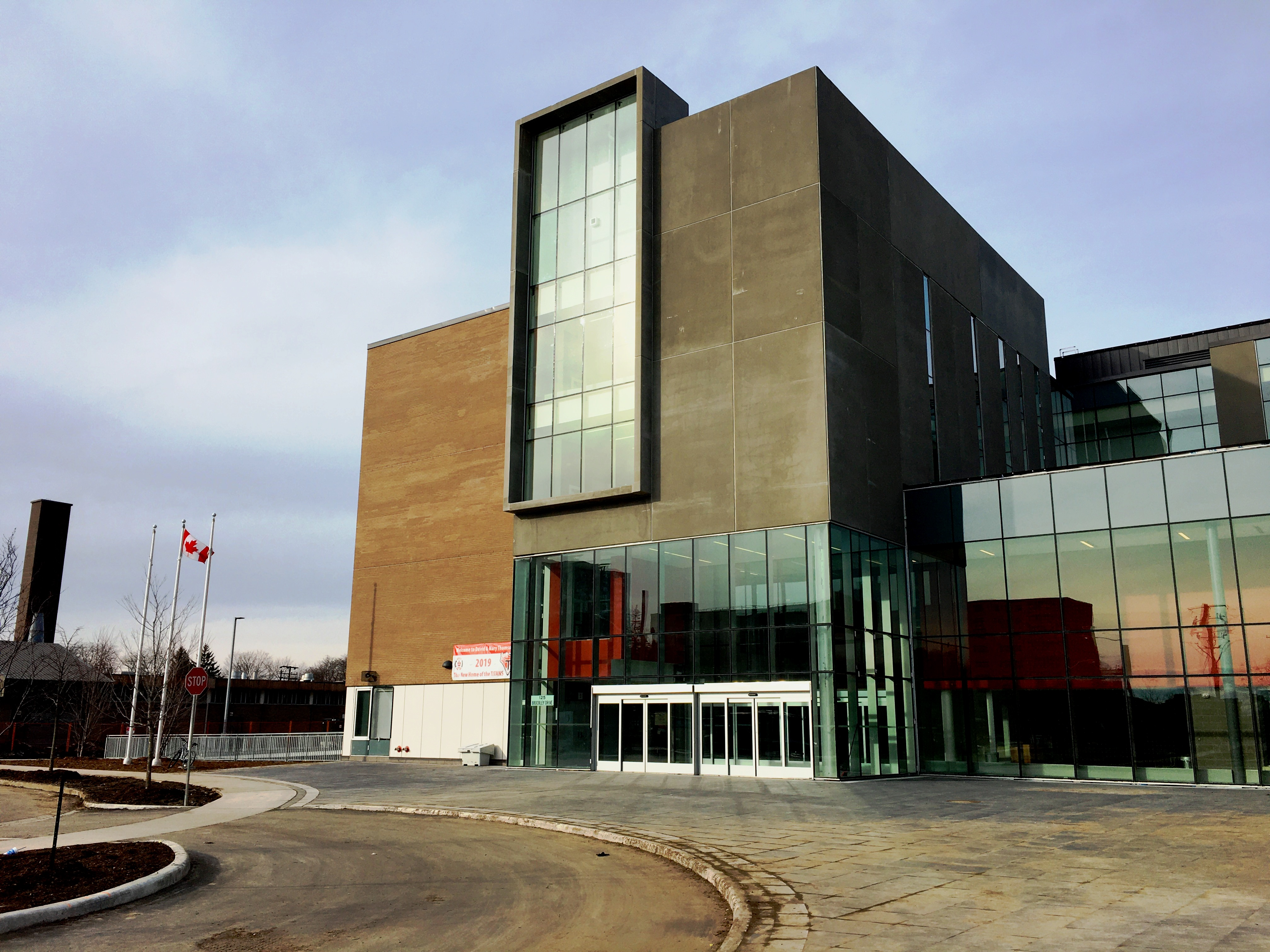
- The new David and Mary Thomson C.I. school building on Brockley Drive, built on the former Bendale B.T.I. playing field.

Location
- 125 Brockley Drive; Toronto, Ontario, M1P 0E1; Canada; 43°45′12″N 79°15′47″W

Information
- School type: Public, High school
- Motto: Nil Sine Magno Labore (Nothing without great effort)
- Founded: September 8, 1959; 67 years ago, 2740 Lawrence Avenue East
- Status: Active, original building demolished
- School board: Toronto District School Board (Scarborough Board of Education)
- Oversight: Toronto Lands Corporation
- Superintendent: Kurt McIntosh; LC3, Executive; Lynn Strangway; LN13
- Area trustee: David Smith; Ward 17
- School number: 4130 / 903590
- Principal: Aatif Choudhry
- Grades: 9–12
- Enrolment: 997 (2018–2019)
- Language: English
- Campus size: 12.3 acres
- Colours: Red and Black
- Mascot: Titan
- Team name: Thomson Pioneers (1959–1962); Thomson Redmen (1959–2005); Thomson Titans (2005–present)
- Feeder schools: Charles Gordon Senior Public School; Donwood Park Public School; Edgewood Public School; John McCrae Public School; Knob Hill Public School; Robert Service Sr. Public School; St. Andrew's Public School
- Website: www.thomsoncollegiate.com
- Last updated: August 21, 2019

David and Mary Thomson Collegiate Institute (sometimes called David and Mary Thomson, DMT, DMTCI, Thomson CI or Thomson) is a semestered English-language high school in Toronto, Ontario, Canada. Located in the Bendale neighbourhood of the district of Scarborough. It was originally sanctioned by the Scarborough Board of Education and since 1998 under its successor board, the Toronto District School Board.

From 1959–60 until the 2018–19 school year, Thomson was housed in the Lawrence Avenue East building constructed in 1958 and the new school building was built in the former Bendale Business and Technical Institute property in 2019. The school was named after David and Mary Thomson, the first European settlers who immigrated to Scarborough in the late 18th century. Its motto is Nil Sine Magno Labore ("Nothing worthwhile is accomplished without hard work").

== History ==
=== Original school (1959–2019) ===
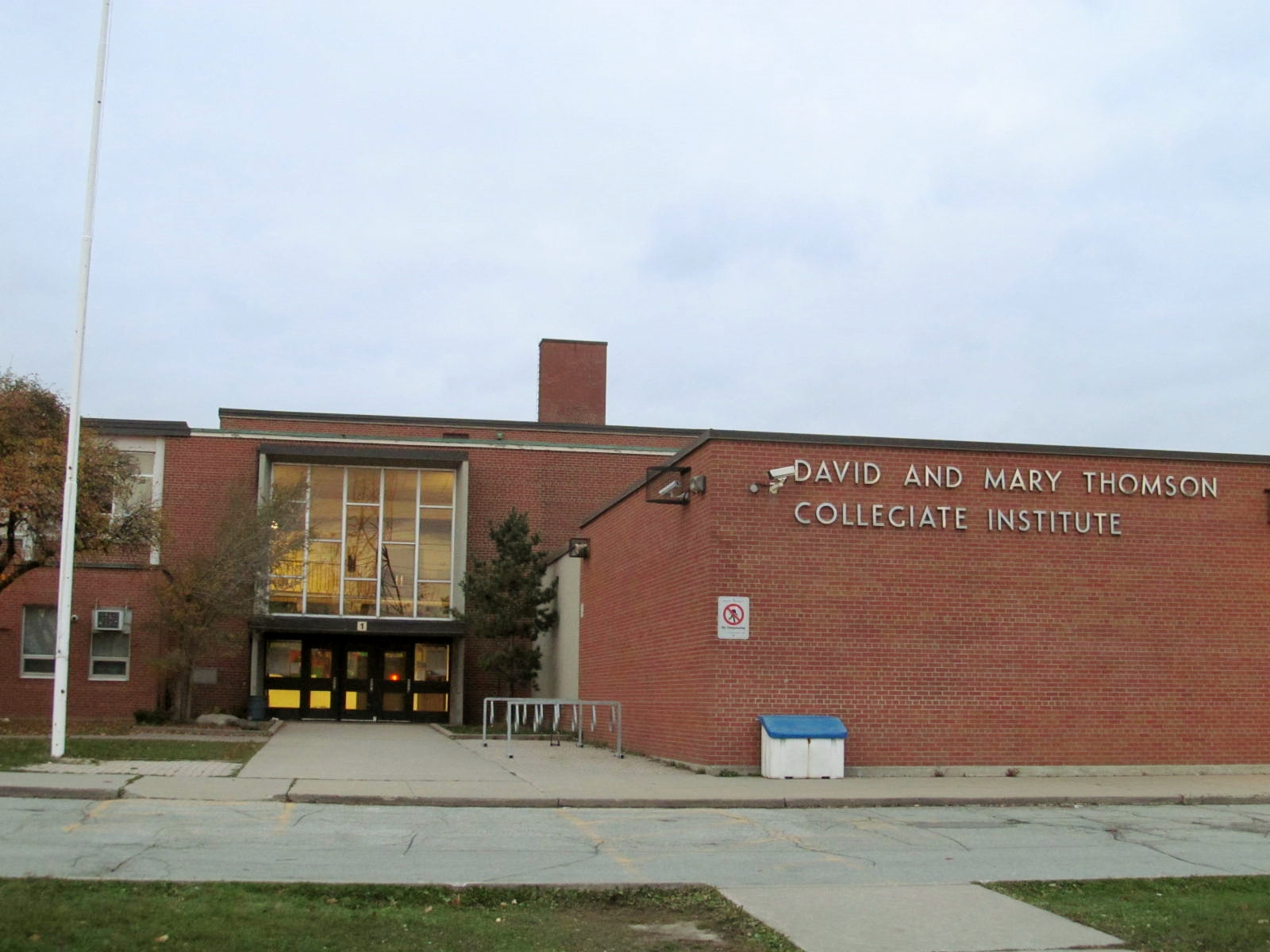
The original David and Mary Thomson C.I. building on 2740 Lawrence Avenue East, built in 1958.

On July 14, 1953, the Scarborough Township Public School Board Area No. 2 (the forerunner of the Scarborough Board of Education and later the Toronto District School Board) acquired 8.6 acres of land on Lawrence Avenue East west of Brimley Road for the future secondary school known as David and Mary Thomson Collegiate Institute splitting off the population of Winston Churchill Collegiate Institute and R. H. King Collegiate Institute and expanded later to six acres. The property the STPSB No. 2 had acquired was the land donated by Scarborough's first European settlers from Scotland, David and Mary Thomson, whose descendants lived in Scarborough for generations.

The school building was built in 1958 on the land farmed by the Thomson family and opened on September 8, 1959. The building was designed by the architects Peter L. Allward and George Roper Gouinlock and featured 23 standard classrooms, 1 art room, 2 music rooms, 5 science labs, library, 2 industrial arts, 2 home economics, 2 typing rooms, auditorium, double gymnasium, and cafeteria.

It opened as the sixth secondary school in the borough. W. A. Porter Collegiate Institute, the fifth, had opened the year before. The school's founding principal was J. Ross Stevenson who led a staff of 69 within the teaching, clerical, janitorial and cafeteria positions. These two years marked the beginning of a rapid growth period in the Scarborough school system necessitated by equally rapid growth in business and industry and in population. Thomson officially opened on February 17, 1960.

The school underwent additions in the 1960s and 1970s including extra classrooms, new gymnasia for girls and boys, science labs, an enlarged library, and vocational shops. In 1989, following the loss of Tabor Park Vocational School to the Metropolitan Separate School Board, Thomson became as a third campus for Scarborough Centre for Alternative Studies; the latter moved to Centennial College in 1994. After the closure of Midland Avenue Collegiate Institute in June 2000; students in its former catchment area are now served by Thomson.

The capacity of the original facility is 1,623 pupils. As of the 2018–2019 year, the number enrolled is 997.

Thomson C.I. celebrated its 50th anniversary in 2009 and 60th anniversary in 2019 to commemorate the closure of the original school building.

=== Move to Brockley Drive (2019–present) ===
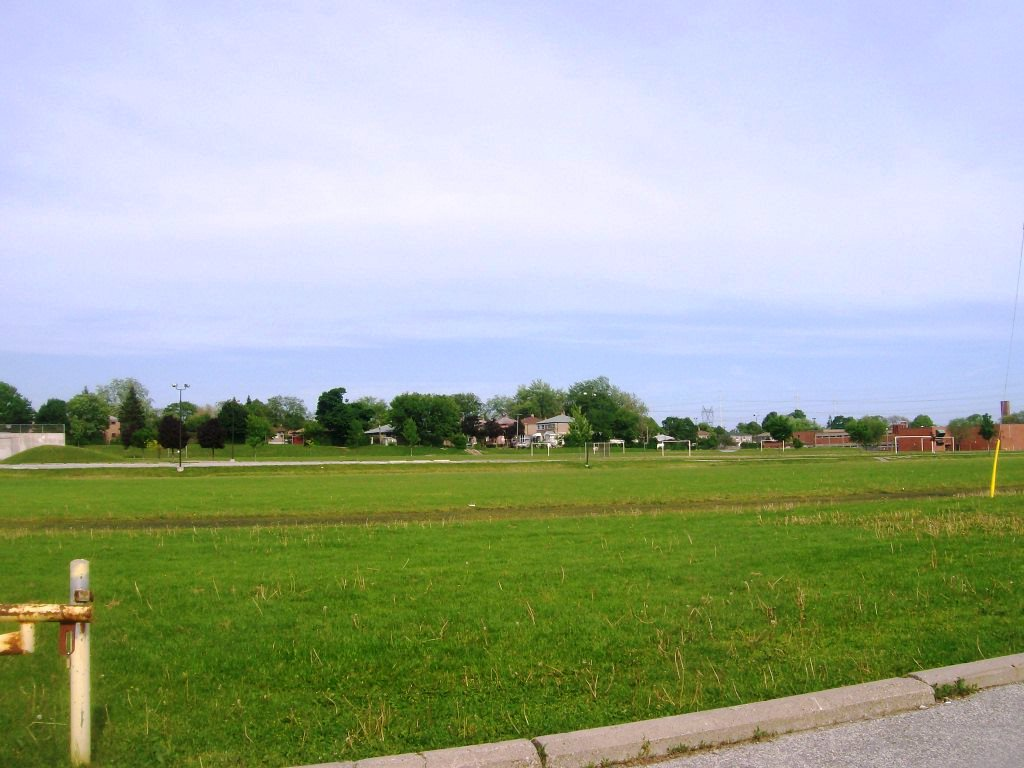
A new "superschool" is to be built behind Bendale Business and Technical Institute, rendering the Thomson site surplus.

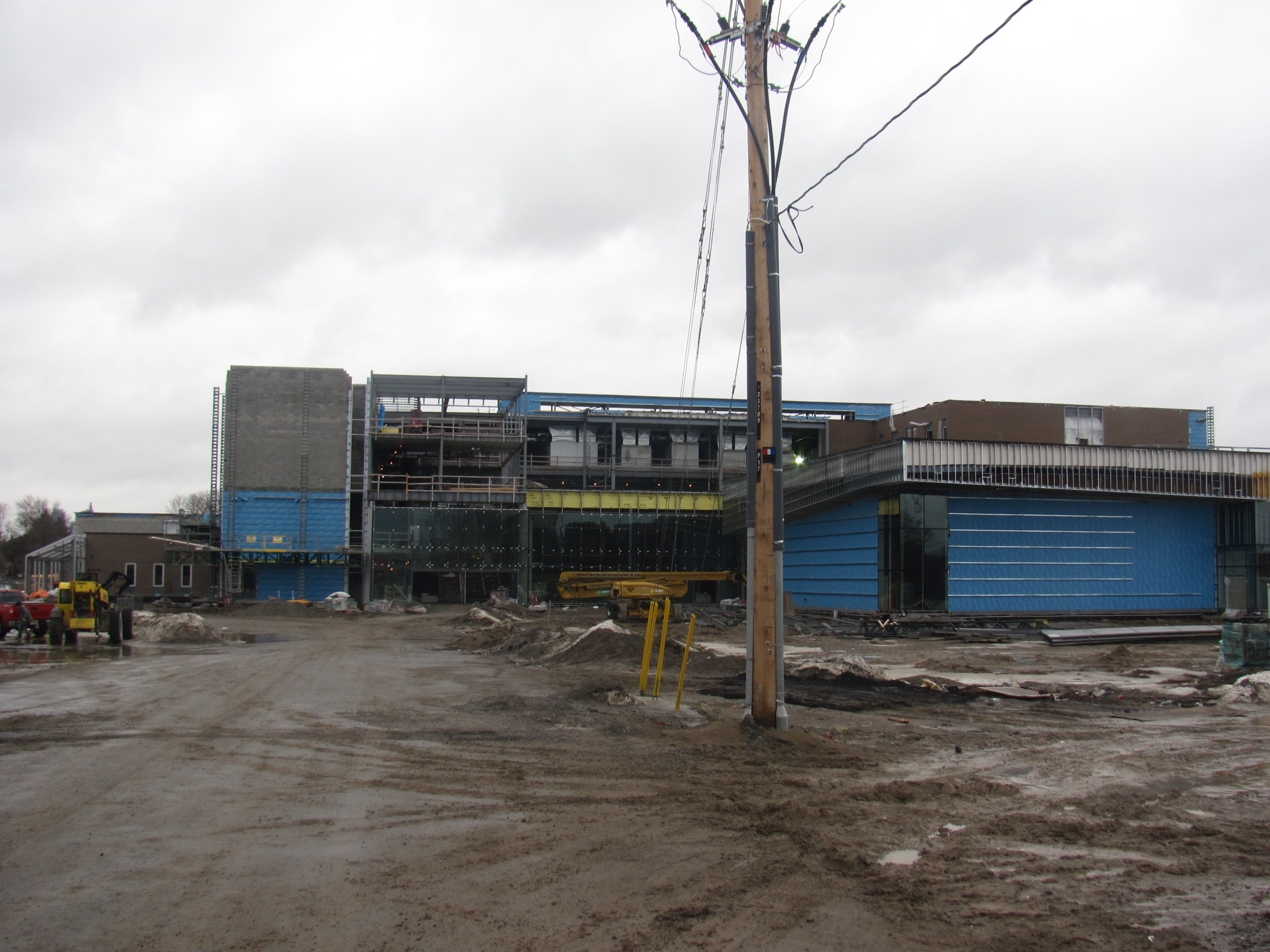
The new Thomson C.I. building, under construction.

On February 4, 2009, The Toronto District School Board approved a plan to merge David and Mary Thomson with the neighbouring Bendale Business and Technical Institute to form a modern "superschool".

In June 2012 the Toronto Lands Corporation declared the Thomson site (12.3 acres) and building surplus. The land on which Thomson is located was donated by the family of David and Mary Thomson and there are no plans to protect and designate the site under the Ontario Heritage Act. Various boards and public bodies expressed an interest in buying the property, including the Toronto Catholic District School Board, Conseil Scolaire Viamonde and Conseil scolaire de district catholique Centre-Sud. In early 2013, Viamonde offered to purchase the property for future use as a high school, but then withdrew the offer because they had not received ministerial approval.

Both the Thomson and the Bendale sites are now slated to be used for housing, but this proposal has aroused local opposition, particularly over the loss of green space and over residents' impressions that they were told the Thomson site would be used for a school and that they were initially promised an urban farm. Per regulation 444/98, other public agencies should be given the right to make an offer before the property is placed on the open market. Midland Park Community Association, a residents' group in Scarborough, and the Greater Bendale Advocacy Team (GBAT), formed by Mark Weiser, protested the TDSB's plans for townhouses on the Thomson site, resulting in a decision by Scarborough Community Council to place a hold on any further sale or development on either school site pending community consultation. The TDSB appealed to the Ontario Municipal Board. At a protest rally organised by GBAT in February 2015, more than 160 signs were distributed. In May 2015 the local councillor, Michael Thompson, announced that an agreement had been reached with the school district to reserve almost 3 acres of the site for community uses, including a daycare centre that is to be part of the new school; many felt this was insufficient. The city approved the purchase of 2 acres of the site under this plan.

In April 2017, construction of the new school began on the racetrack and sports field of Bendale BTI. The new school, under its project name, Lawrence Midland Secondary School, is designed in conjunction with the architectural firms of ZAS Architects and Taylor+Smith.

The new school was originally expected to be scheduled to open in September 2019 on Brockley Drive. Due to delays regarding construction issues ranging from weather to workers strike, the merged Thomson-Bendale student body operated from the existing Lawrence building until construction was completed. Thomson's new building officially opened on December 10, 2019 and features a four-storey modern building, cafetorium, two double gymnasiums and school-wide WiFi. As of August 2020, the former Lawrence building is undergoing demolition.

== Logo ==
Reginald H. King, head of the Scarborough Board of Education when Thomson opened, was a classicist. The motto Nil sine magno labore (Nothing without great effort) – which is also used by Brooklyn College in Brooklyn, New York – was selected as most appropriate from his collection of Latin mottos and was incorporated in the Thomson logo, which remains unchanged. The motto appears at the base of a scarlet maple leaf on which are superimposed a lamp of learning and the initials D and M in white. The leaf is flanked by a large "C" and "I", both in black forming arcs of a circle with the lower sections of the motto. Finally the name "Thomson", white on a scarlet background, surmounts the rest of the design and completes the circle. The school colours were originally scarlet, black and white.

== Campus ==
David and Mary Thomson Collegiate Institute is a four-storey composite high school on 12 acres of land. The new school contains 48 conventional academic classrooms, seven science labs, five computer labs, two music rooms, one theatre arts room that can be used as a lecture hall, two gymnasia that can be partitioned into two smaller gyms, main and guidance offices, a library, a centralized cafetorium with a stage, six special education classes, four vocational shops and labs for woodworking, culinary, green industries and hairstyling and six staff workrooms.

The school's new layout is radically different from the previous school as the facade in the front is mostly glass while the remainder were built with brown bricks. The first and second floors are art, technical, and science wings while the third and fourth are mostly an academic wing. The new lockers have a new design and are coloured blue with a white trim. It has six staircases and 12 fire exits.

In the old Lawrence building, the campus was built in a modern two-storey building consisted of 52 academic classrooms with department offices for English, Math, Social Sciences and Canadian/World Studies, nine science labs, two drafting rooms, two large gymnasia (one front and one back) that can be partitioned into four gyms with each training rooms in the upper area that no school has, two music rooms, a drama room, two art rooms, a sewing room, a home economics, 500-seat auditorium in the upper and lower sections with a stage, a cafeteria complex with servery, large atrium, two courtyards, a student council room, faculty lounge, a larger but expanded library, and six specialized shops (two wood shops, art, automotive with 3 bays, machine, and drafting). It also had yellow painted lockers and 9 staircases with fire exits.

== Academics and extracurricular activities ==
Thomson has the following departments: Visual and Performing Arts; Business, Coop and Careers; English; History/Geography; Languages (including ESL and modern languages); Mathematics; Physical Education; Science; Social Studies; and Technological Studies. The school offers pre-AP and AP courses in seven subjects. David and Mary Thomson CI hosts the well-known SHSM programs: Health & Wellness SHSM, Information Communications Technology SHSM, & Horticulture and Landscaping SHSM.

In addition to above, Thomson inherited a number of courses from Bendale including construction technology, baking and cooking and technological design.

The school fields teams in many sports: archery, baseball and slo-pitch, badminton, basketball, cricket, cross country, curling, football, field and ice hockey, rugby, soccer, swimming, tennis, track and field, Ultimate Frisbee, volleyball, and wrestling. The school's team name was formerly known as the Thomson Redmen, which had a logo of a First Nations head although its football team was called Thomson Pioneers (1959–1962) for a short period. Since 2005, the school is now officially referred to as the Thomson Titans keeping the same colours but with a shield resembling the Tennessee Titans logo. The tiger claws were incorporated in 2019 to symbolize the merger with Bendale.

There are a number of music ensembles including a jazz band and a Music Executive that facilitates planning and scheduling of music events.

== Incidents ==
- In January 2019, after a fight in which the participants were reportedly armed with knives, the school was placed on lockdown. Two students believed to be involved in the altercation arrived at an area hospital suffering from non-life-threatening stab wounds. No charges were laid.
- On February 14, 2022, an 18-year-old grade 12 student, identified as Jahiem Robinson, was murdered at the end of the school day by a 14-year old student with a loaded handgun. The suspect, whose identity is withheld under the Youth Criminal Justice Act, allegedly attempted to murder a second student but fled the school after the firearm failed to discharge. He was arrested and taken into custody later in the evening and was charged with murder and attempted murder. It was the first major fatality in a TDSB high school since the fatal shooting of Jordan Manners at C. W. Jefferys Collegiate Institute in North York in 2007. The incident negatively impacted the community and elicited calls to re-establish the School Resource Officer program, introduced in 2008 but abolished in 2017 under pressure from Black Lives Matter activists, citing anti-black racism in the education system.
- On December 1, 2022, Toronto Police responded to a call regarding someone with a firearm. Police say two suspects were taken into custody with two other suspects outstanding. The school was placed on lockdown, along with its neighbouring school, Donwood Junior Public School. Four other nearby schools were placed into a hold-and-secure. No injuries were reported, and a replica firearm was located by police after a search.
- On October 12, 2023, a 15-year-old student was attacked & stabbed by two students and was brought to hospital with serious injuries. Police arrested two suspects.

== Notable alumni ==
- Hon. David Stratas, Justice of the Court Martial Appeal Court of Canada
- Jennifer Valentyne, television host
- Katie Griffin, actress and musician
- Xavier Rathan-Mayes, NBA Player
- George Kuzmicz, WHA defenseman (Toronto Toros); lawyer
- Laverne Jacobs, law professor, first Canadian member of the United Nations Committee on the Rights of Persons with Disabilities

== See also ==
- Education in Ontario
- List of secondary schools in Ontario
