= West Hill Collegiate Institute =

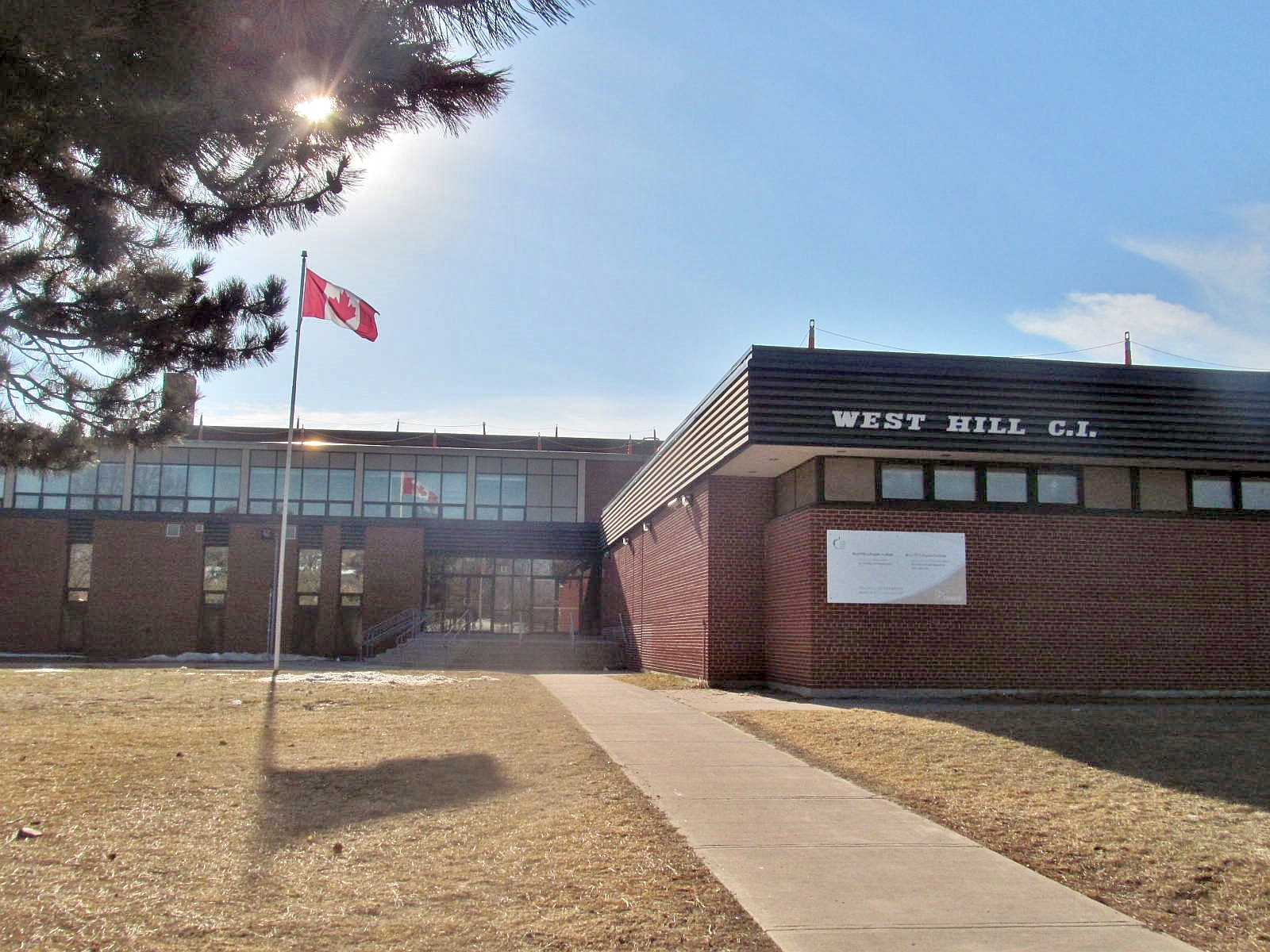
- West Hill C.I.'s entrance, constructed in the 1970s.

Location
- 350 Morningside Avenue; Toronto, Ontario, M1E 3G3; Canada; 43.775872°N 79.190550°W

Information
- School type: Public High School
- Motto: Latin: Surgo in Lucem (I rise into the light)
- Founded: September 6, 1955; 71 years ago
- School board: Toronto District School Board (Scarborough Board of Education)
- Superintendent: Manoj Patel; LN15
- Area trustee: Zumi Patel; Ward 19
- School number: 4184 / 951560
- Principal: Devanshu Patel
- Grades: 9–12
- Enrolment: 758 (2014–15)
- Language: English
- Schedule type: Semestered
- Campus size: 17.07 acres
- Area: West Hill
- Colours: Red, Grey and White
- Mascot: Wolfie the Wolf
- Team name: West Hill Warriors; West Hill Lady Warriors
- Yearbook: Afterglow
- Website: schoolweb.tdsb.on.ca/westhillci
- Last updated: April 17, 2025

West Hill Collegiate Institute (also called West Hill CI, WHCI or West Hill) is a public high school in Toronto, Ontario, Canada, located in eastern Scarborough in the neighbourhood of West Hill. It is under the jurisdiction of the Toronto District School Board. From its founding until 1998, it was part of the legacy Scarborough Board of Education.

The school was opened in 1955 and named after the community of West Hill in which the school is located. It is a non-semestered composite high school and home of the Science, Technology, Engineering and Mathematics (STEM) Centre of Innovation program.

West Hill C.I.'s motto is Surgo in Lucem which translates as I rise into the light.

== History ==
With population growth increasing, the newly-formed Scarborough Board of Education (a board forerunner to the TDSB) opened several new schools beginning in the mid-late 1950s. Before the construction of the new local high school, students who lived in the West Hill area attended Scarborough Collegiate Institute (renamed to R.H. King in 1954).

The school, now known as West Hill Collegiate Institute began its construction 1954 and the staff was in place in May 1954. On May 31, 1954, SBE acquired an additional seven acres for the new school. As its fourth high school in the borough, West Hill Collegiate Institute opened its doors on September 6, 1955, with 25 staff and 376 students along with its first principal, Harvey A.C. Farrow and vice-principal Francis S. Jennings. The original building was designed by the Toronto-based architectural firm Carter, Coleman and Rankin Associates. West Hill C.I. was officially opened on December 14, 1955.

From the beginning, the original building consisted of 27 classrooms, a library, main office, gymnatorium, and cafeteria. Expansion of the school had resulted additional construction of 12 classrooms in 1959, followed by the auditorium in 1963, and the second gymnasium and swimming pool in 1971. By 1977, West Hill held with 2131 students with 100 teachers. Today, West Hill capacity can be up to 1407 students.

In 2002, West Hill was noted for beating rival R. H. King Academy 150 to 58 in a basketball game in which West Hill star Denham Brown scored 13 three pointers.

From the 2009-10 school year, West Hill kept the Warriors moniker, but the Native American head, which was used since its inception, was replaced with a stylized Trojan mascot in 2010.

West Hill Collegiate Institute was one of several Toronto high schools with low enrolment rates that were placed under Pupil Accommodation Review in 2015 by the Toronto school board.

=== Crest ===
The crest for West Hill consists of a red shield with a white shield bordered in black and silver containing a red sun on the top, between a magic lantern (commonly found on most school logos in the TDSB) and a sheaf is the school motto, "Surgo in Lucem" (I rise into the light) in a black banner. On the bottom of the crest, there is the white banner inscription that reads "West Hill Collegiate Institute".

== Campus ==
West Hill is located near the intersection of Kingston Rd and Morningside Avenue. Houses are to the west and Highland Creek to the north and east. It is next to Morningside Park, and close to the University of Toronto Scarborough and Centennial College as well as nearby separate school, St. John Paul II Catholic Secondary School.

West Hill shares the same design as Winston Churchill Collegiate Institute and has since altered over time. It began with 27 rooms but the school underwent a renovation during the 1970s to create an additional 50 classrooms, four gymnasiums, a library (named after West Hill's first principal, H.A.C. Farrow), two studios for the Drama Department, workshop rooms, and a quad to enable creative learning opportunities for studies in science. The area's revival took over a decade, and won several environmental awards. In addition, it serves as working grounds for visual arts students. The school holds a swimming pool in its southwest wing, which is open to staff, students, and the community.

== Programs ==
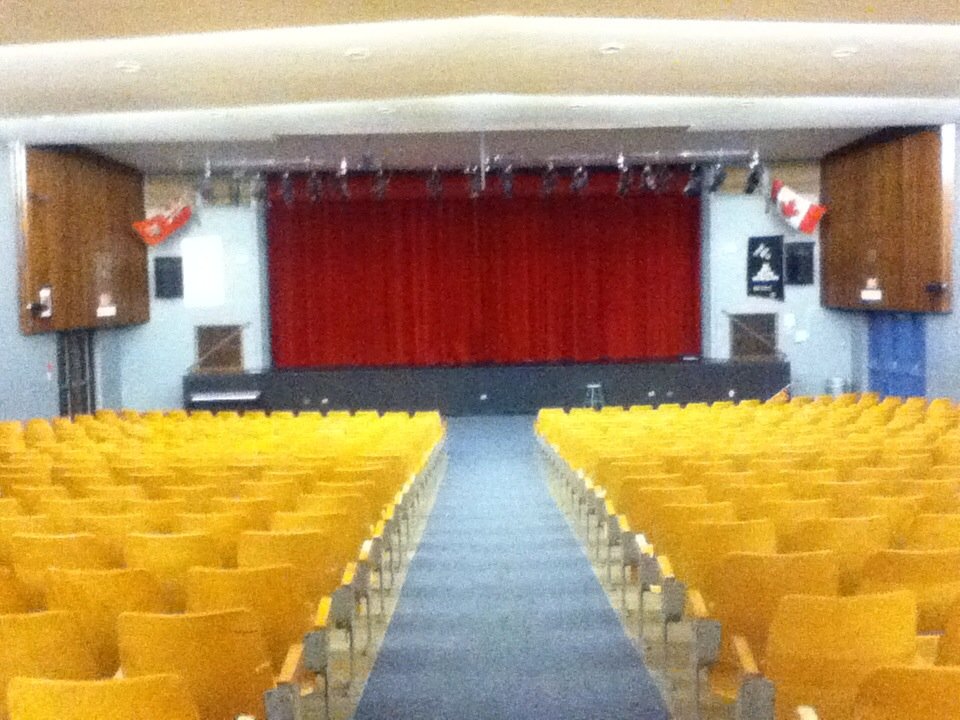
The 598-seated Francis S. Jennings Auditorium.

=== Athletics ===
West Hill Collegiate Institute's physical education department has a student-run council (West Hill Athletic Council or WHAC), which organizes school spirit assemblies, the Athletic Banquet, and intramural sports.

=== Arts ===
The Drama Department participates in the Ontario Sears Drama Festival, and every winter, they perform a play. West Hill has a concert band which has competed in music competitions since the 1980s and have ranked first several times. The Music Department features two annual concerts: one in winter for the holidays and one in the spring called, "Music in May".

=== Leadership ===
The Student Activity Council (SAC) plans and executes events and activities for the student body such as Grade 9 Orientation Day, Welcome Back Carnival, Holiday Concert, Semi-Formal and Prom. Students are elected for SAC positions every June and decisions are made by the student body.

The Prefects consists of students in grade 10 to 12 who are selected by teachers at the end of every school year. Prefects volunteer at events during the school year and occasionally organize their own events. Student philanthropists participate in an organization called Me to We which aims to make positive differences for society on a local and global level through events throughout the school year.

=== Culture ===
As a multicultural school, West Hill has clubs to reflect the culture and ethnic minorities present in the school. Some of the cultural clubs at WHCI include the Desi Club, Afro-Canadian Association, Muslim Student Association, Bengali Student Association, and West Indian Club, all of which perform in the school's multicultural assemblies. WHCI's Multicultural Committee plans and executes Food Fiestas and an annual Multicultural Night.

=== Academics ===
West Hill offers Advanced Placement opportunities in Mathematics, English, Chemistry, Biology and Physics which prepare students for studies at university. The West Hill Physics Club goes to McMaster University's Science Olympics every year. They have won the Paper Triathlon and placed third in Twist and Turn, a protein building exercise. The Robotics Club, SWATT (Scarborough Warriors at the Top) Team #1088, competed in the 2003 FIRST Robotics Competitions. As rookies, they won three awards: first place in the Canadian Regional Championships, Engineering Design and the Kleiner Perkins Caufield and Byers Entrepreneurship Awards. The team travelled to Houston, Texas that year to compete at the FIRST Championship; the following year, they went to Atlanta, Georgia. This club is inactive.

== Ranking ==
The Fraser Institute gave West Hill C.I. an overall rating of 4.1/10 for the 2016–2017 school year, when the school was ranked 663 out of 747 Ontario high schools.

== Notable alumni ==
Notable alumni of West Hill Collegiate Institute include:

- The Weeknd (Abel Tesfaye) – Grammy Award-winning singer, songwriter, and producer
- Rowan Barrett – St. John's University basketball player, top scorer in the 2002 Israel Basketball Premier League, and member of Canada men's national basketball team.
- Denham Brown – UConn basketball player, drafted to the National Basketball Association (NBA) by the Seattle SuperSonics
- Delroy Clarke – football player for the Toronto Argonauts of the Canadian Football League (CFL)
- Judith Cowan – academic and writer
- Denise Donlon – Sony Music Canada president
- Norm Foster – playwright
- John Hiller – Major League Baseball pitcher for the Detroit Tigers
- Kyle Johnson – LIU Brooklyn and Great Britain national basketball team player
- Usman Limbada – Canadian professional cricketer in the Canada national cricket team
- Liam McMorrow – professional basketball player
- Craig Russell – performer and female impersonator
- Al Secord – National Hockey League (NHL) hockey player.
- Jevohn Shepherd – Michigan basketball player who professional basketball player in Europe
- Chris Stewart – NHL hockey player
- Paul Tracy – professional automobile racer
- Joan Barfoot – novelist

== See also ==
- Education in Ontario
- List of secondary schools in Ontario
