= Birchmount Park Collegiate Institute =

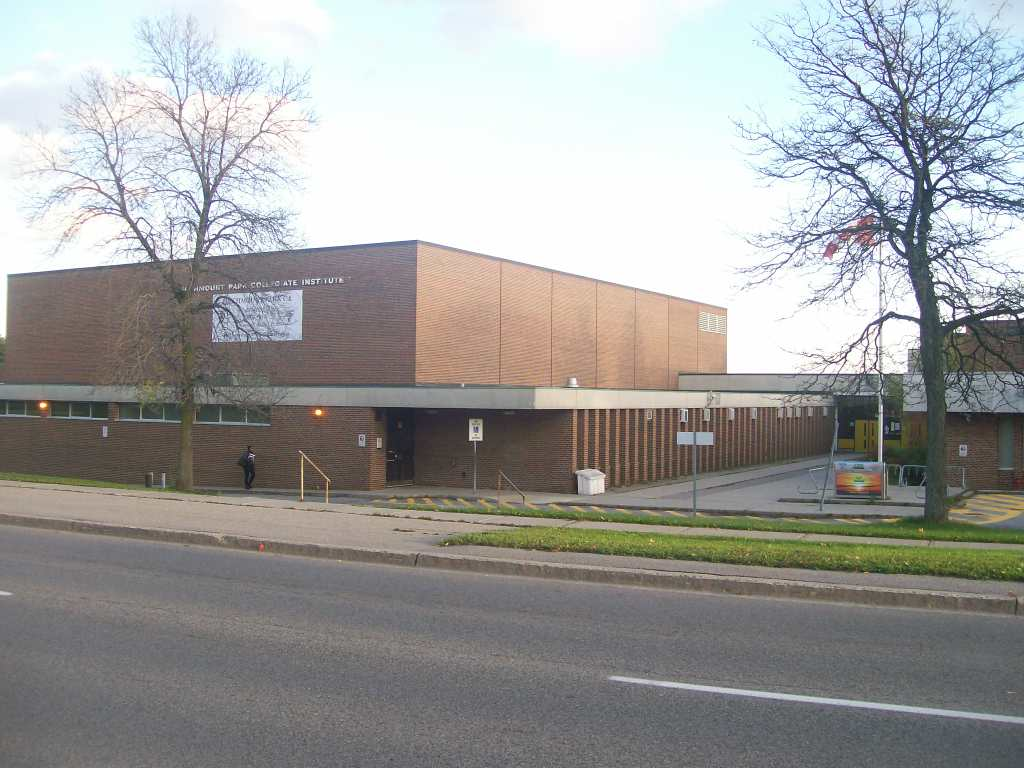
- Birchmount Park Collegiate Institute in 2013.

Location
- 3663 Danforth Avenue; Birch Cliff, Scarborough, Toronto, Ontario, M1N 2G2; Canada; 43°41′52″N 79°15′35″W

Information
- School type: Public, high school
- Motto: Latin: Veritas Omnia Vincit (Truth Conquers All)
- Founded: 1964
- School board: Toronto District School Board (Scarborough Board of Education)
- School district: South-east
- Superintendent: Sara Gogani
- Area trustee: Malika Ghous; Ward 18
- School number: 4118 / 895016
- Administrator: Beatrice Kay
- Principal: Angelo Kontos
- Grades: 9-12
- Enrolment: 982 (2014-15)
- Language: English
- Schedule type: Semestered
- Campus: Suburban
- Colours: Blue, Gold, Black and White
- Mascot: Panther
- Team name: Birchmount Park Panthers
- Website: schoolweb.tdsb.on.ca/birchmountpark/
- Last updated: April 23, 2025

Birchmount Park Collegiate Institute (BPCI) is a high school in Toronto, Ontario, Canada. It is located in the Birch Cliff neighbourhood of the former suburb of Scarborough operated under the Toronto District School Board. Before 1998, this school was part of the legacy Scarborough Board of Education.

The school was opened in 1964 as a composite secondary school and has since served over 1,000 students in the southwestern Scarborough community. BPCI sits atop on the Scarborough Bluffs overlooking Lake Ontario in what is once the shores of Glacial Lake Iroquois and Birchmount Park itself. The motto is Veritas Omnia Vincit ("Truth conquers all").

== History ==
To provide additional crowds in the southern Scarborough community, Birchmount Park Collegiate Institute was constructed in May 1963 and accepted by the Scarborough Board of Education in July 1964. The school, as the tenth collegiate, opened its doors on September 8, 1964, with its first principal, John H. Edwards. The structure of the 1900-pupil school were designed by architects Sidney Bregman and George Hamann. Prior to the opening, the students in the area previously attended nearby collegiates such as R.H. King, Midland, and W. A. Porter as well as Malvern in the eastern end of Toronto.

Birchmount Park's Adult Re-Entry program for the Scarborough Board of Education was established in November 1977 with one teacher and fifteen students that evolved into Scarborough Centre for Alternative Studies in September 1986 opened at Tabor Park Vocational School on Midland Avenue.

In 1998, the SBE ceased to exist and BPCI became part of the newly-formed Toronto District School Board.

The school became a movie feature of the 1986 film Youngblood and 2003 film How to Deal as well as the 2004 film Confessions of a Teenage Drama Queen.

The school along with other schools in greater Toronto area started to offer an "anti-black racism course" to combat racism in the communities starting in 2021.

In November 2022, a 17 year old student was left in critical but stable condition after being stabbed on school premises. This marked the second stabbing to take place at the school in 2022 after a 14 year old student was stabbed in late April.

== Overview ==
=== Facilities ===
Birchmount Park Collegiate is located in a 9.057-acre site. The structure is combined with load-bearing walls and steel-frame construction as well as window area reduced to save costs (although the design bear resemblance to Wexford Collegiate School for the Arts).

The 181,114-square-foot campus has 22 classrooms, lecture room, music room, drama room, six science labs, art room, home economics room, a library, three gymnasia (that can be partitioned into smaller gyms), a weight room, 1045-seated auditorium built in a style of a theatre, cafeteria with kitchen, administrative and guidance offices, and technical shops for electrical, automotive, carpentry and metal. Attached to Birchmount Park is Birchmount Stadium with the 400m race track and sports field with artificial turf.

=== Athletics ===
The school started the Birchmount Exceptional Athlete Program (BEAP) in September 1989, Two classes from the BEAP program were among the 12 courses cancelled at this school in 2019 due to funding cuts.

== Notable alumni ==
- Aaron Brown, Olympic medallist
- Clifton Dawson, professional football player
- Crispin Duenas, Olympian; archer
- Brandon Pirri, professional hockey player
- Wayne Simmonds, professional hockey player
- Devante Smith-Pelly, professional hockey player
- Tim Smith, professional baseball player
- Anthony Stewart, professional hockey player
- The Weeknd (Abel Tesfaye), Grammy Award-winning musician
- Tyler Toffoli, professional hockey player
- Justyn Warner, Olympian; professional track athlete
- Ian Warner, Olympian
- Russell Williams, serial killer
- Peter Zezel, professional hockey player
- Jennifer Cross, professional volleyball player, team Canada Captain.

== See also ==
- Education in Ontario
- List of secondary schools in Ontario
