= Scarborough Centre for Alternative Studies =

Scarborough Centre for Alternative Studies (Midland Campus)
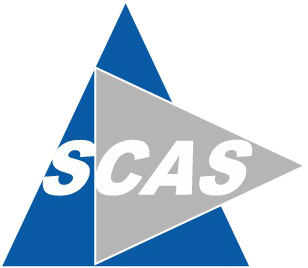

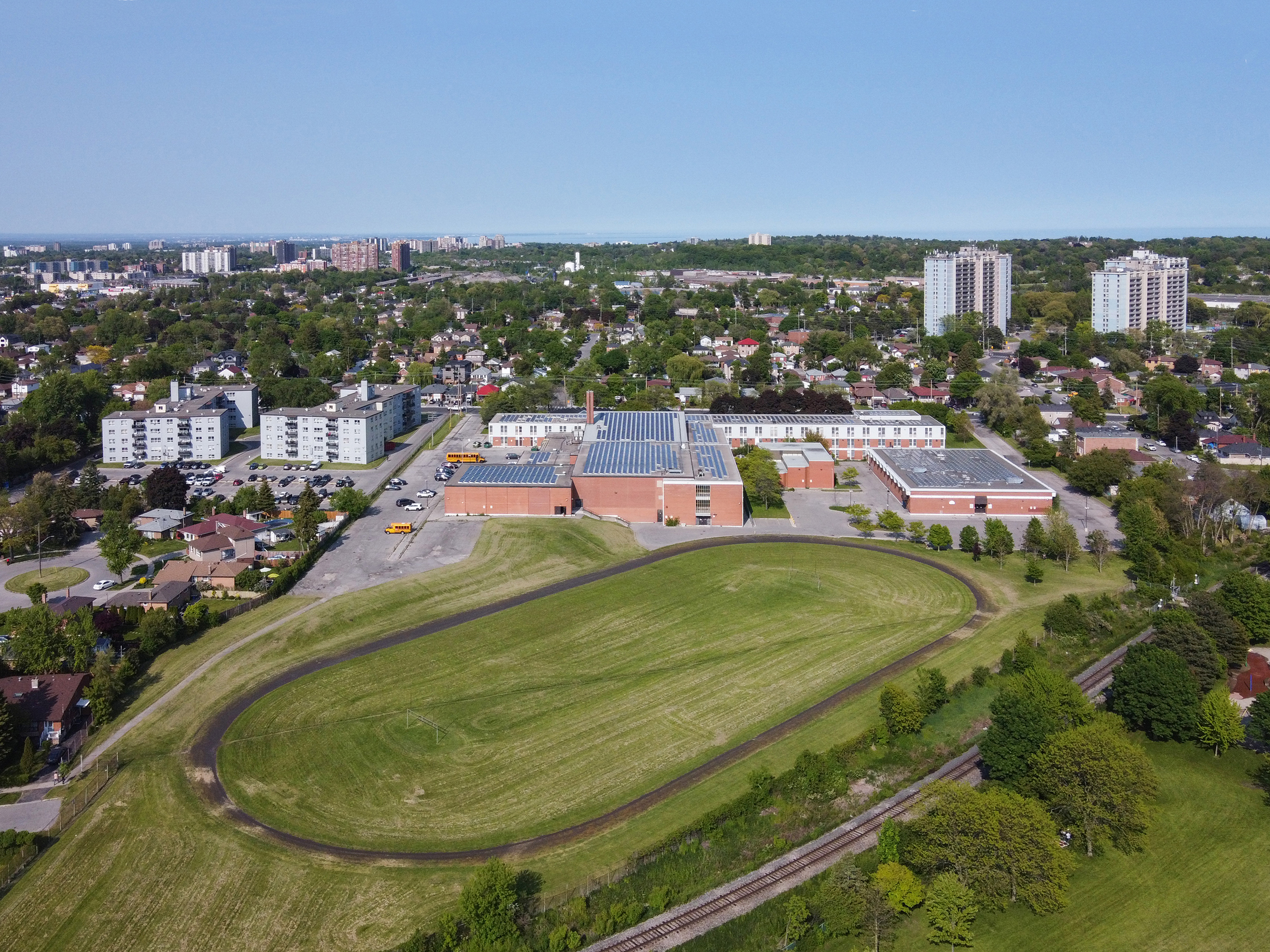
- Scarborough Centre for Alternative Studies in the former Midland Avenue C.I. building, since 2010.

Location
- 720 Midland Avenue; Scarborough, Toronto, Ontario, M1K 4C9; Canada; 43.728364°N 79.25549°W

Information
- Former name: Tabor Park Vocational School
- School type: Alternative High School; Adult High School
- Motto: Fast forward your future Accomplish as you may
- Religious affiliation: Secular
- Founded: 1986
- Status: Active (Midland); Leased out (Tabor Park); Sold (Progress)
- School board: Toronto District School Board (Scarborough Board of Education)
- Superintendent: Brendan Browne; LC3, Executive; Diana Panagiotopoulos; LN17
- Area trustee: Parthi Kandavel; Ward 18
- School number: 4175 / 940445; 4177 / 940445
- Administrator: Ronda Sinclair
- Principal: Melissa Spencer
- Grades: 10-12
- Enrolment: 1689 (2014-15)
- Language: English
- Colours: Blue and Silver
- Mascot: Eagle
- Team name: SCAS Eagles
- Website: scasonline.com

Scarborough Centre for Alternative Studies (SCAS), formerly Tabor Park Vocational School is an alternative and adult high school serving Scarborough, a part of Toronto, Ontario, Canada. The school operates under the Toronto District School Board serving grades 10-12. Prior to 1998, it was part of the Scarborough Board of Education.

Originated at Birchmount Park Collegiate Institute in 1977 as the re-entry program, the school opened in 1986 at the Tabor Park building and as of 2010, this school is located on the campus of the former Midland Avenue Collegiate Institute sharing with the fellow schools, South East Year Round Alternative Centre and Caring and Safe Schools Alternative Program Area C. SCAS is located on Midland Avenue south of Eglinton Avenue East.

== History ==
Scarborough Centre for Alternative Studies Historical Campuses

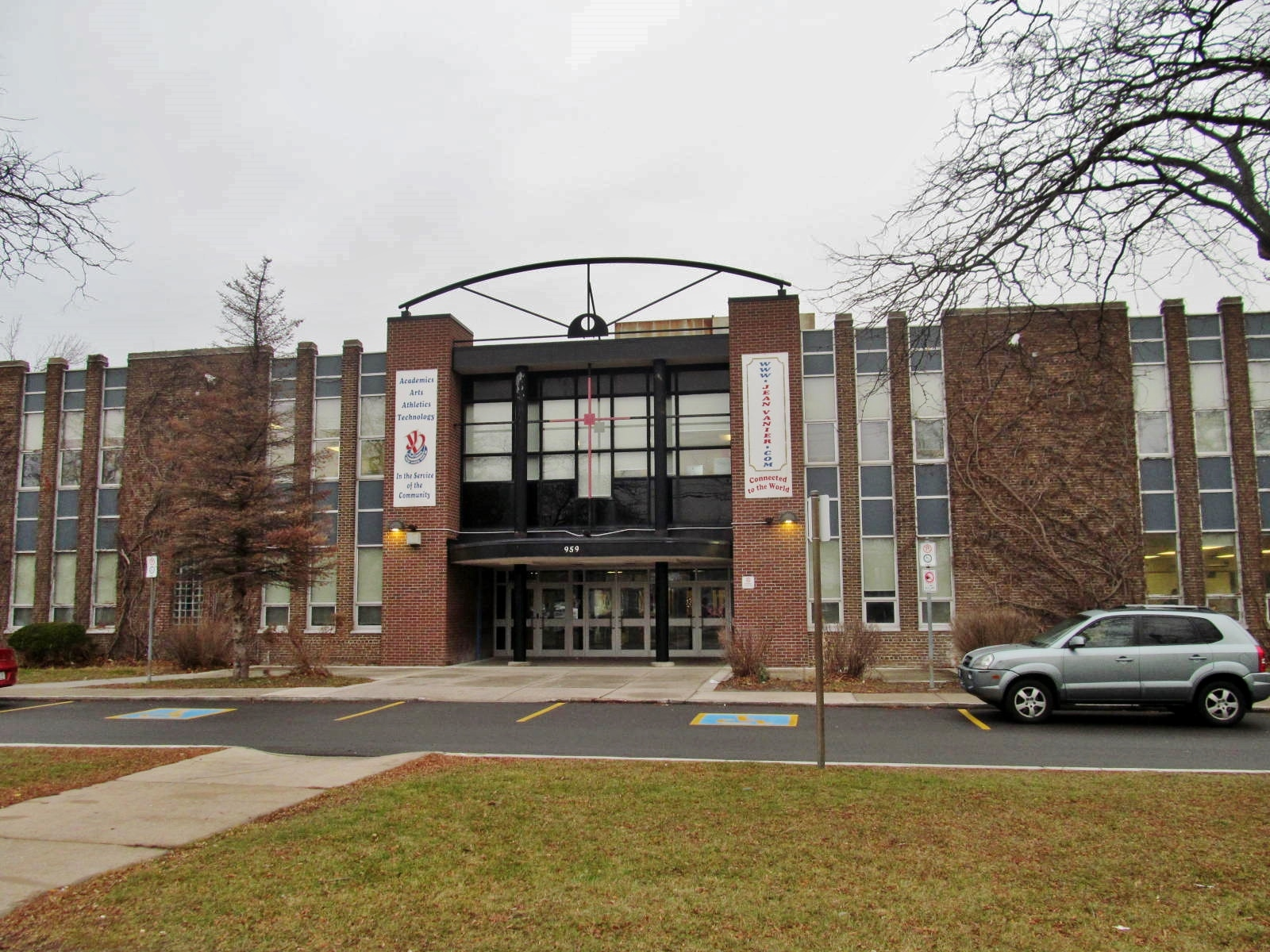
Original SCAS Building at the former Tabor Park.

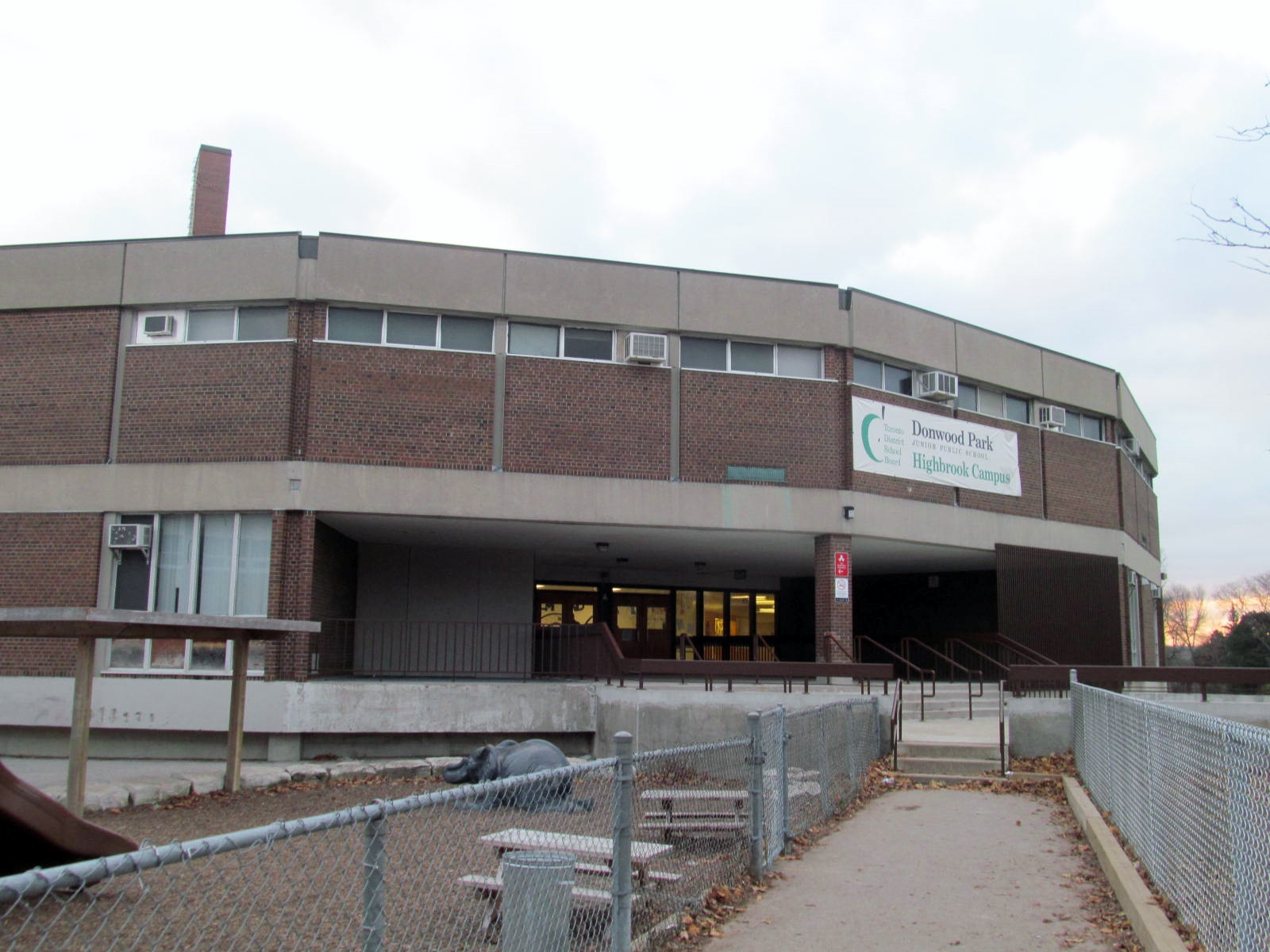
SCAS in Highbrook grounds from 1989-1994 after the Tabor Park property was transferred to the Catholic board. The building previously housed the Overflow Centre.

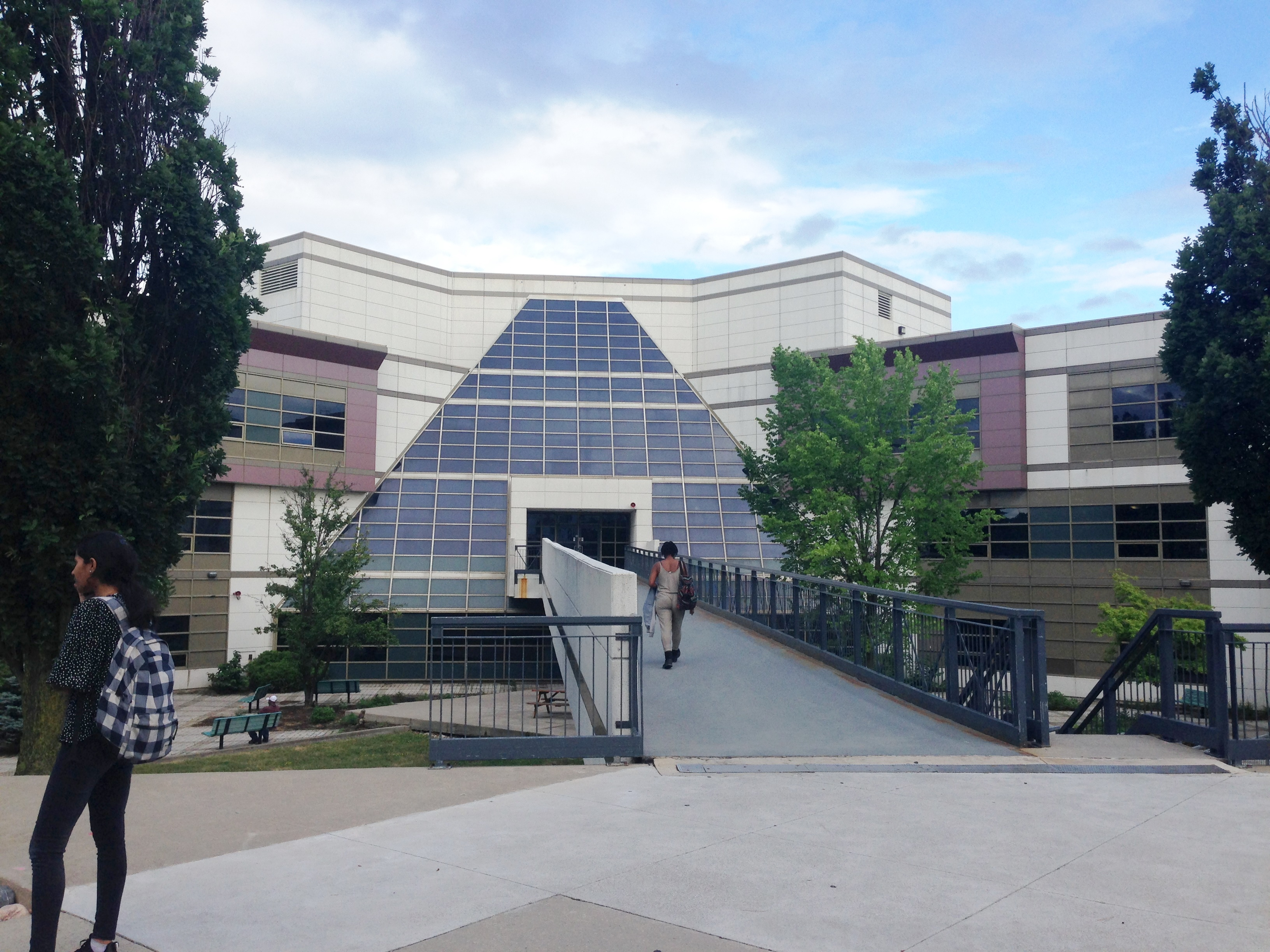
Former SCAS campus built in Centennial College Progress Campus lands from 1994-2010.

=== Beginnings ===
The Re-entry Program in Scarborough began in November 1977 at Birchmount Park Collegiate Institute with one teacher and fifteen students. Envisioned was a program which would meet the needs of dropouts or disadvantaged learners wishing to return to school; the program had grown and transformed into an adult program. By 1985, the program featured 9.33 teachers and 200 students.

In 1980, the Co-Op Re-entry Program was established. The program featured an in-school component with a job experience placement and grew from the original two teachers and 35 students to 5 teachers and 170 students in 1986.

Formerly known as Tabor Park Vocational School, the Re-entry Programs were united and expanded as Scarborough Centre for Alternative Studies originally opened on September 2, 1986 at 959 Midland Avenue operated by the Scarborough Board of Education with 360 adults. At Tabor Park, agencies operating at SCAS included a rooms registry service called Scarborough Housing Assistance: Placement and Education for Singles (SHAPES), the counseling service Metro Youth Services, a day care facility operated by NYAD (Not Your Average Day Care), and the board's Community Liaison Office.

=== Relocation ===
In May 1988, the SBE was planning to move the SCAS to a new facility. The Tabor Park campus was one of seven high schools in the Metro being given to the Metropolitan Separate School Board (now the Toronto Catholic District School Board), so the Scarborough board had to vacate it along with the user groups. School board trustees considered closing one of the following collegiate schools to make room for a new SCAS: Winston Churchill, Midland, Wexford, W.A. Porter, and David and Mary Thomson. In November 1988 the school had 850 adult students. Parents in Donwood Park protested one of the relocation plans for SCAS.

Meanwhile, the SBE moved classes as a method to quickly find a temporary location before the Tabor Park property being transferred to the MSSB on July 1, 1989. To save the costs, 28 classes were moved to the former Highbrook Senior Public School on 39 Highbrook Drive, Thomson Collegiate received 20 classes at 2740 Lawrence Avenue East (along with the Carpentry program) and moved the remaining six to a commercial site in the area totaling to 54 classes.

The original SCAS campus was reopened and became known as Jean Vanier Catholic Secondary School in September 1989. The need for a new adult school led to a 'unique partnership' between the SBE and Centennial College, in 1992, to establish the new campus for SCAS, (originally the Scarborough Career Planning Centre) on 939 Progress Avenue that opened in September 1994. The programs were previously had been in temporary locations after the loss of Tabor Park.

After 16 years, in September 2010, the school moved to 720 Midland Avenue, the site of the former Midland Avenue Collegiate Institute as Centennial expanded the teaching space by acquiring the latter site. The centre currently shares the Midland building with South East Year Round Alternative Centre and Caring and Safe Schools program.

SCAS also operated a satellite campus at the David and Mary Thomson Collegiate Institute for the Carpentry (Fix-It Shop) program until the Lawrence building was closed at the end of June 2019.

== See also ==
- List of high schools in Ontario
- Midland Avenue Collegiate Institute
- St. Joan of Arc Catholic Academy
