= Bond Education Group =

Canadian operator of private schools

Coordinates: 43.756944°N 79.288611°W

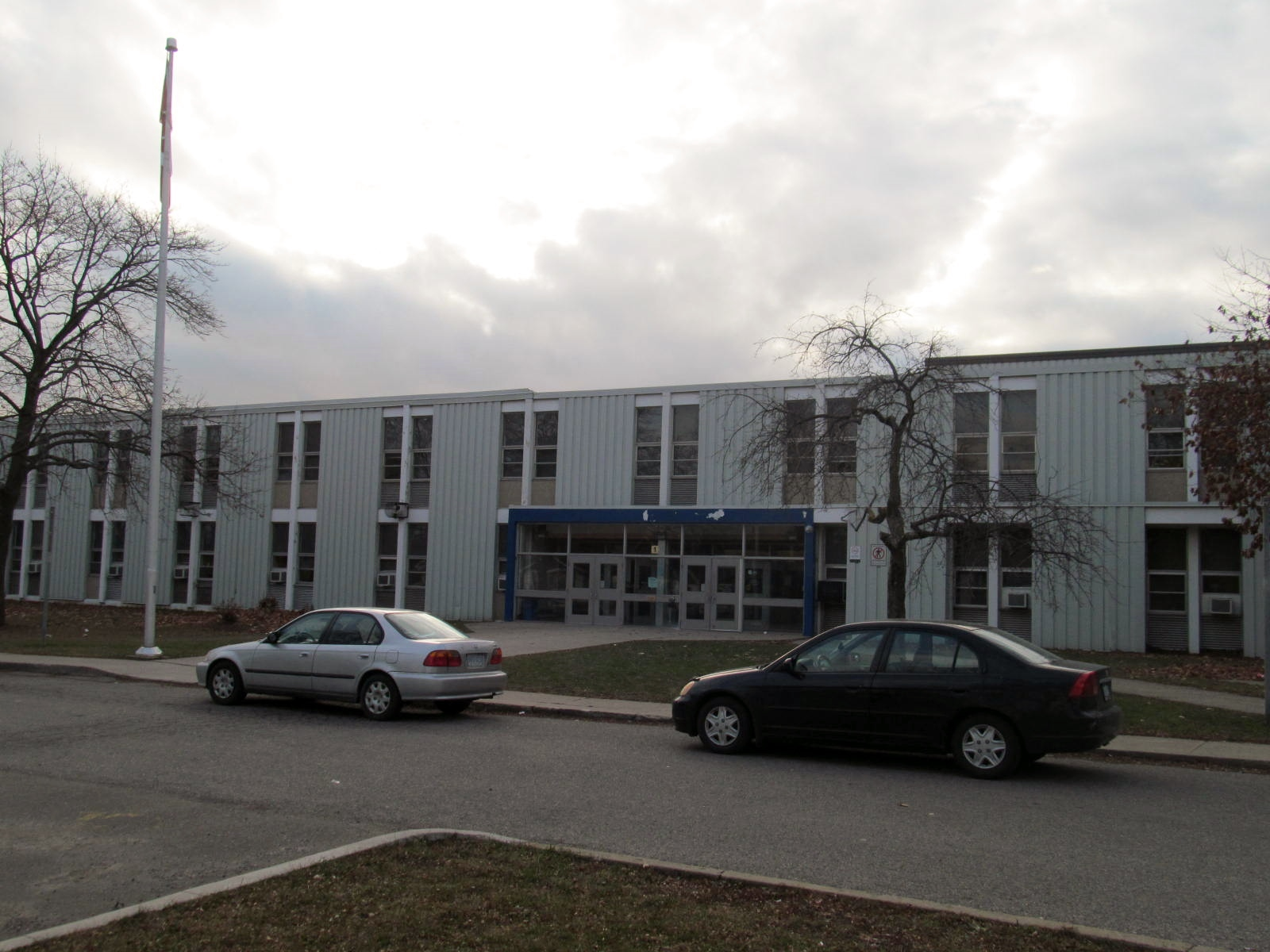
Bond Academy seen at the former home of Midland Avenue Collegiate Institute (2001-2010), has since relocated to the former Laura Secord Chocolates factory building.

Bond Education Group operates several private schools in Toronto, Ontario. It was established in 1978 and as of 2015, located at 1500 Birchmount Road in Scarborough, originally the former factory of Laura Secord Chocolates.

Bond Education Group consists of the following schools:

- Bond Academy; a co-educational, non-denominational independent school with classes for pre-school children up to grade 12. It includes:
  - Bond Montessori Casa; providing Montessori education for pre-school children
- Bond International College; offers international students a Canadian education in a diverse, multicultural environment
- Bond Schools International; a program where schools in China are offering a Double Diploma Program for an Ontario Secondary School Diploma and Chinese High School Diploma
- Bond Centre for Leadership and Management Development; a professional training division
- New Skills College of Health, Business & Technology; offers post-secondary training in health care, business and technology fields.

== See also ==
- List of high schools in Ontario
