= Carter, Coleman and Rankin Associates =

Canadian architectural firm

Carter, Coleman and Rankin Associates was a Toronto-based architectural firm responsible for building several high schools for the then Scarborough Board of Education in the 1950s. The firms' work on these schools were influenced by International Style during the post War period.

== Architects ==
Harold E. Carter (1885–1956) was an English born and came to Canada to practice in 1909. Carter worked for several firms including Chapman & McGiffin, Sproatt & Rolph and Henry J. Burden and George Roper Gouinlock before forming his own firm in 1948. Carter died in 1956.

Ervine Milne Coleman (1900–1980) joined with Carter in 1948 to form Carter and Coleman after working for Canadian Bank of Commerce as staff architect in 1932. Coleman would continue the practice after Carter's death in 1956.

== Projects ==
- R. H. King Collegiate additions 1949-1950 - note Carter worked with Burden and Gouinlock on the original school 1922 wing
- Winston Churchill Collegiate Institute 1953-1954
- West Hill Collegiate Institute 1954-1955
- W. A. Porter Collegiate Institute 1957-1958
- Scarborough Board of Education Head Office 1956-57
- Scarborough Municipal Hall 1957-58

=== Others ===
- Toronto City Hall competition 1958
