= R. H. King Academy =

School in Scarborough, Toronto, Canada

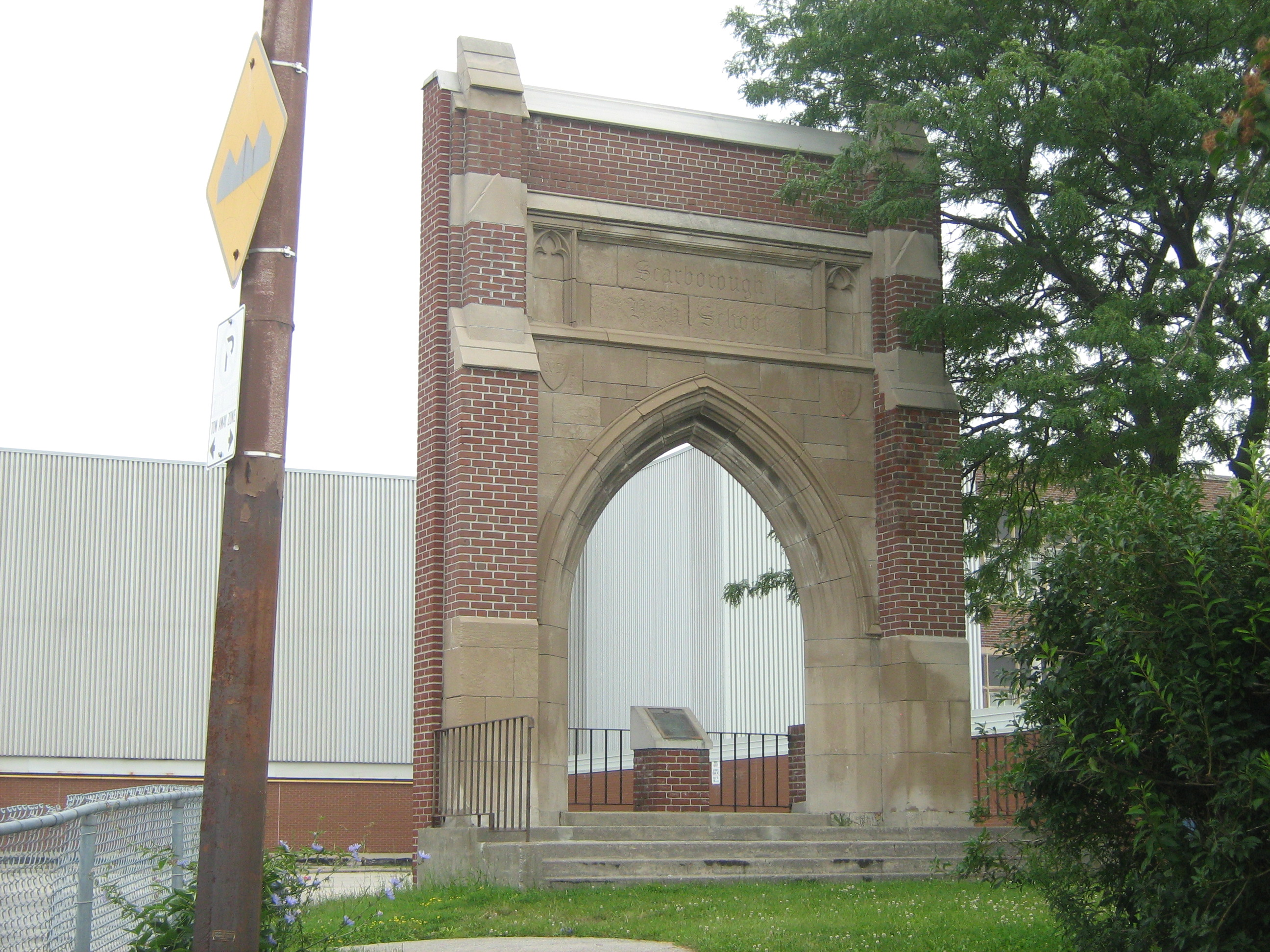

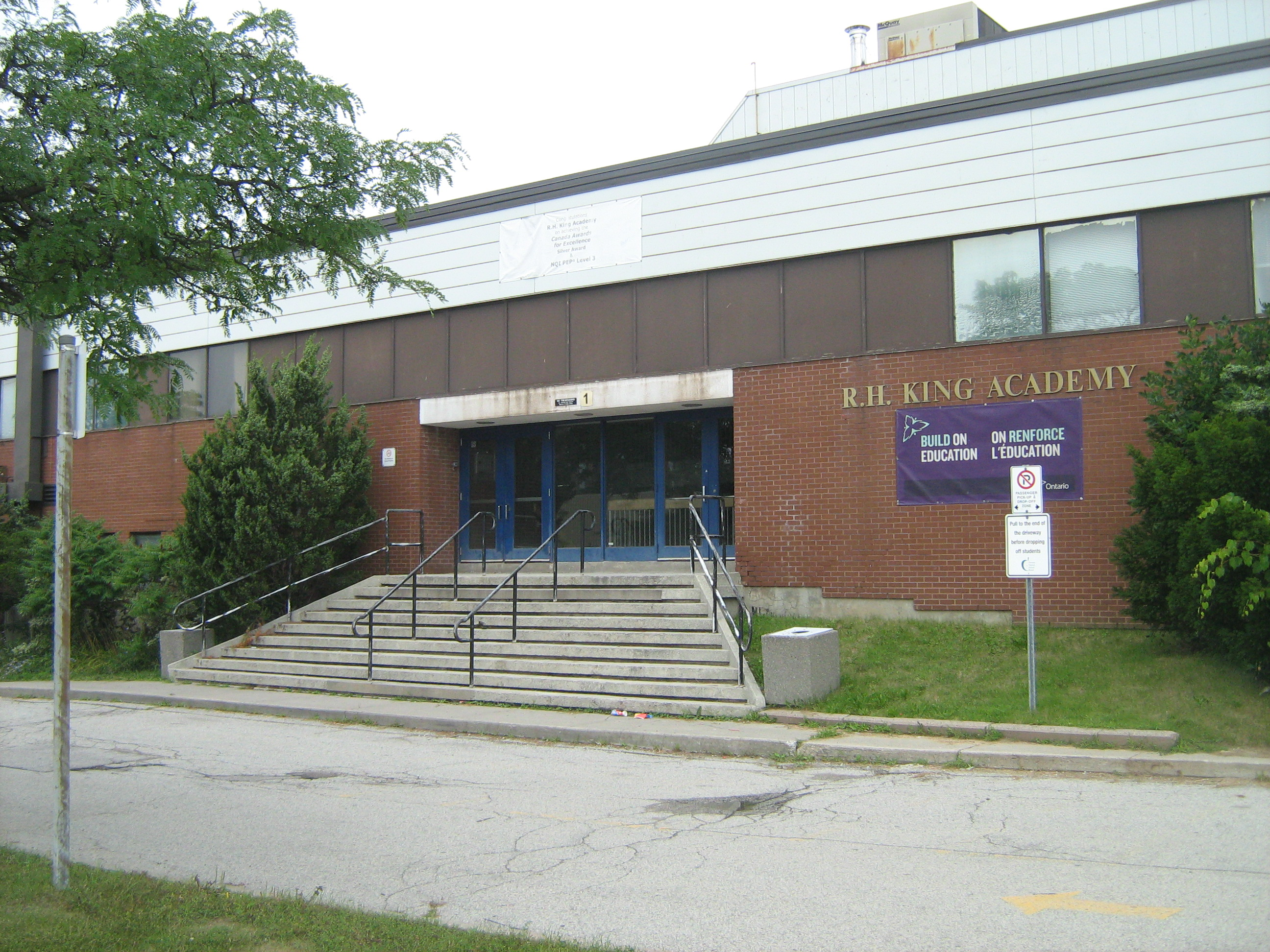
- The main archway to the school, one of the original components of the 1922 building, shown in the center (top); Modern school building, partially built in 1975 on the western parking lot (bottom)

Location
- 3800 St. Clair Avenue East; Scarborough, Toronto, Ontario, M1M 1V3; Canada; 43°43′20″N 79°14′15″W

Information
- Former name: Scarborough High School (1922–1930); Scarborough Collegiate Institute (1930–1954); R.H. King Collegiate Institute (1954–1989)
- School type: Public, alternative magnet high school
- Motto: Latin: Per Ardua Sapientia (Through the hard task of wisdom)
- Founded: September 6, 1922; 104 years ago at Birch Cliff Congregational Church
- School board: Toronto District School Board; (Scarborough Board of Education)
- Oversight: Toronto Lands Corporation
- Superintendent: Brendan Browne; LC3, Executive; Diana Panagiotopoulos; LN17
- Area trustee: Parthi Kandvel; Ward 18
- School number: 4148 / 937266
- Administrator: Shanta Das
- Principal: Saby Chandi
- Grades: 9–12
- Enrolment: 1,316 (2020–21)
- Language: English
- Colours: Black, navy, light blue, grey and gold
- Slogan: Latin: Diligimus Quaerimus Servimus (We care, we strive, we serve)
- Mascot: Kingsley lion
- Team name: King Lions
- Newspaper: Kingsley Voice
- Yearbook: The Bluff
- Affiliation: Secular
- Website: schoolweb.tdsb.on.ca/rhkingacademy

R. H. King Academy, formerly known as Scarborough High School, Scarborough Collegiate Institute and R.H. King Collegiate Institute is a secondary school and a de facto alternative school located in Scarborough, Toronto, part of the Toronto District School Board. Prior to 1998, the school was part of the legacy Scarborough Board of Education.

The school was established in 1922 as the first secondary school built in the former township of Scarborough and second-oldest surviving institution in Scarborough, after Agincourt Collegiate Institute, then became a collegiate in 1930, renamed in 1954 and again in 1989 as a quasi-elite level academy. This school was named after Reginald Harold King (February 16, 1896 – November 4, 1962), a Canadian educator and classicist.

Today, R.H. King serves as a semestered secondary school serving Grades 9 to 12, known with a distinctive timetable, leadership pathways and dynamic extra-curricular and athletics programs. The R. H. King school motto is "Per Ardua Sapientia" which translates into Through the hard task of wisdom.

== History ==
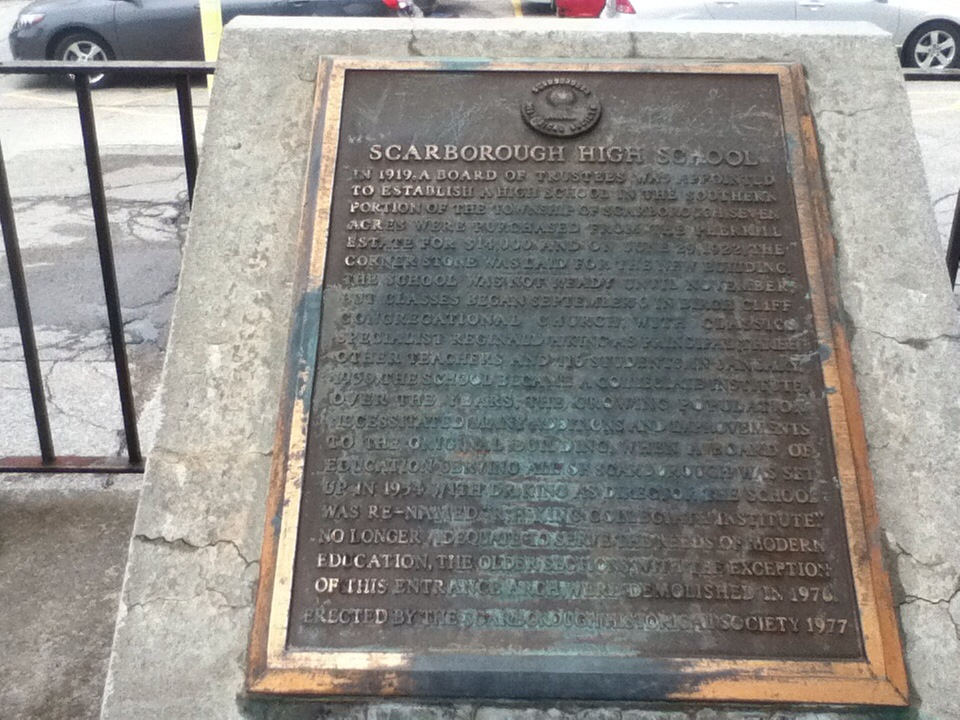
The inscription of the plaque written by the Scarborough Historical Society dated 1977, pictured 2015. A new version of the exterior plaque was reissued by the 2020s.

Founded in 1922 as Scarborough High School, the school became Scarborough Collegiate Institute in January 1930, before becoming R. H. King Collegiate Institute in 1954, and being renamed again to R. H. King Academy in 1989.

=== Scarborough High School (1922–1930) ===
In 1919, the Township Council of Scarborough received a letter from the City of Toronto that it would have many students from Scarborough to turn away who wished to attend East Toronto High School. A council of public school trustees decided to form a High School District, but this was unheard of for a rural community such as Scarborough. There was no provision in the High School Act, so legislation was put through the offices of George S. Henry, Member of Provincial Parliament. The Government of Ontario passed the legislation and Scarborough High School was born. The first Board of Trustees was set up by the end of 1919.

The Board finally made the move to begin construction in 1922. The Board of Trustees purchased seven acres of land from the farms owned by the family of David Pherrill for $14,000 and on June 29, 1922, the cornerstone was erected for the new building. The next step was to find a principal and staff for the new school.

After reviewing many qualified applicants, the Board chose Dr. Reginald Harold King for the position of principal. Dr. King served the military during World War I and was a Classics Specialist. King, the first principal, served 32 years, although his education career began in Newmarket, Ontario. The school building was still under construction but classes began on September 6, 1922, in the basement of Birch Cliff Congregational Church with Dr. King, three staff members and 116 students. Designed by the architects Burden, Gouinlock, and Harold Carter, the Collegiate Gothic school building finally opened for classes on November 11, 1922, and the official opening was held on December 15, 1922. The first few months of the school year in 1922 began at Birch Cliff Congregational Church.

Scarborough H.S. took pride in its history from the beginning, recording its events in an annual edition of the local newspaper "The Advertiser". It wasn't until 1928 that Scarborough High School had its own yearbook, "The Scarborough Bluff", celebrating its first 5 years, published in cooperation with the "Agincourt Sense-or", for Agincourt Continuation School.

By 1928, the school population dramatically grew up to 300, with new Commercial courses being offered and talk of expansion.

=== Scarborough Collegiate Institute (1930–1954) ===
In January 1930, Scarborough High School went through its first change of many, to officially become Scarborough Collegiate Institute. This brought about more growth and the first addition to the school in 1932, despite The Great Depression. As time went on, however, the Depression began to take hold and the financial position of the Township changed. The population of the school continued to grow but the Township could no longer pay the teachers' salaries. To maintain the education of the students and the well-being of the staff, teachers were paid with food stamps to provide food for their families.

Beginning in September 1939, there was a new challenge for the students of Scarborough Collegiate: World War II. As another war began against Nazi Germany and Fascist Italy in Europe and Imperial Japan and Asia, a new call for soldiers went out and SCI. responded with spirit. Students and staff of SCI, by the end of World War II, had invested over $25,000 in War Saving Certificates and close to $5,000 for overseas parcels and the Scarborough Red Cross. Many of the SCI students were decorated with medals or honours for their efforts, and in 1945 or 1946, there was a party for those 600 people who returned. The sixty-two students who perished during the war are still honoured in the school's War Memorial, and at the annual Remembrance Day Assembly.

In 1947, Scarborough Collegiate Institute celebrated its first 25 years, with a dance, cake and special magazine. S.C.I. had grown into a school with a strong tradition in sports such as Hockey, Basketball, Rugby, Student Clubs and some new problems – Double Shifts. The Double Shift was a programme that continued until 1952 when the next addition was completed. The Double Shifts were as follows:

- The first shift for Grades 9 and 10 started at 8 am and ran until 1 pm.
- The second shift for Grades 11, 12 and 13 started classes at 1 pm and ran until 6 pm.

The same teachers taught the whole day, and to make matters more challenging, the power was turned off at 4 pm to save electricity. Light for the remainder of the day came from two lanterns hanging in the middle of the class, with the teacher giving individual instruction. Due to space constraints, classes also took place in the halls and in sections of the cafeteria.

The 1952–53-year brought new facilities such as the library (later called the Heritage Room), a new gymnasium, and classroom space. The enlarged annex was designed by the architects Carter, Coleman and Rankin Associates. SCI was still growing at an incredible rate because in 1954 the double shift programme was re-introduced temporarily until new facilities were complete.

=== R. H. King Collegiate Institute (1954–1989) ===
In 1954, Dr. King, who had been principal for the past 32 years, became the Director for the newly-formed Scarborough Board of Education. His close friend and vice-principal William A. Porter became principal, until his death in 1956. With this changing of the guard came the change of the school's official name: R. H. King Collegiate Institute.

The new era in education saw growth all over Scarborough. Over the years, the growing post-war population necessitated many additions and improvements to the original building which in turn led to several schools erected surrounding it under his watch – Winston Churchill Collegiate Institute (1954), W. A. Porter Collegiate Institute (1958), David and Mary Thomson Collegiate Institute (1959) and Cedarbrae Secondary School (1961) – although his successor Anson S. Taylor continue to see the schools nearby established: Midland Avenue Secondary School (1962), Birchmount Park Collegiate Institute (1964) and Sir Wilfrid Laurier Collegiate Institute (1965) along with two vocational schools (Bendale Secondary School in 1963 and Tabor Park Vocational School in 1965). Some staff and students of the old S.C.I. transferred to these new sites of higher learning. This breathing space for R. H. King C.I. allowed the rebirth of some clubs and activities that had been postponed due to "double shifting".

The school expanded westward with the new addition that adds ten classrooms, a double gymnasium, and the modern entrance, which was completed by the start of the 1961–62 school year. This addition was designed by architects Allward and Gouinlock.

By then, the Scarborough Board announced R.H. King Collegiate's replacement of its outdated structures dated to 1922 due to fire hazards in the ceilings and floors for its $5.7 million replacement 1900 pupil campus. King was second behind Weston Collegiate Institute in the adolescence list because the vocational art course were offered for 400 students due to pressures at Cedarbrae and Thomson Collegiates. While the 1952 additions and the archway remain, the majority of the original 1922 structure was demolished in spring 1976, replaced by a modern structure with newer academic and science classrooms, library, swimming pool, offices, and cafetorium. Phase two of the construction remodelled the entire 1950s eastern wing.

In 1972, R. H. King C. I. celebrated its 50th anniversary.

=== R. H. King Academy (1989–present) ===
Beginning in the 1989–90 school year, the school was given academy status by the Scarborough Board of Education, thus rebranding itself as R.H. King Academy because of its possible threatening closure due to declining enrollment. The school was also given partial "special status" as an alternative school, meaning the school was not deemed automatically as a home-school for students residing nearby. "In area" students were granted the first available spaces, but could opt to go to one of the other nearby high schools if the "Academy" system was not what they wanted. Additional spaces were available after this first group of in area students were registered. These spaces would go to students from "out of area". There were no specific "academic" requirements for admission to King, but students and their parents did need to agree to abide by the Academy's uniform and other policies. The uniform was mandated for all students up until the 2021–2022 school year.

During the first 4 or 5 years of the Academy, there were "line-ups" for "out of area" registration. Parents would even come the day before to get a spot in line. These line-ups became a marketing problem for the board of education, so a more equitable system where students were selected through a lottery-system was established.

King has won three Canada Awards for Excellence from the National Quality Institute.

In 2005, King implemented a new Leadership Pathway program in which students applying for first year can opt to apply for Leadership Pathway admission. Program admission requirements are applicable and enrollment in the program requires students to complete more tasks, such as an additional 25 hours of Ontario Community Involvement hours and taking an active part in at least 2 leadership councils each year. The first group of students who entered the program graduated in 2009.

Following the conclusion of the 2012–13 school year, King turned the Heritage Room, a university-style lecture room that was the school's library from the 1952 construction, into the Tommy Jutcovich Heritage Room. It was named after the school's long standing principal, Thomas Jutcovich, who left the school after a tenure which saw the school rise to one of the top public schools in Toronto.

R. H. King Academy celebrated its 100th anniversary on September 22–25, 2022.

== Student life ==
Arts

King provides opportunities for students to participate in visual arts, dance, photography, arts management, communications, technology, drama, fashion, media, improv, music (voice, band, strings, guitar), musical theatre, presentation skills, technical theatre production, technological design, video production and writers' craft. R.H. King provides a Leadership: Arts and Culture stream where students have 4 years of arts-based classes.

Athletics

The school provides opportunities for students to participate in volleyball, basketball, hockey, flag football, cricket, field hockey, curling, lacrosse, golf, cross country, rugby, soccer, swimming, ultimate frisbee, slo-pitch, badminton and track and field.

Leadership

This school provides two different streams for leadership alongside their regular stream.

- Leadership: Future Leaders
- Leadership: Arts and Culture

== Notable alumni ==
- Bobby Baun - NHL player
- Andy Donato – political cartoonist
- Peter Douris – NHL player
- Brett Callighen – NHL player
- Robbie Robertson – The Band

== Arms ==
Coat of arms of R. H. King Academy

Notes
Granted January 15, 2002.
Crest
Issuant from a circlet Or the upper rim set with hazelnuts alternating with trillium flowers Proper a demi lion Or holding between its paws a mortarboard cap Azure.
Escutcheon
Azure the entrance portal of the former Scarborough High School Argent.
Supporters
On a representation of the Scarborough Bluffs proper rising from barry wavy Argent and Azure two lions rampant Or each gorged with a collar compony Azure Sable and Vert and grasping a torch Sable enflamed Or.
Motto
Diligimus Quaerimus Servimus

== See also ==
- Education in Ontario
- List of secondary schools in Ontario
