= Winston Churchill Collegiate Institute =

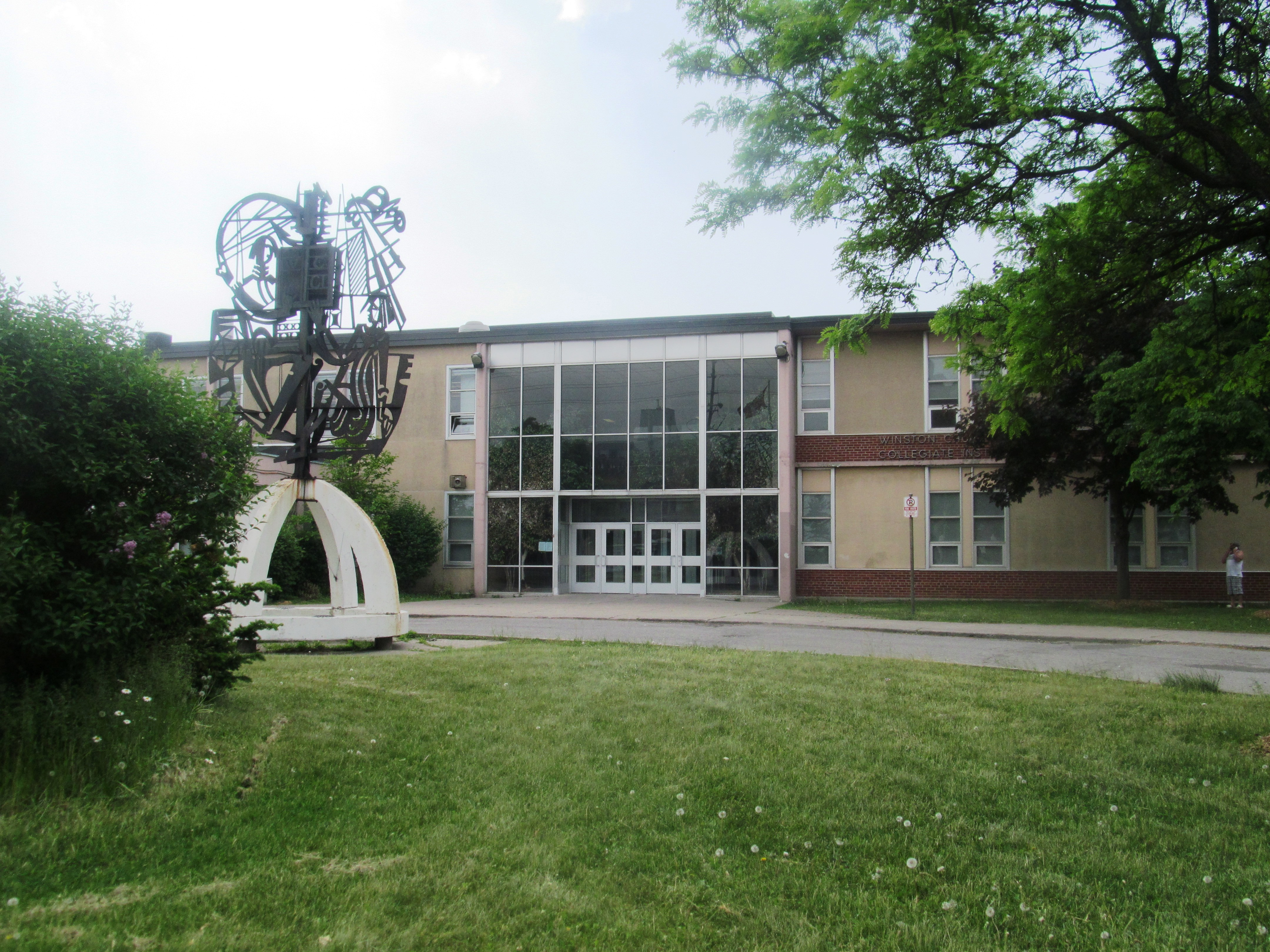
- The front entrance of Winston Churchill C.I.

Location
- 2239 Lawrence Avenue East; Toronto, Ontario, M1P 2P1; Canada; 43°44′54″N 79°16′42″W

Information
- School type: Public, High school
- Motto: Fides, Virtus, Doctrina (Faith, Excellence, Knowledge)
- Founded: September 7, 1954; 72 years ago
- Status: Active
- School board: Toronto District School Board (Scarborough Board of Education)
- Superintendent: Jaqueline Spence LC3, Executive
- Area trustee: Neethan Shan Ward 17
- School number: 4196 / 954039
- Principal: Nicole Aloise
- Grades: 9-12
- Enrolment: 644 (2023- 2024)
- Language: English
- Campus size: 15 acres (6.1 ha)
- Colours: Purple, Black, Grey, White, Scarlet, Silver
- Slogan: Your Community Place for Learning
- Mascot: Bulldogs
- Team name: Churchill Bulldogs
- Feeder schools: Dorset Park Public School; Ellesmere-Statton Public School; General Crerar Public School; Ionview Public School; Robert Service Sr. Public School
- Website: www.winstonchurchillci.ca

Winston Churchill Collegiate Institute is a public high school in Toronto, Ontario, Canada. Located in the Dorset Park neighbourhood of Scarborough, it is owned and operated by the Toronto District School Board (and the former Scarborough Board of Education prior to merger.) The school was named after Winston Churchill, the prime minister of the United Kingdom from 1940 to 1945 and 1951 to 1955.

Although the language of instruction is English, 59 percent of the students do not use English as their primary language, and 26 percent have resided in Canada less than five years. In spring 2007, there were 554 male students and 467 female students. Since then, the enrolment sits below 1000 with 644 students. The motto for Winston Churchill is Fides, Virtus, Doctrina which means "Faith, Excellence, Knowledge".

== History ==
In the years after World War II, several areas formed new subdivisions and homes developed from farmlands. The Scarborough Collegiate Institute Board needed a high school in the central Scarborough area as two older secondary schools, Scarborough Collegiate Institute to the south and Agincourt Collegiate Institute to the north were filled to capacity.

As a result, on December 4, 1953, the datestone for Winston Churchill Collegiate Institute was set in place by the SCIB. The Collegiate Board later formed the Scarborough Board of Education in January 1954. While the school was named after the British Prime Minister during the Second World War, Sir Winston Churchill, the school's name does not have a Sir; it is simply Winston Churchill C.I.

The school building was designed by an architectural firm, Carter, Coleman and Rankin Associates and the building completed during the eight-month span. Churchill opened to its first 690 students on September 7, 1954, as the third high school in Scarborough under the founding principal, A. B. Alison. Initially, the facilities began with 20 classrooms, library, cafeteria, main office, and the gymnatorium. Today, Churchill now has a capacity to hold 1,353 pupils.

== Crest ==
The crest for Winston Churchill Collegiate depicts an upper arrow shield with a maple leaf, open look and lamp of learning with two winged seahorses as supporters. On top of the crest, the inscription reads "Winston Churchill" with the letters "C" and "I" in between the shield with the motto "Fides, Virtus, Doctrina" (Faith, Excellence, Knowledge) inscribed on the bottom.

== Overview ==
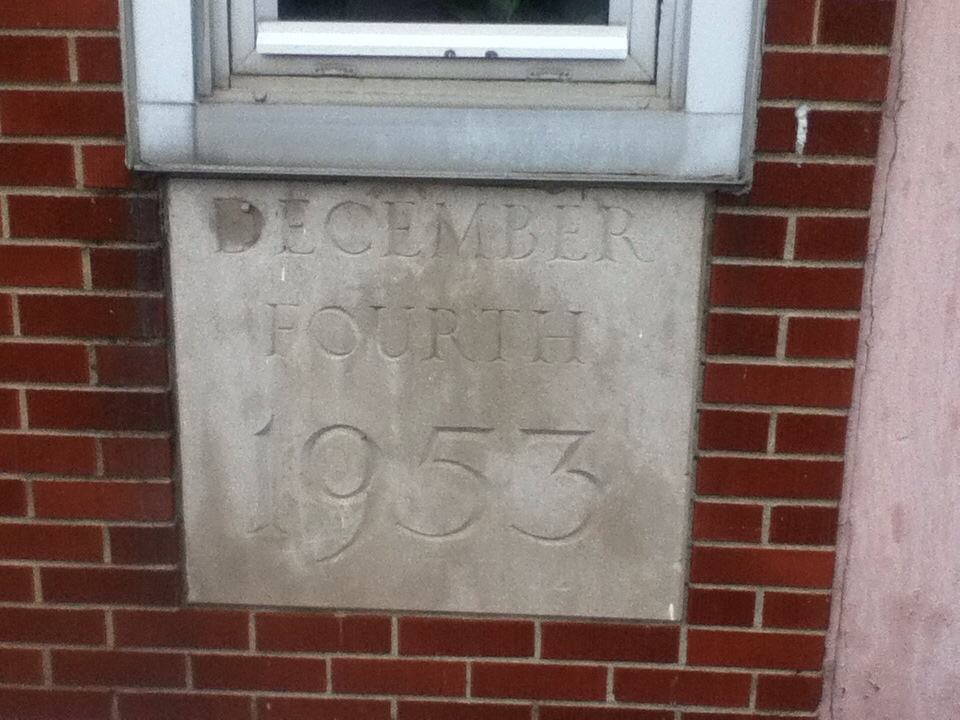
The datestone "December 4, 1953" was erected.

Churchill is host to many special events such as the Churchill Cheer, a December event where money is raised for charities, and the Cultural Connections Week. The school has a lot of extra curricular activities and participates with the TDSB night school program (for two years, from 2013 to 2015, it had been split with Birchmount Park Collegiate and SCAS Midland). The school also has hands-on and computer courses such as Auto Shop, Wood Shop, Electronics, Machine Shop, Computer Electronics, Computer Technology, Computer Science, Computer Engineering, etc.

Winston Churchill Collegiate, as of 2013, is one of TDSB's flagship Adult ESL Assessment Centres in the east end, replacing nearby Highbrook.

Since the closure of Midland Avenue Collegiate Institute in 2000, the school's attendance boundary is now assigned to portions of south of Eglinton Avenue and east of the railway line.

=== Campus ===
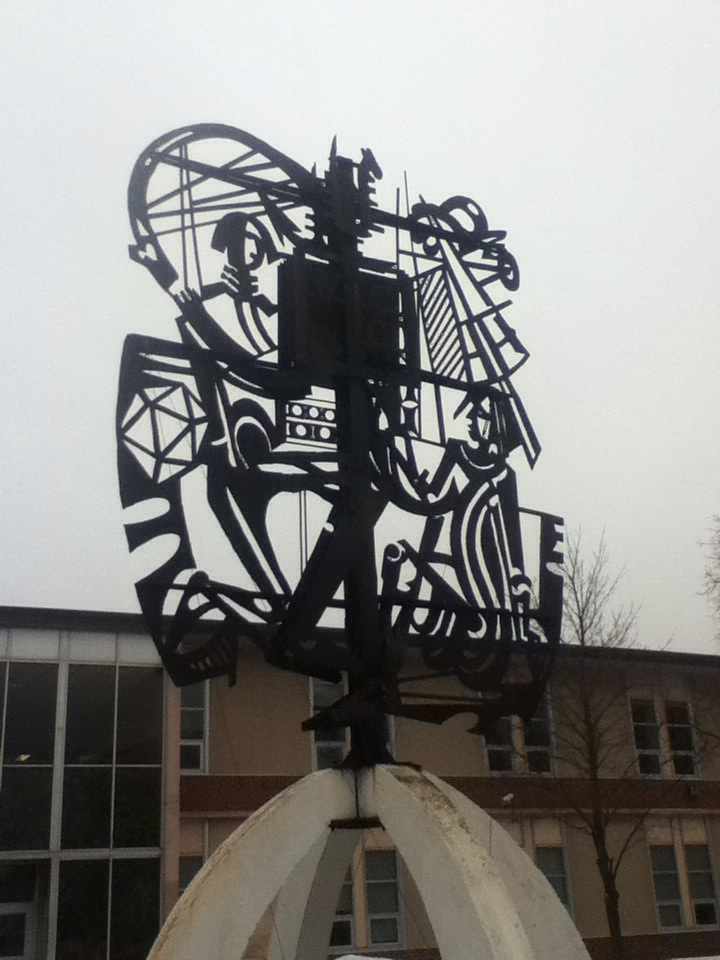
The sculpture in front of the school

Winston Churchill shares the same design as West Hill Collegiate Institute and has since altered over time. Located in the 15-acre (6.1 ha) campus in the three-storey, 202,216 sq ft (18,786.5 m^{2}) building, it started with 23 classrooms and has undergone major constructions and renovations in 1955, 1961, 1963, 1964, 1966, 1973 and 1983 that currently composes of more than 75+ classrooms for science and academics, four gymnasiums (girls in the upper, boys in the lower - both can be divided into smaller sections), a cafeteria, a library, workshop rooms (wood shop and auto shop) located in the eastern corner, a quad to enable creative learning opportunities for studies in science, the main office/guidance in the northeastern corner, the larger 904-seat auditorium, and the paved race track with the football/soccer field. There are 12 fire exits.

The auditorium, located at the southwestern corner of the school, was originally constructed in 1962 to accommodate the partially completed swimming pool but it was converted into an auditorium the last minute after the stage and seats were installed instead, although the plumbing systems remained attached.

The building is divided into three floors with the basement in the western corner, the main floor, and the upper floor in the north corner with each wing has block A, B, C, D, and E. Lockers are colored purple, grey, lime green, orange and teal. The main floor is easily accessible because Winston Churchill is one of the TDSB/SBE facilities not to have elevator access.

=== Leonard Braithwaite Program ===
The Leonard Braithwaite Program is an Africentric alternative program offered at Churchill targeting students regardless of race since the 2012–2013 academic year. It is the first Africentric program in the TDSB Secondary level and the first high school in Canada to receive one. Oakwood Collegiate Institute was originally to offer the program but it did not materialized due to outcry of protests. The program was named after an Ontario MPP, Leonard Braithwaite.

=== Sports and clubs ===
Winston Churchill C.I. has a wide variety of sports and clubs. Student Activities Council, Churchill Bull Dog Council (CBC) are among the student clubs. There are also many sports teams at Churchill such as basketball, soccer, flag football, ice hockey, baseball, ultimate frisbee, rugby, cricket, volleyball, badminton, and many others. After many years a football program has been reintroduced, with Churchill teaming up with Bendale BTI.

=== Colours and mascot ===
The school colours were originally scarlet and silver, as an ode to the coat of arms of Winston Churchill, they have since been changed to black, white, grey and purple after a deal with the Western Ontario Mustangs team. The Churchill mascot is the Winston Churchill Bull Dog. The school has a big painting of a bull dog in the school's upper gym .

== Notable alumni ==
- Dwayne De Rosario - Soccer player for Toronto FC and MLS MVP Award winner
- Bob McCown - Prime Time Sports host, CJCL-AM (Sportsnet 590 The Fan)
- Rick Middleton - Former NHLer for the New York Rangers and Boston Bruins
- Scott Morrison - Sportsnet and Hockey Night in Canada journalist
- Fred Patterson - Humble and Fred co-host, 102.1 The Edge
- Genevieve Westcott - Journalist in Russia

== See also ==
- Education in Ontario
- List of secondary schools in Ontario
