= Midland Avenue Collegiate Institute =

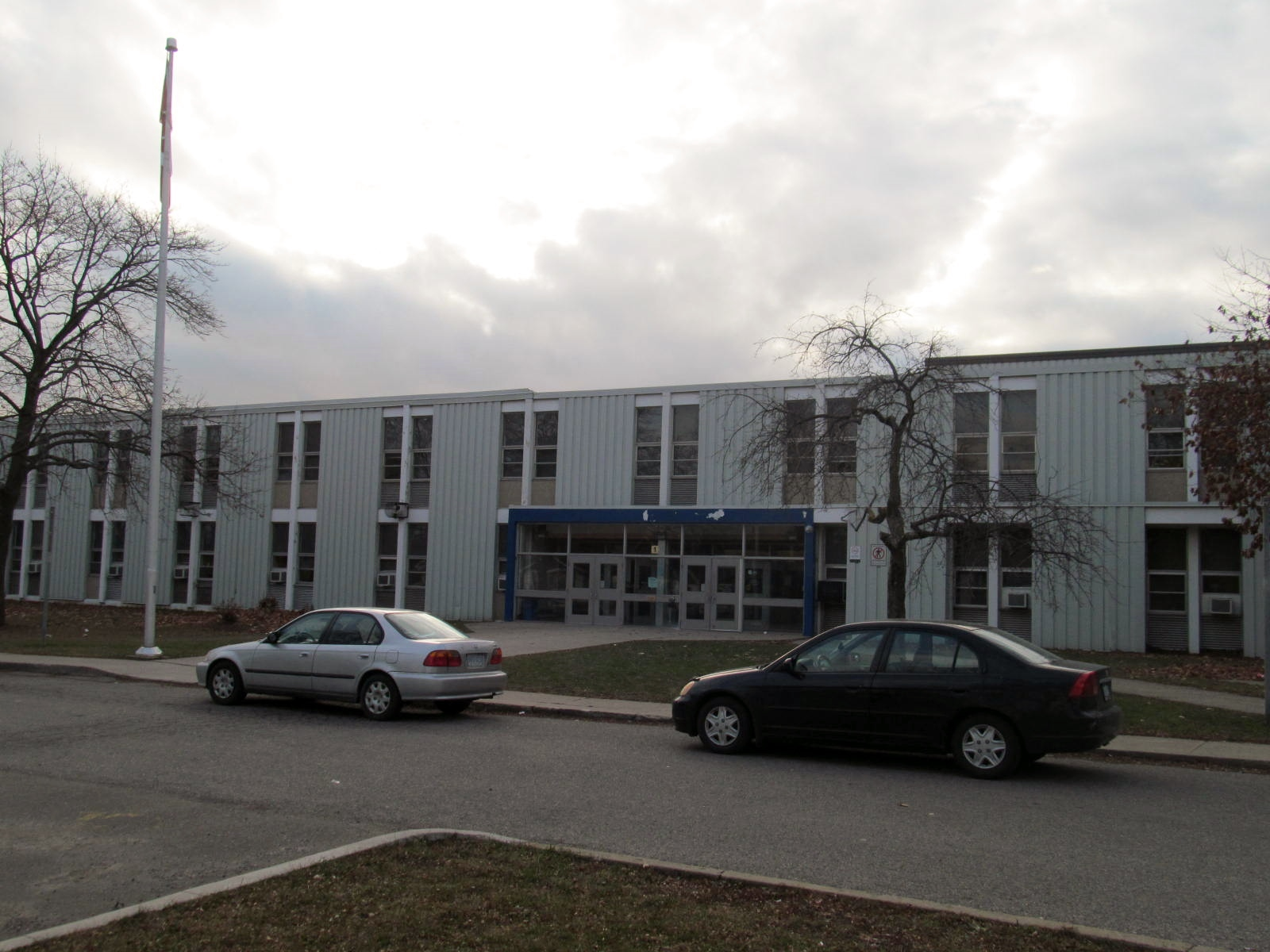
- Midland Avenue Collegiate Institute, constructed in 1961, seen in 2014.

Location
- 720 Midland Avenue; Toronto, Ontario, M1K 4C9; Canada; 43.728364°N 79.25549°W

Information
- Former name: Midland Avenue Secondary School (1962–1965)
- School type: Public High School
- Motto: Semper Ad Optimum (Always Striving for the Best)
- Religious affiliation: Secular
- Founded: September 4, 1962; 63 years ago
- Status: Active / Partially leased out
- Closed: June 30, 2000; 26 years ago
- School board: Toronto District School Board (Scarborough Board of Education)
- Oversight: Toronto Lands Corporation
- School number: 926213
- Principal: See below
- Grades: 9-13
- Enrolment: 608 (1999–2000)
- Language: English
- Campus size: 13 acres
- Colours: Green and Gold
- Team name: Midland Mustangs; Midland Marauders
- Website: web.archive.org/web/19981205113401/http://www.interlog.com:80/~scarboro/direct/midland/home.htm

Midland Avenue Collegiate Institute (also known as Midland Avenue CI, MA, MACI, Midland CI, or Midland), formerly Midland Avenue Secondary School and initially known as Central Collegiate Institute is a Toronto District School Board-owned alternative learning complex in Toronto, Ontario, Canada. Located in the former suburb of Scarborough, it consists of Scarborough Centre for Alternative Studies (SCAS), South East Year Round Alternative Centre (SEYRAC), and Caring and Safe Schools Midland program.

This three-storey public high school opened in 1962 for the Scarborough Board of Education until its closure in 2000 due to low enrolment. Throughout its existence, Midland's academic and athletic programs were flexible, relevant, and student-centred with courses designed to include various instructional techniques catering to its diverse population. Its facilities include a greater auditorium, swimming pool, rounded cafeteria and larger technical shops.

Midland's motto is Semper ad Optimum which translates to "Always strive for the best".

== History ==
Originally named Central Collegiate Institute, the school buried a time capsule was buried at that time. The history began when the Scarborough Board of Education acquired 13 acres of the Central C.I. school behind the railway line for $266,200. The school, then renamed to Midland Avenue Secondary School, was then designed by an architectural firm Craig, Madill, Abram and Ingleson.

Midland S.S. was constructed in 1961 and opened its doors on September 4, 1962 under its first principal James Hamilton as Scarborough's eighth collegiate and the first composite secondary school. Aside from Cedarbrae Secondary School as the first trade-academic institution, Midland Avenue Secondary opened for students in the area who attended many secondary schools surrounding it such as King, Churchill, Porter and Thomson Collegiates. The school was officially opened on December 11, 1962.

By 1965, Midland Avenue Secondary was itself renamed to Midland Avenue Collegiate Institute. The school's original facilities consisted of 30 standard classrooms, art, music, 5 science lab., library, 2 industrial arts, 2 home economics, 3 typing rooms, a 918-seated auditorium, 3 gymnasiums, cafeteria and business machines room. The sections of the original building such as the commercial and technical wing was erected in 1963, followed by the addition of 11 classrooms along with the swimming pool built in 1964 and the library in 1974.

=== Decline ===
During the 1980s, Midland experienced declining enrolment due to demographic changes in the Toronto area. The school body had also undergone a demographic shift from an influx of new immigration to the nearby area since the early 1990s. This was accompanied and complicated by a drop in attendance from students who lived in the area, who starting in the mid-1980s chose to go other schools in the area

In 1988, Midland was risking closure as hundreds of students, parents and teachers jammed the meeting in protest. Trustees were scrambling to find a place to put Scarborough Centre for Alternative Studies to that location (see below) SBE has decided to transfer the adult school because it didn't want to part with an ordinary high school due to nearby Tabor Park Vocational School (which is a 2-minute drive) was handed over to the Metropolitan Separate School Board (now the Toronto Catholic District School Board) by July 1989. The reason given was that enrolment at Midland was declining as projections up to 1996 showed that about 740 students attended the school.

Several incidents happened at Midland such as two female students accused a group of boys of molesting and threatening them in 1990. Meanwhile, in April or May 1994, a student tipped the school administration to a hidden cache of knives and high-powered ammunition and stated that there was a fight planned. Police seized more than 59 ammunition rounds and a kitchen knife and an army combat knife. Two teenagers were placed under arrest.

The province defunded the adult day school at Midland Avenue in 1999, causing it to stop operating. The time capsule was opened by Nadine Segal, the principal, in 2000.

=== Closure ===
When Scarborough became a part of Toronto in 1998, the Scarborough Board of Education became part of the new, but one of the largest boards on the continent, the Toronto District School Board. Changes in the new funding structure caused the creation of a short-list of 138 schools in Toronto proposed to be closed. The list was a reaction to a creation of a funding formula based on students per square footage of the school, which prompted debate over the issue rather than the actual closure of the schools. Since the physical building was large with a good state of repair, and the population was smaller, it was placed high on the list. This ultimately became justification for closing the school. The closing can be ultimately summed up due to a School Trustee who did not support the teachers and residents' wishes, a lack of civic participation, and a lack of knowledge and participation of new immigrants.

According to principal Nadine Seagal, the TDSB argued that since Midland Avenue was under-utilized, with only 650 students in the 216,521-square-foot (20,115.5 m^{2}) campus that can hold up to 1,358 students, it should be closed. Staff and students advocated for the school to remain open.

As an ultimate consequence, the school was permanently closed at the end of June 2000. The Toronto Catholic District School Board, meanwhile, attempted to consolidate Jean Vanier Catholic Secondary School (at the former Tabor Park grounds) and Blessed Cardinal Newman Catholic High School (at the St. Augustine's Seminary site) at Midland, but it was never materialized.

The Midland Avenue C.I. attendance area was then reassigned to David and Mary Thomson Collegiate Institute, R. H. King Academy, Winston Churchill Collegiate Institute, W. A. Porter Collegiate Institute and Birchmount Park Collegiate Institute.

=== Since 2000 ===
Following the closure, in 2001, Midland operated for quite a number of years as the Bond Education Group, a private school leasing the facility from the Toronto District School Board. While public tax dollars goes to education and upkeep of local schools, the public is generally unaware and not usually kept informed of what happens to public properties like school buildings, once a school is closed. While many might have thought the building was outright sold, it seems as if it was just leased to the Bond Education Group, possibly a ten-year lease. By the end of June 2010, Bond was relocated at 1500 Birchmount Rd.

The Toronto District School Board reoccupied parts of building beginning in 2005, establishing South East Year Round Alternative Centre and Safe and Caring Schools Program Area C in the process with the Staff Development in the basement (later moved to Thomson Collegiate). In September 2010, the TDSB relocated Scarborough Centre for Alternative Studies, from its location at Centennial College to the building as Centennial expanded the teaching space by acquiring the latter site and Midland was originally to be the site of the new SCAS just more than 20 years prior. As of 2013, Midland currently leases the parts of the building to Not Your Average Day Care and, since 2001, Olympia Swimming on the northwestern side of the building.

== Overview ==
=== Layout ===
Midland Avenue CI is a larger 225,191 sq. ft. facility built in a 13.2-acre land and typical of high schools built in the baby boom generation of the 1950s and 1960s. It included many modernist design features including five stairwells, a circular cafeteria that looked onto Midland Avenue, a two floor library with two seminar rooms, wide guidance area, larger atrium, and a larger auditorium with more than 928 seats in which this school boasted as one of the acoustic auditoriums in Ontario. Other features included 33 academic classrooms, four drafting rooms, two home economics rooms, one large lecture hall, four performing art rooms for music/dance/drama, two visual art rooms, five science labs, three gymnasia with the larger one that can be partitioned into two smaller gyms, swimming pool, and several tech programs consisting of hairstyling room, large multi-car automobile repair hangar/repair and carpentry/construction shops with four garage doors that most schools did not have. It also has the large athletic field as well the track and football/soccer fields with an attached hill. Portables were placed on that site for the surplus needs of students.

The school is built in a hill-like structure with three floors such as the first floor and its halls shaped as a "C", the second/main floor, and the third floor also has its hallways T-shaped. The lockers were originally painted green and gold (save for the orange, beige, and olive green colors in the tech wing) but has since been repainted to shades of blue (ground floor), green (main floor) and teal (top floor).

=== Academics ===
Midland offered many academic resource opportunities for assistance and enrichment along with its ESL, co-op and transitional credit programs, leadership opportunities for all students, a strong music, visual arts and drama department and their excellent facilities to provide a broad based technology program. The school previously operated under the OS:IS curriculum before the OSS was issued in 1999.

During its last years, the school's grade 9 program was non-semestered to allow for consolidation of basic skills. Midland Avenue had its SHSM in cosmetology.

=== Co-curricular Activities ===
The school offered many clubs and activities such as Student Administrative Council, MARS, Math League, Prefects, the Midland Avenue Athletic Council (MAAC), Peer Tutors, Band, Choir, and Drama Club.

Midland was the first collegiate in Scarborough to have cricket in the 1960s. It then participated in the SSAAA and TDSSAA in basketball, baseball, softball, football, ice hockey, wrestling, track and field, cross country, gymnastics, soccer, and other sports.

== Principals ==
- G. W. Barrett
- James Hamilton
- Jay Watt
- James Wade
- Stella H. Dasko
- Nadine Segal
- Marie Vincent

== Notable alumni ==
- David C. Onley, former Lieutenant Governor of Ontario and lecturer at University of Toronto
- Bill Hastings, former Chief Censor of New Zealand, Chief Justice of Kiribati
- John Child - volleyball player

== See also ==
- List of high schools in Ontario
- Scarborough Centre for Alternative Studies
