= Birch Cliff =

- Neighbourhood
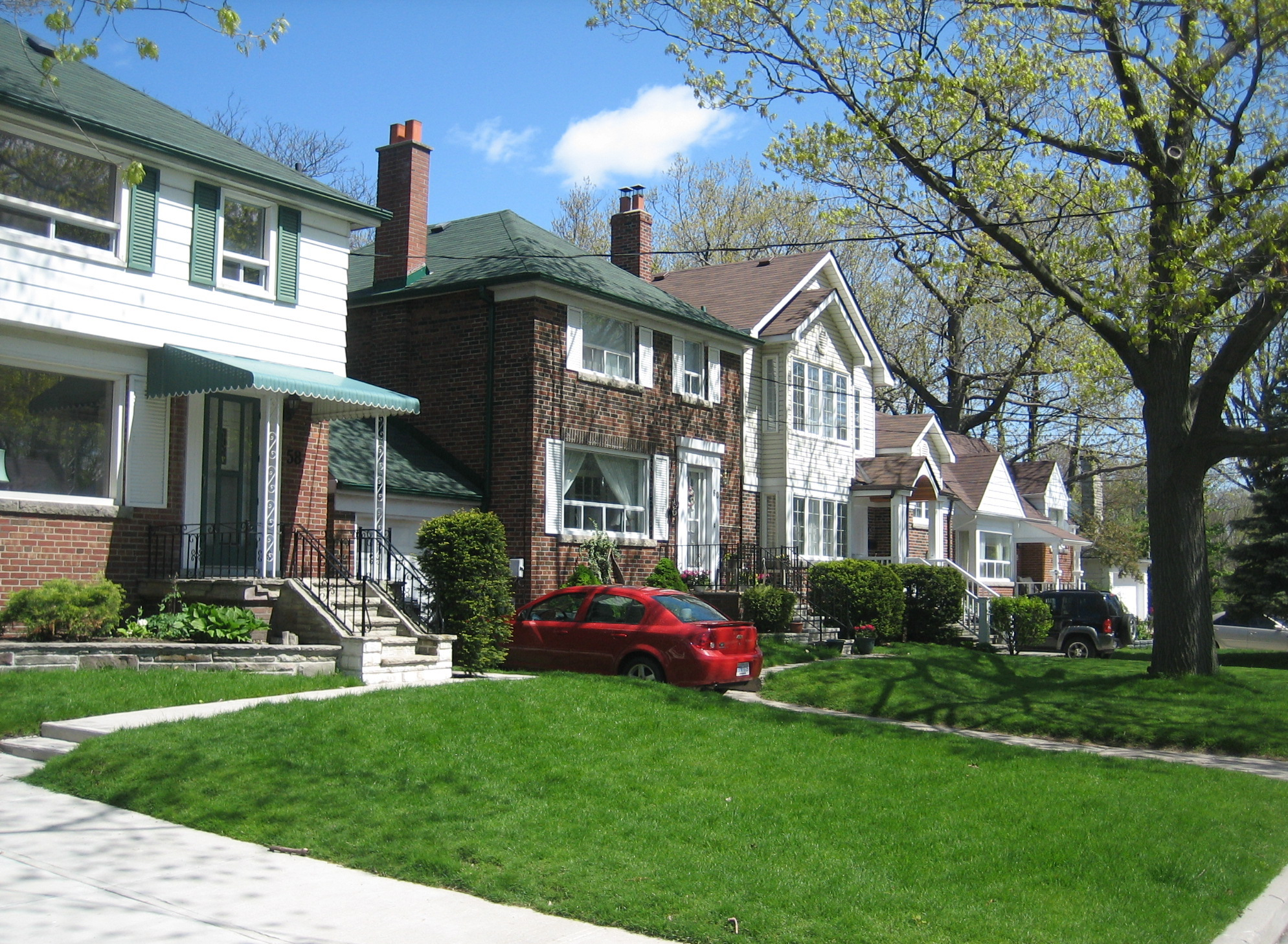
- A group of houses in the Birch Cliff neighbourhood

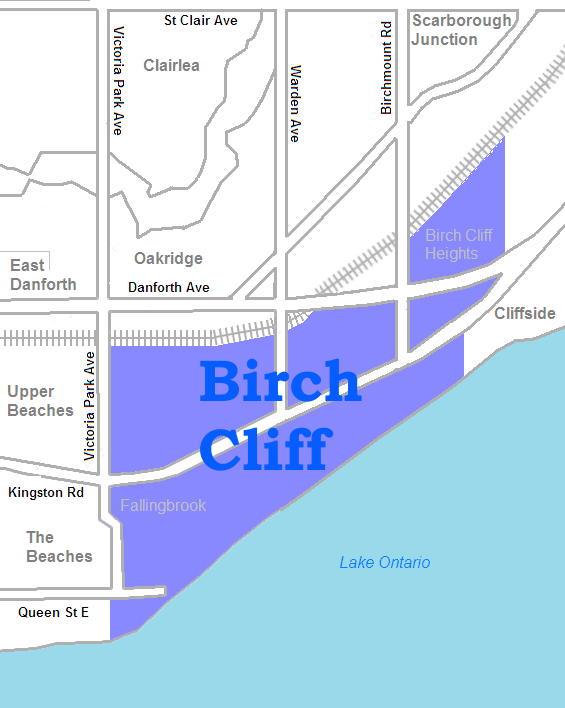
- Vicinity

- Location within Toronto
- Coordinates: 43°41′15″N 79°16′10″W
- Country: Canada
- Province: Ontario
- City: Toronto
- Established municipality: 1850 Scarborough Township
- Changed municipality: 1998 Toronto from Scarborough

Government
  - MP: Bill Blair (Scarborough Southwest)
  - MPP: Doly Begum (Scarborough Southwest)
  - Councillor: Vacant (Ward 20 Scarborough Southwest)

Birch Cliff is a neighbourhood in Toronto, Ontario, Canada. It is located in the eastern part of the city, part of the district of Scarborough running along the shore of Lake Ontario atop the western part of the Scarborough Bluffs. About one-third of Birch Cliff residents are of Irish origin.

The area was first developed as the home of the Toronto Hunt Club in 1895 when the region was still mostly farms and woodland. Around the club, a number of cottages were erected and one of these was named "Birch Cliff." The Victorian dwelling (believed to exist today but significantly altered) was built on Springbank Avenue for John Stark, who named it after the birch trees along the edge of the nearby Scarborough Bluffs. This name was also adopted by the local post office, and became the name for the neighbourhood.

The area can also be broken down to two smaller areas west of Warden Avenue to Victoria Park Avenue:

- Blantyre located north of Kingston Road and east of Victoria Park Avenue to west of Warden Avenue
- Fallingbrook located south of Kingston Road and east of Victoria Park Avenue to west of Warden Avenue

== History ==
As the Beaches neighbourhood was built to the west, the region became the first part of Scarborough to be developed as a suburb to the city of Toronto during the 1920s. Unlike the rest of Scarborough, which was developed after the Second World War as automotive based suburbs, Birch Cliff began as a streetcar suburb when the then Toronto and Scarboro' Electric Railway, Light and Power Company began operations on Kingston Road, transitioned in 1921 as TTC streetcar line running along Kingston Road to Birchmount Road. As the most populated part of the borough, Scarborough's municipal council met in a building on Kingston Road beginning in 1922. Kingston Road became a busy shopping district.

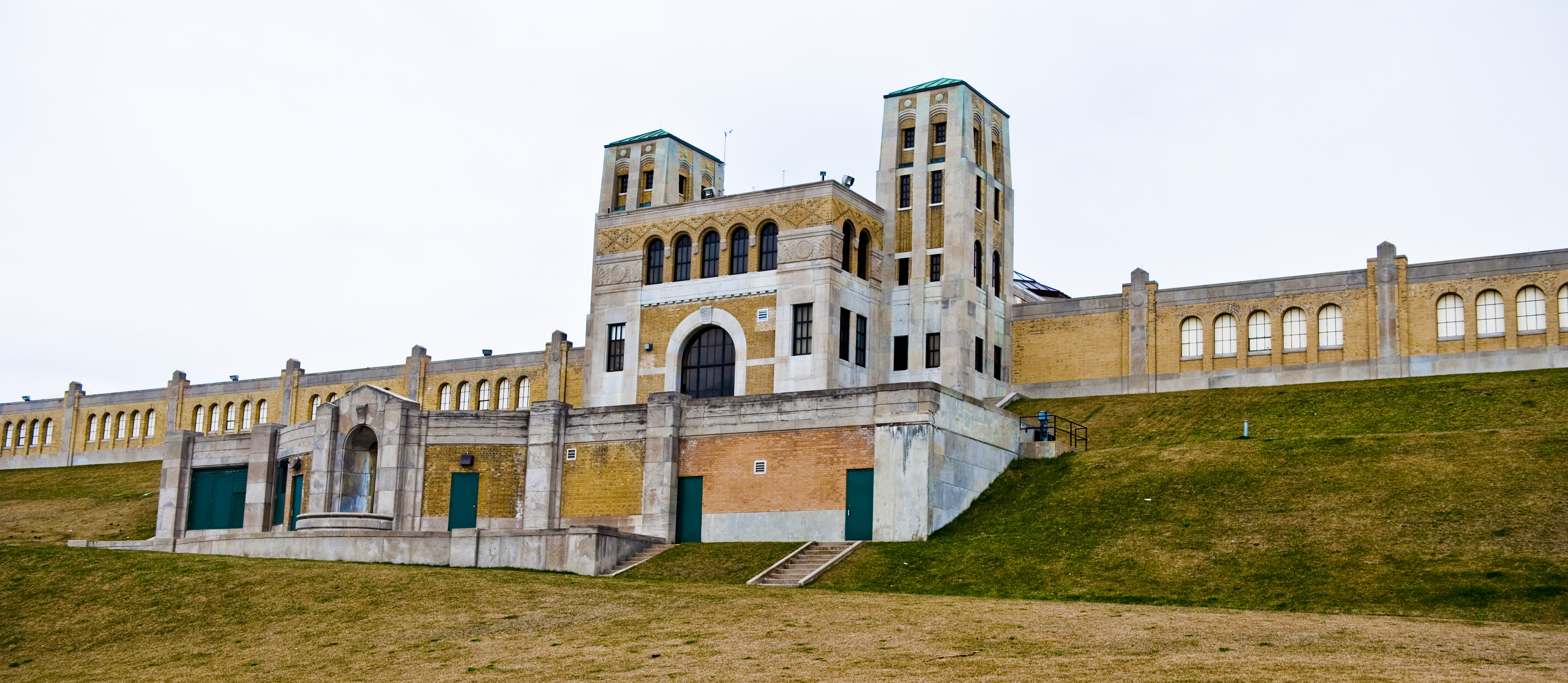
The R. C. Harris Water Treatment Plant was completed in Birch Cliff in 1941.

In 1932, construction of Toronto's R. C. Harris Water Treatment Plant began along Birch Cliff's waterfront. Completed in 1932, the water treatment plant was fashioned in an Art Deco style. The facility continues to function, and is operated by the City of Toronto government.

Streetcar service east of Victoria Park ended in 1954 and transitioned as suburban bus route but during the post-World War II boom Kingston Road become a major thoroughfare for those living further east in the newer suburbs. Most of the shops closed. The area by the lake and the ravines remained a wealthy residential district, while further north is a more middle class portion of Scarborough. This area further north is sometimes referred to as Birch Cliff Heights. The westernmost portion of the neighbourhood, west of the Hunt Club, is known as Fallingbrook. It is closely linked to the Beaches.

A notable section of the neighbourhood is the former Birch Cliff Quarry. This area is a former quarry that was first used as a quarry by the Toronto Brick Company. It covers a large area south of the railroad tracks, north of Gerrard, and east of Victoria Park. From 1954 to 1960 the old quarry was used as a landfill. In 1960, the landfill was shut down and the site was sold to a development company. At the time the Scarborough Expressway was planned to parallel the rail line, and the site would have thus been next to a major interchange. It was thus zoned for high density apartment buildings with 1,450 units. The plan was a tower in a park scheme similar to what was built to the north at Crescent Town. The expense of cleaning up the former landfill delayed the project, and in any case, civic activism stopped the Scarborough Expressway. Contemporary new urbanism as promoted by Jane Jacobs also firmly rejects such suburban tower plans, but the area retains the original zoning and under Ontario Municipal Board the city is not allowed to revoke such a zoning. As of November 6, 2012, the Ontario Municipal Board has approved the "tower in the park" style development, to the remorse of many living in the community.

== Education ==
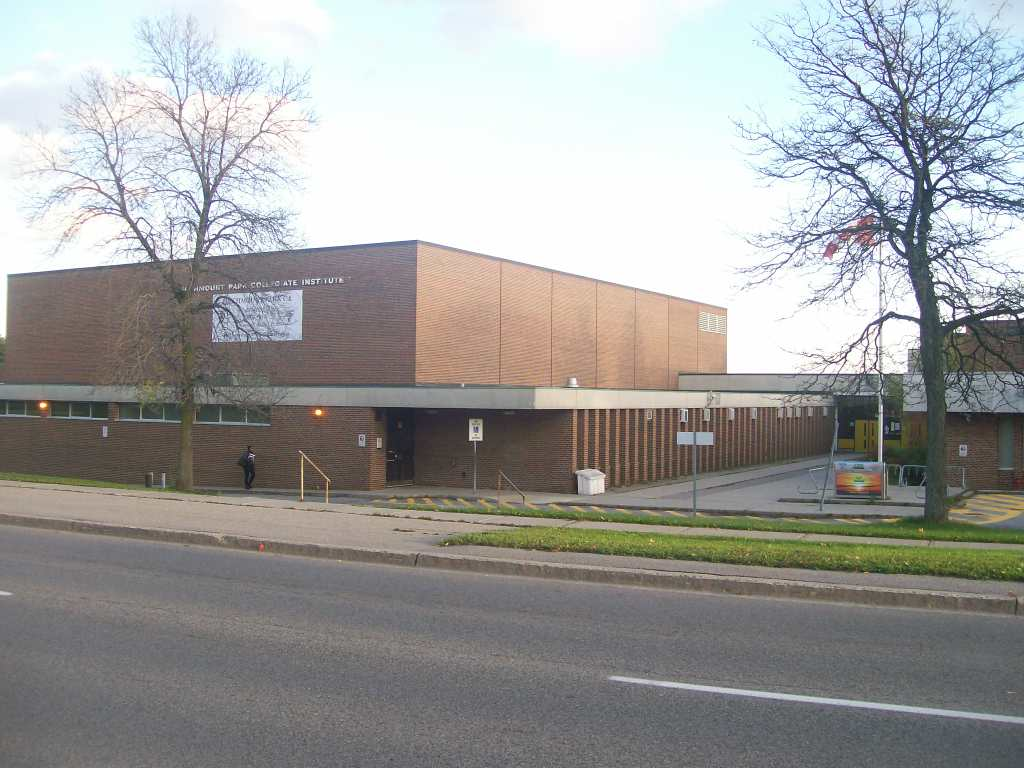
Birchmount Park Collegiate Institute is one of two public secondary school located in Birch Cliff.

Two public school boards operate schools in the neighbourhood.

The Toronto District School Board (TDSB) is a secular public school board, that operates one secondary school, Birchmount Park Collegiate Institute. In addition to secondary schools, TDSB also operates several elementary schools in Birch Cliff, including Birch Cliff Public School, Blantyre Public School, and Courcelette Public School.

The Toronto Catholic District School Board is a public separate school board that operates one elementary school in the neighbourhood, Immaculate Heart of Mary Catholic School, and one secondary school, Neil McNeil High School.

== Recreation ==
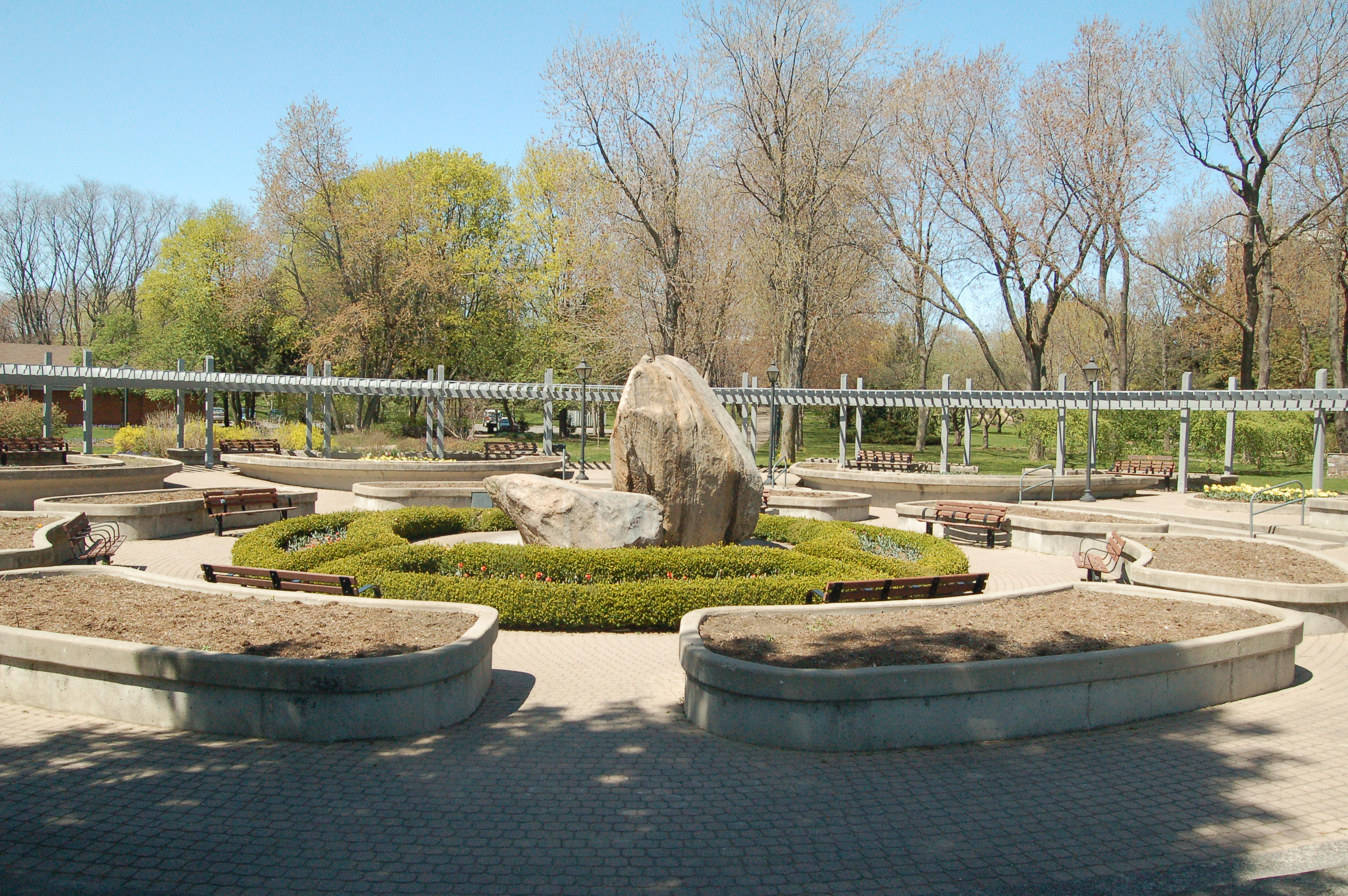
Water feature in Rosetta McClain Gardens, a municipal park in Birch Cliff.

The area is home to several municipal parks, including Birchmount Park, Crescentwood Park, Harrison Properties, and the Rosetta McClain Gardens. Parks in the neighbourhood are managed by the Toronto Parks, Forestry and Recreation Division. In addition to municipal parks, the city also owns Birchmount Stadium, a multi-purpose outdoor sports facility on Birchmount Road and Roy Halladay Field, a full sized baseball diamond located in Highview Park named after the former Toronto Blue Jays pitcher Roy Halladay. The Birch Cliff neighbourhood also features access to the Waterfront Trail at the bottom of Warden Avenue.
