= W. A. Porter Collegiate Institute =

Secondary school located in Scarborough, Toronto, Canada

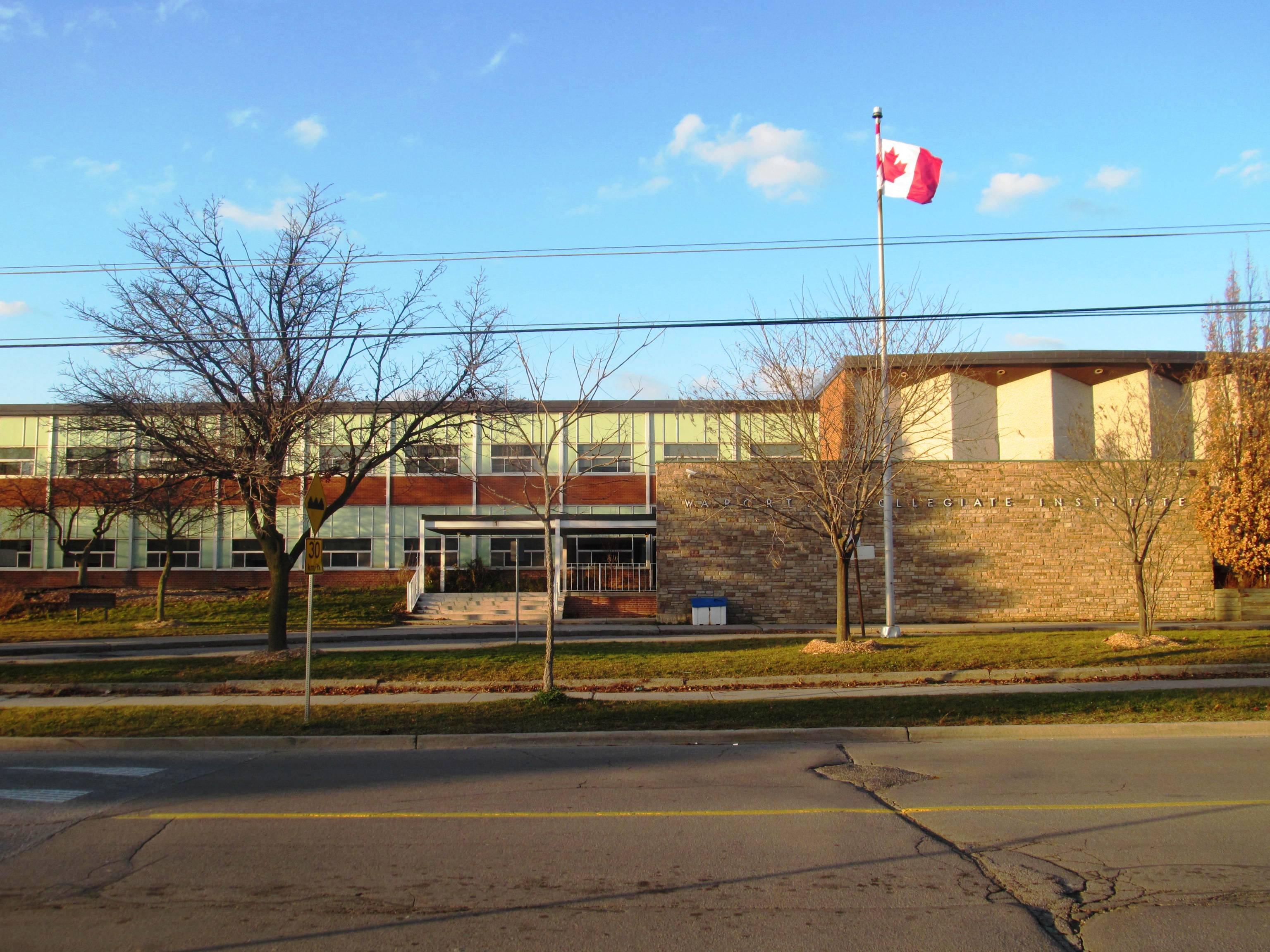
- The front of the school

Location
- 40 Fairfax Crescent; Toronto, Ontario, M1L 1Z9; Canada; 43°42′59″N 79°17′13″W

Information
- Other names: Scarborough Academy of Technological, Environmental and Computer Studies; SATEC @ W. A. Porter C.I.
- School type: Public high school
- Motto: Vincit qui se vincit (He conquers who conquers himself)
- Founded: 1958
- School board: Toronto District School Board (Scarborough Board of Education)
- Oversight: Toronto Lands Corporation
- Superintendent: Brendan Browne; LC3, Executive; Peter Chang; LN18
- Area trustee: Parthi Kandavel; Ward 18
- School number: 4178 / 949744
- Principal: Elizabeth Mayhew
- Grades: 9-12
- Enrolment: 1250 (2016/2017)
- Language: English
- Colours: Navy blue and light blue
- Mascot: Blue Eagle
- Team name: Porter Blue Eagles
- Feeder schools: Clairlea Public School; Danforth Gardens Public School; General Brock Public School; Regent Heights Public School
- Website: schoolweb.tdsb.on.ca/satec/
- Last updated: January 2021

W. A. Porter Collegiate Institute is a secondary school in Toronto, Ontario, Canada. It is located in the Clairlea neighbourhood of the former suburb of Scarborough. The school provides grades 9-12 as part of the Toronto District School Board. Until 1998, the school was part of the Scarborough Board of Education.

Founded in 1958, the school program combines academics with in-depth applications of technology, computer and environmental studies. Since 1997, the school is formally known as the Scarborough Academy of Technological, Environmental and Computer Studies (SATEC) at Porter. This school is an enriched science, technology, engineering and mathematics focused school; but also consistently ranked #1 in Toronto for Technological Studies, and within the top three for Math and Science. Porter's motto is Vincit qui se Vincit which means "He conquers who conquers himself".

== History ==
Located on 14.9 acres of land, W. A. Porter Collegiate Institute had its cornerstone laid and constructed in 1957 and opened for classes on September 9, 1958 to serve the south-west area of Scarborough as the city's fifth collegiate. The building was designed by the Toronto-based architectural firm Carter, Coleman and Rankin Associates.

The school's namesake, William Arnot Porter (1893-1956) began teaching in 1922 at Scarborough High School as a science teacher, specializing in the science of agriculture. He became the school's principal in 1954, and continued his lifelong work until his death in 1956. The school's founding principal was J. Ross Stevenson who served a year at Porter until he was transferred to the new David and Mary Thomson Collegiate Institute in 1959.

By 1961, the swimming pool was added. Additions were made in subsequent years.

With enrolment numbers dwindling, the SBE considered closing either Porter or Midland Avenue Collegiate Institute. However, instead, it was decided that at the start of the 1997–98 school year, W. A. Porter Collegiate was designated as the Scarborough Academy of Technological, Environmental and Computer Studies by the SBE, although the original name continues to exist. As of the 2000–01 academic year, Porter's attendance area was expanded after Midland closed that June. Since then, Porter's enrolment has rapidly increased.

The school celebrated its 50th anniversary in 2008, coinciding with the PEO Engineering Education Conference of the same year.

In 2010, Porter C.I. became a certified, platinum Eco-School of the TDSB.

Porter has a range of specialized programs like MST (Math and Science Technology), Cisco, High Skills Major, and many more. It celebrated its 60th anniversary in 2018.

Porter's feeder schools are Clairlea Public School, Danforth Gardens Public School, General Brock Public School and Regent Heights Public School

== Overview ==
Historically, admissions to SATEC @ Porter Collegiate are competitive and based on three factors: the entrance test, which is held each December, the student's Ontario grade 7 final report card, and the extra-curricular and leadership supplementary application. Along with this, applicants must bring a $10 fee and photo identification to the test. Students are ranked based on all three factors, and those at the top of the ranking are admitted first, whereas students who are not accepted may be placed on a waiting list if deemed necessary by school administration.

As of 2022, SATEC has switched to an essay-only system, as a requirement to enter their STEAM (Science, Technology, Engineering, Art, Mathematics) program. If an essay qualifies, a participant is entered into a lottery, where entrants are picked at random.

SATEC/Porter is regarded as a magnet school by the school board because of its strong technology program and its policies. It is a CISCO regional academy with certification in CISCO Networking and A+ Computer Service Technician Certification for the senior program. It has been named “Best For Technology” every year since 2006 among the secondary schools of Toronto. Along with R. H. King Academy, it is one of the few schools to have uniform policies and to accept students out of area.

The school offers two Specialist High Skills Major (SHSM) programs: ICT (Information and Communication Technology) and the Environment. In each program, students are required to complete a set number of courses, including a two-credit co-op course, along with obtaining industry standard certification. The first graduates from SATEC/Porter with the Specialist High Skills Major accreditation were the Class of 2011.

In January 2016, the TDSB released a list of schools which needed major repairs ranked by the province in "critical" condition. SATEC/Porter, built in 1956, was ranked 26th of 136 in the repair backlog list at 96.09%.

=== Athletics ===
In November 2012, the school hosted the reenactment of the 38th Grey Cup Mud Bowl that occurred on November 25, 1950 as part of a string of CFL festivities to commemorate the 100th Grey Cup. With generous support of corporate donors in Rona and the Toronto Argonauts, SATEC revamped its track field into a regulation-sized football stadium.

SATEC hosted its first-ever Friday night game on October 11, 2013 against David and Mary Thomson Collegiate Institute. Soon after, a selected group of players appeared on CP24 Breakfast with Nalini Sharma as Argos head coach Jim Barker demonstrated the fundamental runs and tackles of the sport.

== See also ==
- Education in Ontario
- List of secondary schools in Ontario
