= Bendale Business and Technical Institute =

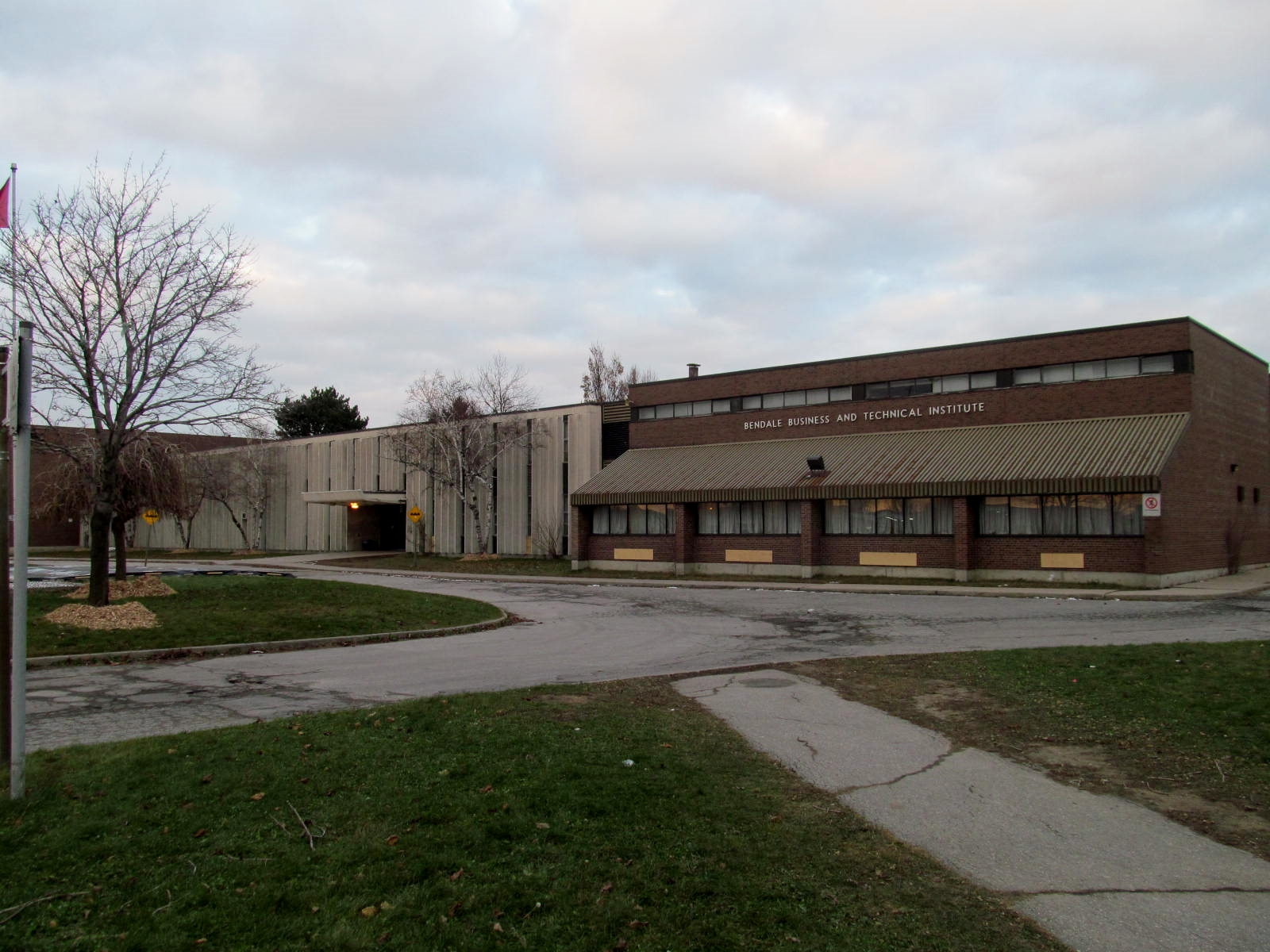
- The Bendale Business and Technical Institute building built in 1962, pictured in 2014.

Location
- 1555 Midland Avenue; Scarborough, Toronto, Ontario, M1P 3C1; Canada; 43°45′12″N 79°15′34″W

Information
- Former names: Bendale Vocational School (1963-1971); Bendale Secondary School (1971-1987)
- School type: Public, High school Vocational High school
- Motto: Flourish Through Industry
- Founded: 1963
- Status: Building demolished, eastern portion of the property retained
- Closed: 2019
- School board: Toronto District School Board (Scarborough Board of Education)
- Oversight: Toronto Lands Corporation
- Superintendent: Brendan Browne; LC3, Executive; Lynn Strangway; LN13
- Area trustee: David Smith; Ward 17
- School number: 4112 / 894621
- Administrator: Lorraine Stretch
- Principal: Edward Monkman (first); Colin Dye (last)
- Vice Principals: Annamaria Mazzaferro; Zoran Pejovic
- Grades: 9-13
- Enrollment: 403 (2016-17)
- Language: English
- Colours: Red and Gold
- Team name: Bendale Tigers
- Website: schoolweb.tdsb.on.ca/bendale/Home.aspx

Bendale Business and Technical Institute (Bendale BTI, BBTI, or Bendale), formerly Bendale Secondary School and Bendale Vocational School is a defunct specialized technical public high school that was located in Bendale, a neighbourhood in Scarborough, Ontario, Canada owned by the Scarborough Board of Education, that succeeded its operations into the present Toronto District School Board prior to merger. Existed from 1963 until its closure in 2019, it was the first vocational school that served in the former borough of Scarborough in which the school tailored for students with life skills or pursue career in the industry. The school's motto was Flourish Through Industry.

The school merged with David and Mary Thomson Collegiate Institute in 2019, after which it was demolished and the former race track replaced by the new school building. Bendale was located on the eastern corner of Midland Avenue north of Lawrence Avenue East.

== History ==
=== Origins ===
The history of Bendale Vocational School begins on November 7, 1961, when the Scarborough Board of Education approved a building application for the new $2,392,880.00 vocational school in Scarborough. At a February 13, 1962 school board meeting, the Scarborough Board of Education purchased a 13.319-acre site for a junior vocational school fronting Midland Avenue north of Lawrence Avenue East at a cost of $229,000. The school began construction that same year and opened on September 3, 1963, as its first occupational school. The building was designed by the architects Craig, Madill, Abram and Ingleson. At the cost of $2,392,880.00, it was built to accommodate 14 shops for boys, 9 shops for girls, 14 classrooms, 1 music room, cafetorium, a double gymnasium and library. Before the school existed, most of the technical courses were done at local collegiate institutes in Scarborough or Danforth Technical School and Jarvis Junior Vocational School in East Toronto.

From its inception, the school's programs were expanded from two years to four designed for students transferring from Grade 8 as first year pupils and failing students from regular collegiates. However, in 1965, the Scarborough Board of Education opened Tabor Park Vocational School and Bendale would later forge the model for special school delivery over the next 40 years with the openings of Sir Robert L. Borden Secondary School (1965) and Timothy Eaton Secondary School (1971). It then became Bendale Secondary School in 1971–72 school year.

The school's inaugural principal was Edward Monkman and its vice-principal was Jean McConnell. It had 21 teachers in its first year.

In 1987, Bendale S.S. celebrated its 25th anniversary and the school was renamed to Bendale Business and Technical Institute. On January 1, 1998, the SBE was dissolved and Bendale became part of the newly amalgamated Toronto District School Board.

=== Merger, closure and redevelopment ===
The Toronto District School Board passed staff's recommendation in February 2009 to consolidate Bendale with David and Mary Thomson Collegiate Institute on nearby Lawrence into one school that would be housed in a renovated Bendale. The recommendations were based on a report done by the accommodation review committee considering what should be done with Bendale, Thomson and Donwood Park Public School. The committee recommended a kindergarten to Grade 12 campus on the 38-acre property (that also includes Highbrook Learning Centre) with the surplus land to be sold to pay for the new school. Based on costs consideration, staff recommended the board renovate Donwood and change it from a kindergarten to Grade 6 to a K-8 school, while a deep retrofit be undertaken at Bendale.

Toronto Lands Corporation, the realtor arm of the TDSB, declared 7.6 acres of Bendale BTI surplus in June 2012. With the school planned to be demolished upon completion of the new building in late 2019, the proposed 140 townhouse subdivision are to be built on the Bendale site along with the extension of Brockley Road to Midland Avenue.

The proposal was condemned by the local community, particularly over the loss of green space and over residents' impressions that they were told the Thomson site would be used for a school and that they were initially promised an urban farm. Per regulation 444/98, other public agencies should be given the right to make an offer before the property is placed on the open market. Midland Park Community Association, a residents' group in Scarborough, and the Greater Bendale Advocacy Team (GBAT), formed by Mark Weiser, protested the TDSB's plans for townhouses on the Thomson site, resulting in a decision by Scarborough Community Council to place a hold on any further sale or development on either school site pending community consultation. The TDSB appealed to the Ontario Municipal Board. At a protest rally organised by GBAT in February 2015, more than 160 signs were distributed. In May 2015 the local councillor, Michael Thompson, announced that an agreement had been reached with the school district to reserve almost 3 acres of the site for community uses, including a daycare centre that is to be part of the new school; many felt this was insufficient.

The city eventually approved the purchase of 2 acres of the site under this plan. In April 2017, the new Thomson school building was built on its old playing field that took 31 months to complete. The combined school, under its project name, Lawrence Midland Secondary School, was designed in conjunction with the architectural firms of ZAS Architects and Taylor+Smith.

Bendale B.T.I. held its farewell reunion on June 1, 2019, and the final day of regular classes took place on June 13, 2019. The last graduates emerged on June 27, 2019. Colin Dye was the school's final principal.

With the opening of the new Thomson building in December 2019, demolition of Bendale began shortly after and was completed at the end of January 2020. The school's former playing field was retained by the TDSB.

=== Administration at the time of closure ===
- Principal: Colin Dye (transferred to Drewry Secondary School)
- Vice-Principal: Annamaria Mazzaferro (transferred to North Toronto Collegiate Institute)
- Vice-Principal: Zoran Pejovic (transferred to Woburn Collegiate Institute)

== Academics and programs ==
Bendale B.T.I. offered various vocational and technical courses throughout its 57-year existence ranging from automotives, culinary, hairstyling, electricity, plumbing, welding, construction, and green industries. It also offered academic courses such as English, science, mathematics, geography, and history in applied or open levels.

It was a semestered secondary school covering grades 9 to 12 and formerly grade 13 (renamed to Ontario Academic Credit) until 2003.

The school also offered arts and cooperative education programs. In partnership with FoodShare, Bendale had the largest urban organic farm garden in Canada.

Following the merger of the school with David and Mary Thomson, most of its technical courses were integrated into the new school such as construction woodworking, communications, culinary arts, greenhouse/landscaping, hairstyling and industrial design. The automotive, electrical and manufacturing courses were discontinued upon the closure of the school though these similar programs are offered at nearby schools such as Winston Churchill, Cedarbrae, Woburn or the larger Danforth.

== Recognition ==
In February 2010, Bendale principal Cindy Zwicker-Reston became one of Canada's Outstanding Principals Award handed out by The Learning Partnership.

== Notable people ==
=== Notable staff ===
- Sheldon Benoit – CFL player, Bendale teacher

=== Notable alumni ===
- Hassan Phills – Stand-up comedian, actor, content creator

== See also ==
- List of high schools in Ontario
