= Tabor Park Vocational School =

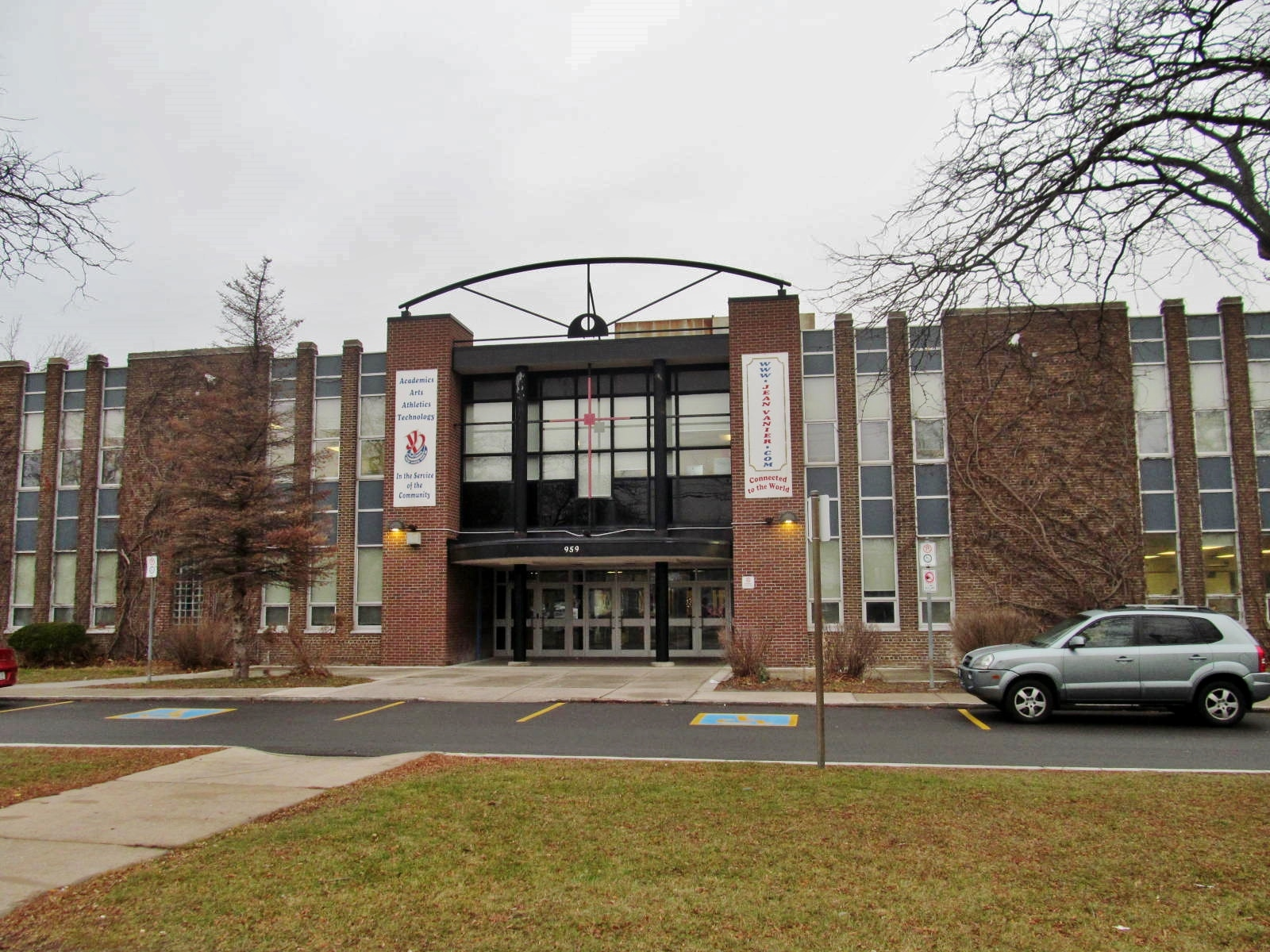
- Tabor Park Vocational School, built in 1965, pictured in 2014. It is occupied by the Toronto Catholic District School Board since 1989.

Location
- 959 Midland Avenue; Knob Hill, Toronto, Ontario, M1K 4G4; Canada

Information
- School type: Vocational High School; Public High School
- Motto: Forward Step by Step
- Religious affiliation: Secular
- Founded: 1965
- Status: Leased out
- Closed: 1986
- School board: Toronto District School Board
- Oversight: Toronto Lands Corporation
- Superintendent: Lynn Strangway; LC3, Executive; Jacqueline Spence; LN13
- Area trustee: Neethan Shan; Ward 17
- School number: 4175 / 946621
- Principal: Lorne H. Kelsey
- Grades: 9-13
- Language: English
- Campus size: 9.5 acres
- Colours: Green, brown, olive, silver, and white
- Team name: Tabor Warriors

Tabor Park Vocational School (Tabor Park HS/VS, TPVS or Tabor) is a public high school in Toronto, Ontario, Canada. It is a Toronto District School Board facility that operated as a public and vocational high school established in 1965 until 1986 to meet the needs of the large baby boom generation in the newly and rapidly developing area of the city operated by the Scarborough Board of Education until its merger with the TDSB in 1998.

When it was built, Tabor Park became the first junior vocational high school in the former City of Scarborough catered to slow learners and students with disabilities. The motto of the school is Forward Step by Step.

== History ==
Bendale Vocational School opened on Midland Avenue on September 3, 1963 as Scarborough’s first technical and vocational high school. Three months later, on December 10, 1963, the Scarborough Board of Education has approved the acquisition of the 9.5 acre junior vocational site on the Eglinton Avenue and Midland Avenue area with the spaces for 700 pupils for $250,000.00. The land on the property was once a transmitter for CKEY-AM owned by Toronto Broadcasting Co. and the SBE acquired the 5 acres for $4,500.00.

The school was designed by Webb, Zerafa and Menkes architects and work began in 1964. On September 7, 1965, Tabor Park opened for classes with 10 classrooms, a small library, cafetorium, double gymnasium, professional kitchen, several shops for cosmetology, merchandise, textiles, automotives, sheet metal, carpentry and greenhouse. The library and other components were added in 1981 at the cost of $237,550.

With the success of Tabor Park, the SBE began to expand its model to Maplewood Vocational School (1967) to the east and Sir William Osler Vocational School (1975) to the north. Both schools remain in existence today. Maplewood, however, had to share classrooms with Tabor Park in the 1967-68 school year, whose building was not completed on time.

As enrollment numbers had begun to erode to less than 500 students, the SBE began holding public meetings regarding Tabor Park on November 6, 1985, along with Maplewood the next day. Shortly afterwards, the school board elected to close Tabor Park as an operating school in June 1986.

The building later re-opened as Scarborough Centre for Alternative Studies the following September. In its early years, Tabor housed several agencies including Scarborough Housing Assistance: Placement and Education for Singles (SHAPES), the counseling service Metro Youth Services, a day care facility operated by NYAD (Not Your Average Day Care), and the board's Community Liaison Office. In May 1988, the SCAS/Tabor Park property was turned over to the Metropolitan Separate School Board (later known as the Toronto Catholic District School Board) which allowed the $8 million renovations and expansion at Agincourt Collegiate Institute and Albert Campbell Collegiate Institute. The MSSB/TCDSB opened Jean Vanier Catholic Secondary School, now known as St. Joan of Arc Catholic Academy, in the building in 1989.

== Academic and vocational programs ==
During its near 20-year existence, Tabor Park had served students with slow learning skills and special needs with academic and life skills programs.

In addition to its basic academic programs for English, mathematics, science, art and geography; the school’s facilities were equipped with shop classrooms for automotives, woodworking, welding, plumbing, electrical, production assembly, sheet metal, greenhouse, textiles, hairdressing, child care, professional kitchens, building maintenance and merchandising.

== See also ==
- List of high schools in Ontario
- St. Joan of Arc Catholic Academy, previously named Jean Vanier Catholic Secondary School
