= Scarborough Board of Education =

Board of Education for the City of Scarborough

The Board of Education for the City of Scarborough District 16

Location
- 140 Borough Drive; Scarborough, Ontario, Canada; M1P 4N6 Canada

District information
- Established: 1954
- Closed: December 31, 1997
- School board: 14 trustees + 3 separate school representatives
- Chair of the board: Gaye Dale
- Director of education: Earl G. Campbell
- District ID: SBE

Students and staff
- Students: 81,000 (1996)
- Staff: 8,300 (1996)

Corporate logo.

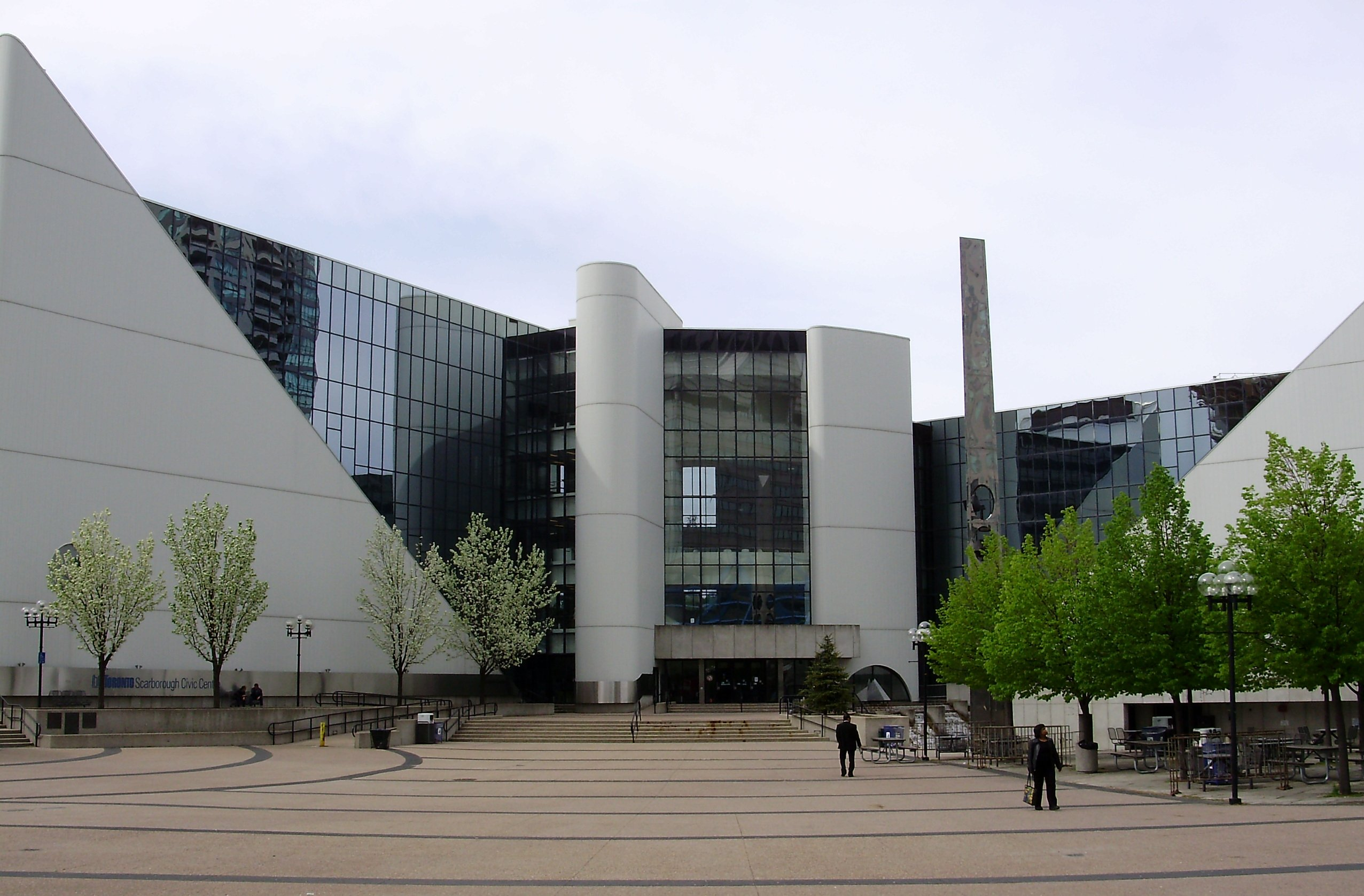
The TDSB East Education Office in the Scarborough Civic Centre; formerly housed the offices of SBE.

The Scarborough Board of Education (SBE, commonly known as School District 16), formally the Board of Education for the City of Scarborough was the public-secular school district serving Scarborough, Ontario, Canada. The board was founded in 1954 through a merger of the Scarborough Collegiate and Township School Boards.

As of 1996, the SBE had served over 81,000 students and 8,300 employed staff. It was the largest school board in the former Metro Toronto.

In 1998, the SBE was merged into the Toronto District School Board. The former SBE offices in Borough Drive. remain in use by the TDSB as the East Education Office.

== History ==
Scarborough's first schools were scattered across:

- Hough's Corners (SS#8 were Alexander Muir once taught)
- West Hill (SS#16)
- Woburn (SS#6)
- L'Amoreaux at Birchmount and Finch (SS#1)
- Ellesmere Village at Kennedy and Ellemere (SS#5 built 1871 replaced a school at Midland and Ellesmere from 1848)
- Hillside (SS#12 in 1853)
- Finch/McCowan (SS#2 or later as A. P. Wheeler School).
- Scarborough Village (SS#9 in 1847 and successor was Scarborough Village PS in 1913)

Around 1913 to 1916, more schools were added:

- Southwest Scarborough (Birch Cliff or SS#15)
- Scarborough Village (replaced SS#9)
- Agincourt at Midland north of Sheppard (SS#14)

In need for secondary education, Agincourt Continuation School was established in 1915 in the elementary school building while senior grades were done in Markham District High School. However, by 1919, many students in south Scarborough had attended Malvern Collegiate Institute in East Toronto, which became a reality in 1922 when Scarboro High School opened its doors with classic specialist Dr. Reginald H. King as principal, three teachers and 116 pupils.

By the early 1940s the public school inspector for Scarborough, H. A. Halbert, initiated a movement to amalgamate these small school sections to form Township School Areas known as the Scarborough Township Public School Board, each with a Board of five Trustees, which would be better able to meet Scarborough's modern educational needs. Between 1944 and 1947, the township board was divided into three areas:

- Area 1: Southwest Scarborough (School sections 10, 12, 13, 15)
- Area 2: Central Scarborough (School sections 7, 8, 9, 16 – Area 6 joined in 1953)
- Area 3: North Scarborough (School sections 5 and 14)

Towards the end of 1953, there were 32 schools with 13,227 students and 356 teaching staff.

On January 1, 1954, The Collegiate and Township Boards merged into the new Scarborough Board of Education. Dr. King, the principal of Scarborough C.I. became the first Director of Education. As the architecture of these new schools was simple, functional and unpretentious, the earlier models were sometimes subject to criticism as bearing too close a resemblance to long, low factory buildings. However, as school succeeded school, their style and appearance was progressively improved. In some of the more recent buildings distinctions have begun to emerge. Residents accustomed to the bare brick schoolhouses of the rural period see updates in the latest modern school buildings composed of glass, steel, and brick. New features include: kindergarten classrooms with heated floors, libraries, manual training and household science rooms, rooms for nurses and teachers, spacious dual purpose gymnasiums and auditoriums with stages, and modern equipment such as motion picture projectors, tape recorders and even television sets. Many children are also transported daily to school in school buses; which ends the era of the day of the long walk to school despite weather conditions.

With overcrowding at Scarborough Collegiate Institute and Agincourt High School, they were incapable of coping with the crowds of students seeking secondary education. This led to the construction of its third high school Winston Churchill Collegiate Institute, named after Winston Churchill, on Kennedy and Lawrence in the Dorset Park area on December 4, 1953, with the first 657 pupils admitted on September 7, 1954. One year later, West Hill Collegiate Institute on Morningside Avenue in West Hill opened on September 6, 1955, to 376 students. That year it was also necessary to enlarge Agincourt Collegiate Institute by the addition of seventeen rooms and a gymnasium.

Then followed in rapid succession the building of four more great secondary schools to meet the need for accommodation for 1,200 more students each year. In 1958, W. A. Porter Collegiate Institute –whose school named after the science master and assistant principal of Scarborough's first High School for many years from its opening in 1922 – was completed on Fairfax Crescent in the Clairlea district. To it was later added a notable new feature, an indoor swimming pool, the first of its kind in Scarborough. In 1959, the David and Mary Thomson Collegiate Institute, a 1,200 pupil school costing $1,728,400.00, was constructed on Lawrence Avenue a short distance west of the first settler's home in the forests of 1796.

Next in 1960, the SBE's most ambitious venture in secondary education, the huge Cedarbrae Secondary School, was built at a cost of over $3,500,000.00, on the hillside overlooking the site of Peter Secor's grist mill of 1830, on the west side of the Markham Road. Designed as a composite school, it offered a wide variety of courses, Arts and Science, Commercial, Technical and Trades; and it included well equipped vocational shops, gymnasiums, swimming pool, auditorium with professionally lighted and curtained stage, and numerous other modern school facilities. The school was opened in September 1961. However, its eighth composite secondary school, Midland Avenue Secondary School opened in 1962. Like Cedarbrae, the school was equipped with an auditorium with seats, large rounded circular cafeteria, triple gymnasium, swimming pool and several commercial and technical shops.

The combined enrollment of 11,470 students and a staff of 526 teachers in eight collegiate institutes and the construction of yet more schools was in progress. On Ellesmere and Markham the basic high steel framework and long brick walls of the great new Woburn Collegiate Institute were rising behind the little red brick schoolhouse of 1863, from whose belfry had rung the call to classes that took generations of pupils from the farms of School Section No.6. The new Woburn C.I. admitted its first students the next autumn; and on Midland Avenue and Lawrence, Bendale Vocational School, planned especially for the benefit of students who normally drop out of school before completing Grade 12 or even 10, was also opened in 1963. The next year, 1964, Birchmount Park Collegiate Institute, built on the ridge overlooking Birch Cliff – which was once the shore of Lake Iroquois in ancient glacial times – and is attached to Birchmount Stadium, and the Sir John A. Macdonald Collegiate Institute (formerly O'Sullivan Secondary) on Pharmacy Avenue north of Sheppard, were completed.

Above the great bluffs towering up from the lake at Guildwood Village, where land once sold for six York shillings or seventy-five cents an acre in 1803, the Board of Education acquired fourteen and one-fifth acres at a cost of $303,700 for another school, and there the building of the Sir Wilfrid Laurier Collegiate Institute was begun in the latter part of 1964. At the beginning of 1965, on Midland Avenue north of Eglinton, the walls of the Tabor Park Vocational School, named after one of Scarborough's early schoolmasters, were built up to the second story; and work on the new Wexford Collegiate Institute on Pharmacy Avenue north of Lawrence was well advanced. There were now 15,000 students enrolled in Scarborough's secondary schools, and 761 teachers on the staff.

The SBE in September 1968, found itself responsible for the education of about 78,000 students, enrolled in more than 100 elementary and secondary schools. Some schools were surrounded by as many as 10 and 12 portables, and the total number of such temporary classrooms in use was 257. But while called on to wrestle continually with the accommodation issue, a building programme which never quite catches up with the spiralling growth of the Borough, and a budget requiring a tax levy of nearly 40 million dollars, the Board of 1968 still finds time to escape from the rut of routine business and explore new ground. Under the far-sighted leadership of its chairman, Muriel A. Clarke, and the dynamic Director of Education, Anson S. Taylor, the Board introduced a concept of new tri-level system of together with a Secondary School on a common campus. One such campus is now in operation in the Bendale Secondary School area; and a yet more imaginatively conceived three-school community was under construction on the Stephen Leacock Collegiate Institute site on Birchmount Road north of Sheppard Avenue as well as Sir Oliver Mowat Collegiate Institute on Lawrence and Centennial in Rouge Park. Both schools were opened in 1970. Its keen interest in training for young people unable to progress academically beyond public school still continues; and another well equipped Vocational School, three and a half million dollar Maplewood Vocational School, was opened in 1968 despite a year delay on Galloway Road in West Hill. However, in 1966, Sir Robert L. Borden Secondary School opened its doors.

By the beginning of the 1970s, the Scarborough community began to develop. In 1973, L'Amoreaux Collegiate Institute, located near School Section No. 1, was built on Warden and Finch and designed by Raymond Moriyama. The school was built with a forum and cafetorium in place of the auditorium to save costs. By 1976, Albert Campbell Collegiate Institute was opened on Finch and McCowan. This was followed by the three-level Lester B. Pearson Collegiate Institute in 1978 in the Malvern district and its final collegiate Dr. Norman Bethune Collegiate Institute, on the Warden/Steeles area, was opened in 1979. Meanwhile, two more technical schools, Timothy Eaton Secondary School, named after Timothy Eaton was opened on Finch and Warden in 1971 and Sir William Osler Vocational School was opened on Huntingwood and Midland in Agincourt in 1975.

As of 1985, there were over 160 elementary schools and 25 secondary schools.

In the first of its kind in Scarborough, inspired by George S. Henry Academy, the SBE had converted R. H. King Collegiate Institute into R. H. King Academy in September 1989. The new academy functioned as a quasi-private school enrolling students from out of area and the school featured clinics, mentorships and mandatory school uniforms.

In 1992, the SBE and the Centennial College made a deal to establish an adult education centre, the Scarborough Career Planning Centre, at the Centennial College. In 1994 the entities agreed to establish the centre there beginning in the fall of that year.

Plans were made to conduct the Scarborough Alternative For Educating Troubled Youths (SAFETY) program in 1994. The program was designed for students with twenty-day suspensions, the maximum period possible, in the former Highbrook Senior Public School facility. Community protests put these plans on hold and were never materialized. Currently, the SAFETY program was later evolved into the TDSB's Caring and 'Safe School' programs.

On December 31, 1997, the SBE, as with the other school boards in Metro Toronto, was dissolved. The board was merged into the new Toronto District School Board the following year.

== Organization ==
The Scarborough Board of Education, at its peak, had 14 elected trustees with three delegates from the Metropolitan Separate School Board as of 1985.

Following provincial legislation directing amalgamation of the Scarborough Board with the other boards making up the old Metro Toronto School Board (Toronto, North York, East York, Etobicoke and Scarborough) the last meeting of the SBE was held on November 27, 1997, chaired by Mrs. Gaye Dale, Trustee of Scarborough Ward 1 and chairman of the board.

== Schools ==
Scarborough's schools were built from the 1940s to 1960s. Older 19th- and 20th-century school houses were demolished to make way for large buildings as the area grew.

On the north end of the city schools were built from the 1960s to 1980s.

At one time the board operated educational programs for Francophone students. The Conseil des écoles françaises de la communauté urbaine de Toronto (CEFCUT) assumed control of French-language education in the Toronto area on 1 December 1988.

=== Elementary schools ===
==== Junior Public Schools (and mixed) ====
From 1968 to 1980s, many existing Kindergarten to Grade 8 schools were redesignated as Junior Public School, targeting pupils ages 4 to 12 from kindergarten to grade 6 only.

Name	Opened	Notes	Image
Hillside Public School	1855	Began as S.S. # 12 in 1853.; Current building from 1872.; Former Township of Scarborough school.; Building was moved, modified and became outdoor education centre 1975.	
Birch Cliff Public School	1916	Former Township of Scarborough school.; Additions in 1919, 1922, 1951, 1953, and 1955.	
Highland Creek Public School	1918	Began as S.S. #7 1851 and rebuilt 1878.; Former Township of Scarborough school.; Current school has additions added 1949, 1951–52, 1955, 1960–62.	
Donwood Park Public School	1956	Formerly designated as Junior Public School from 1968 to 2013.	
Walter Perry Junior Public School	1954	Named after community leader William Walter Perry.	
Iroquois Junior Public School	1969	Located near Iroquois Park.	
North Brimwood Junior Public School	1966	Named after the North Brimwood community it is located in.	
Norman Cook Junior Public School	1953	Named for local settler and school district trustee (1931–1943) Norman Cook.; Former Township of Scarborough school.	
St. Andrews Public School	1959	Built on estate of David and Mary Thomson; Formerly designated as Junior Public School from 1968 to 1985.	
Anson S. Taylor Public School	1977	Named for SBE Director of Education (1957–1977) Anson S. Taylor (d. 2007).	
John A Leslie Public School	1923	Formerly known as Midland Avenue Public School c. 1923; Former Township of Scarborough school; Renamed in 1950 for former York East MPP (1945–1948) John A. Leslie (d. 1965)	
Terry Fox Public School	1981	Named after Marathon of Hope runner Terry Fox.	
Oakridge Junior Public School	1967	Replaced the original Oakridge c.1895 (Began as S.S. # 10 in Scarboro Junction c. 1850); Rebuilt 1870 and 1900.	
West Rouge Junior Public School	1954	Transferred from Ontario County Board of Education (now Durham District School Board) 1974 when West Rouge was transferred from Township of Durham to Borough of Scarborough	
William G Davis Junior Public School	1967	Transferred from Ontario County Board of Education in 1974 when West Rouge was transferred from Township of Durham to Borough of Scarborough.; Named for then Minister of Education (and later Premier) William Grenville Davis.	
Centennial Road Junior Public School	1946		
Charlottetown Junior Public School	1967	Located on Charlottetown Blvd.	
Chester Le Public School	1972		
Fairglen Public School	1966		
Beverly Glen Junior Public School	1972		
David Lewis Public School	1990	Named for politician, federal NDP Leader and York South MP (1962–1971) David Lewis (1909–1981).	
Brookmill Boulevard Public School	1975		
Bridlewood Public School	1966	Named after the Bridlewood community it is located in.	
Timberbank Public School	1969		
Pauline Johnson Public School	1969	Named after Mohawk poet Pauline Johnson (1861–1913).	
Kennedy Public School	1988	Named after settler Kennedy family (likely settler and soldier John Kennedy).	
Silver Springs Public School	1975	Located in the area covered by former S.S. #1 – L'Amoreaux c. 1847.	
Highland Heights Public School	1967	Named after the Highland Heights community it is located in.	
Port Royal Public School	1992	Named for Samuel de Champlain's Port Royal Habitation (c. 1605) now Annapolis Royal NHS.	
Milliken Public School	1982	Named after the Milliken ( settled by Norman Milliken 1807) community it is located in.; First Milliken school serving area was S.S. #2 at McCowan Road and Finch Avenue (burned down 1851 and rebuilt in 1853).; School became A.P. Wheler and closed in 1968.; From 1929 to 1954 second Milliken or Union Public School was built in Markham (Midland Avenue and Steeles Avenue) and served both Markham and Scarborough.; Second school demolished with front facade now incorporated into condominium building.	
Alexmuir Public School	1973		
Chartland Public School	1968		
North Agincourt Public School	1957	Named after the North Agincourt community it is located in.	
C.D. Farquharson Junior Public School	1954	Named after Dr Charles D. Farquharson, Chief Medical Officer for Scarborough 1921–1964.	
Agnes MacPhail Public School	1980–1981	Named after politician (York East MPP 1943–1945/1948-1951 and Grey Bruce/Grey Southeast MP 1921–1940) Agnes MacPhail (1890–1954)	
Macklin Public School	1988	Named after early settler Marshall Macklin.	
Tom Longboat Public School	1978	Named after First Nations runner Tom Longboat.	
Malvern Public School	1977	Named after the Malvern community it is located in.	
Heritage Park Public School	1994		
Alexander Stirling Public School	1984	Named after local settler Alexander Stirling	
Berner Trail Public School	1973	Named for C.H. Berner Public School c. 1872 (S.S. #3) and built on C.H. Berner's farmland.; Berner was S.S. #6 school trustee.; Original school house now used by Whitefield Christian School.	
Grey Owl Public School	1975	Named after British conservationist Grey Owl	
Emily Carr Public School	1980	Named after artist Emily Carr	
Fleming Public School	1990	Built on the Andrew Fleming farm	
Maryvale Public School	1955		
Wexford Public School	1951	Named after the Wexford community it is located in.; Former Township of Scarborough school.; Linked to S.S. #8 opened in Wexford area or Hough's Corners c. 1847.	
Vradenburg Public School	1955	School built on Ichabod Vradenburg (1815–1892) farm	
Buchanan Public School	1954	Built on land farmed by Buchanan family c. 1830.	
Manhattan Park Junior Public School	1956	Named after an adjacent park.; Opened as a Kindergarten to Grade 5 school, Grade 6 was added in the 1960s.	
George Peck Public School	1955	Named after school trustee and Scarborough Centre MPP George Peck.	
Inglewood Heights Public School	1956	Named after the Inglewood Heights community it is located in.	
Lynngate Public School	1960		
Ellesmere Junior Public School	1951	Formerly designated as a Junior Public School from 1973 to 1985.; Former Township of Scarborough school.; Earlier school Ellesmere (S.S. #5) was built at Ellesmere Road and Midland Road in 1848, then moved to north side of Ellesmere west of Kennedy Road in 1871 (burned down 1946).	
Dorset Park Public School	1954	Named after the Dorset Park community it is located in.	
General Crerar Public School	1954	Named after military officer General Harry Crerar.	
Ionview Public School	1953	Named after the Ionview community it is located in.; Former Township of Scarborough school.	
Lord Roberts Junior Public School	1958	Named after British military officer Frederick Roberts, 1st Earl Roberts	
Hunter's Glen Junior Public School	1956		
Glen Ravine Junior Public School	1956		
Edgewood Public School	1958	Formerly designated as Junior Public School from 1968 to 1985.	
Knob Hill Public School	1956	Formerly designated as Junior Public School from 1969 to 2011.	
McCowan Road Junior Public School	1954	Named after nearby McCowan Road.; TDSB closed the school in 2011.	
Pringdale Gardens Junior Public School	1963	Built on the Pring family farm.; Closed and school demolished in 2013–14.; Site now a housing a sub-division.	
Cedarbrook Public School	1958	Formerly designated as Junior Public School from 1969 to 2011.	
White Haven Public School	1968		
Bendale Junior Public School	1957	Named after the Bendale community it is located in.	
North Bendale Junior Public School	1960	Named after the North Bendale community it is located in.	
Bellmere Junior Public School	1965	Designed by John Andrews.; Rebuilt in the 1970s after the fire.	
William Tredway Junior Public School	1956	Named after settler family Tredway.; Formerly designated as Junior Public School from 1968 to 2015.; Merged with J.S. Woodsworth in 2015.	
Woburn Junior Public School	1964	Replaced original Woburn school near Woburn C.I.(formerly S.S. # 6 c. 1863)	
Churchill Heights Public School	1957		
Golf Road Junior Public School	1953	Located on Scarborough Golf Club Road.; Former Township of Scarborough school.	
Cornell Junior Public School	1954	Named for settler Cornell family.	
Willow Park Junior Public School	1964		
Heather Heights Junior Public School	1959	The Ben Heppner Vocal Music Academy opened in 2012, for grades 4 to 8.; Named after Ben Heppner.	
George B. Little Public School	1957	Named after Lt. Col. George Burnfield Little, an officer in the Boer War, and the Reeve of Scarborough Township from 1928 to 1931.	
Burrows Hall Public School	1974	Named for Burrows Hall meeting place.	
Lucy Maud Montgomery Public School	1970s (~1972)	Named after writer Lucy Maud Montgomery	
Brooks Road Public School	1970		
Military Trail Public School	1970	Named for historic road Military Trail.	
St. Margaret's Public School	1972		
Galloway Road Public School	1958	Named for local Galloway.	
Eastview Public School	1955		
Morrish Public School	1989–1990	Named after local Morrish family.	
West Hill Public School	1994	Built to replace original school c. 1878.	
Heron Park Public School	1949	Named for Heron family farm. * Former Township of Scarborough school.	
Peter Secor Public School	1962	Named for local settler Peter Secor.	
William G Miller Public School	1959	Named for school trustee William G. Miller.	
John G. Diefenbaker Public School	1980–1981	Named after former Prime Minister John Diefenbaker	
Meadowvale Public School	1953	Former Township of Scarborough school.; Addition added 1970.	
Rouge Valley Public School	1992		
Regent Heights Public School	1921	Formerly designated as Junior Public School from 1971 to 2009.; Formerly known as Regent's Park Public School.; Former Township of Scarborough school.	
Warden Avenue Public School	1952	Renamed to Taylor Creek Public School in 2017.; Formerly linked to nearby Wardin Park residential development c. 1912.; Former Township of Scarborough school.	
General Brock Public School	1956	Named after British officer Issac Brock.	
Danforth Gardens Public School	1957		
Birch Cliff Heights Public School	1922	Former Township of Scarborough school.	
Corvette Junior Public School	1954	Named for Royal Canadian Navy's Flower-class corvettes from WWII	
J. G. Workman Public School	1949	Named after the school trustee for the Scarborough Collegiate Board.; Former Township of Scarborough school.	
Cliffside Public School	1952	Former Township of Scarborough school.	
Chine Drive Public School	1956		
H.A. Halbert Junior Public School	1951	Named after school inspector. * Former Township of Scarborough school.	
Fairmount Public School	1951	Formerly designated as Junior Public School from 1973 to 2011.; Former Township of Scarborough school.	
Mason Road Junior Public School	1957		
Anson Park Public School	1959		
Cedar Drive Junior Public School	1970		
George P Mackie Public School	1954	Named for school trustee George P. Mackie.	
Elizabeth Simcoe Public School	1963	Named after Elizabeth Simcoe wife of Lt. Gov. of Upper Canada John Graves Simcoe	
Guildwood Village Public School	1959	Named for the Guildwood Village community in which it is located.	
Poplar Road Public School	1960		
Courcelette Public School	1958	Replaced S.S. #13 c. 1911 as Chester Avenue PS.; Renamed 1917 as Courcelette Road Public School after Battle of Courcelette with additions added in 1919, 1951.; Renamed 1959 with Road dropped.	
Thomas L. Wells Public School	2005	Post-amalgamation elementary school.; Named after local Member of Provincial Parliament and provincial Minister of Education Thomas Leonard Wells.	
Brookside Public School	2007	Post-amalgamation elementary school.	
Alvin Curling Public School	2013	Post-amalgamation elementary school.; Named after Jamaican-born politician and diplomat Alvin Curling.	
Harold R. Lawson School	1963–1964	Intellectual disability school run with Metro Toronto School Board.; Closed by TDSB in 2001 and sold to Community Living Toronto in 2009.	

==== Senior Public Schools ====
In 1967, the SBE introduced a concept known as "Senior Public School", which were middle schools serving children ages 12 to 14 from grades 7 and 8. To date, only 16 middle schools were built. The amenities each school had one double gymnasium (with or without stages), cafetoriums or cafeterias, science labs, lockers and shops.

The concept was abandoned in the 1980s and future schools were simply changed to K-8 schools instead.

Name	Opened	Notes	Image
Bliss Carman Senior Public School	1973	Named after poet Bliss Carman.	
Charles Gordon Senior Public School	1970	Named for author Charles William Gordon	
Dr Marion Hillard Senior Public School	1978	Named after physician Dr Anna Marion Hilliard	
Henry Hudson Senior Public School	1971	Named after English explorer Henry Hudson	
Henry Kelsey Senior Public School	1971	Named for fur trader Henry Kelsey	
Highbrook Senior Public School	1968	Closed 1980s and used as ASE and Highbrook Learning Centre / SCAS.: Re-opened in 2013 as an extension to Donwood Park	
J. S. Woodsworth Senior Public School	1970	Named after labour leader J. S. Woodsworth.; First students admitted January 1970. Merged with William Tredway in 2015.	
J.B. Tyrell Senior Public School	1973	Named after geologist Joseph Tyrrell	
Jack Miner Senior Public School	1970	Named after naturalist and conservationist	
John McCrae Senior Public School	1969	Named after poet and military officer John McCrae; Brutalist architecture; Became K-8 school in 2011.	
Joseph Brant Senior Public School	1969	Named after First Nations leader Joseph Brant. Converted to K-8 school in 2012.	
Joseph Howe Senior Public School	1977	Named for Joseph Howe, former Nova Scotia Lieutenant Governor, Premier and MLA.; Transferred from Ontario County Board of Education in 1974 when West Rouge was transferred from Township of Durham to Borough of Scarborough.	
Robert Service Senior Public School	1971	Named after poet Robert Service	
Samuel Hearne Senior Public School	1971	Named after explorer Samuel Hearne	
Scarborough Village Senior Public School	1861 as S.S. No. 9	Replaced in 1913 with a new structure.; Former Township of Scarborough school.; Designated as Senior Public School in 1970 operating from Grades 7 and 8 only.; Reopened in 1974 as a K-8 alternative school.; Rebuilt in 1997–98.	
Sir Alexander Mackenzie Senior Public School	1972	Named for explorer Alexander Mackenzie	
Sir Ernest MacMillan Senior Public School	1981	Named after Ernest MacMillan	
Tecumseh Senior Public School	1968	Named for Tecumseh	
Wendell Statton Senior Public School	1973	Building attached with Ellesmere Jr. P.S.; Merged with Ellesmere Jr.	

=== Secondary schools ===
==== Collegiate institutes ====
Name	Opened	Notes	Image
Agincourt Collegiate Institute	1915	Formerly Agincourt Continuation/High School	
Alternative Scarborough Education 1	1975	Shared space with St. Andrews PS	
Delphi Secondary Alternative School	1981	Alternative Scarborough Education 2 – located a Chartland PS	
Dr. Norman Bethune Collegiate Institute	1979	named after surgeon Dr Norman Bethune	
Birchmount Park Collegiate Institute	1964		
Albert Campbell Collegiate Institute	1976	Named after Reeve of Scarborough.; Built near old A.P. Wheeler Public School (former School Section #2) now Woodside Square after McCowan Road realignment.	
Cedarbrae Collegiate Institute	1961		
Winston Churchill Collegiate Institute	1954	Named after British PM	
R. H. King Academy	1922	Previously known R.H. King Collegiate Institute and Scarborough High School/Collegiate.; Named after Reginald Harold King (1896–1962), founding director of the Scarborough Board of Education.	
L'Amoreaux Collegiate Institute	1973	Named for settler family	
Sir Wilfrid Laurier Collegiate Institute	1965	Named for former PM Wilfrid Laurier	
Stephen Leacock Collegiate Institute	1970	Named for writer Stephen Leacock	
Sir John A. Macdonald Collegiate Institute	1964	Named after former PM John A. Macdonald	
Midland Avenue Collegiate Institute	1962	Closed 2000 and became Bond Academy until 2010	
Sir Oliver Mowat Collegiate Institute	1970	Named for former Premier Oliver Mowat	
Lester B. Pearson Collegiate Institute	1978	Named for former PM Lester B. Pearson	
W. A. Porter Collegiate Institute	1958	Named after educator William Arnot Porter	
Scarborough Centre for Alternative Studies	1986	Moved to former Midland CI site 2010	
David and Mary Thomson Collegiate Institute	1959	New school opened in 2019 at the former Bendale Business and Technical Institute property.; Named after David and Mary Thomson, first settlers of Scarborough.	
West Hill Collegiate Institute	1955		
Wexford Collegiate Institute	1965		
Woburn Collegiate Institute	1963		
South East Year Round Alternative Centre	2005	Post-amalgamation secondary school.; Housed at Midland.	

==== Vocational schools ====
The SBE operated six vocational secondary schools that are not classified as regular collegiates. Three schools offered general and basic courses as Business and Technical Institute (formerly Secondary School) while the other three offered basic level courses in a special education level branded as High School (previously known as Vocational School).

Two facilities that have other unique features such as Bendale (swimming pool) and Tabor Park (child care).

Name	Opened	Notes	Image
Bendale Secondary School	1963	Formerly Bendale Vocational School (1963–1965) and renamed to Bendale B.T.I. (1965–1987); Swimming pool	
Maplewood Vocational School	1967	Renamed to Maplewood High School	
Sir Robert L. Borden Secondary School	1966	Renamed to Sir Robert L. Borden B.T.I. in 1987.	
Sir William Osler Vocational School	1975	Renamed to Sir William Osler High School	
Tabor Park Vocational School	1965	Child care; Closed in 1986, renamed to SCAS.; Leased to the Metropolitan Separate School Board since 1989. Occupied by St. Joan of Arc Catholic Academy	
Timothy Eaton Secondary School	1971	Renamed to Timothy Eaton B.T.I. in 1987.; Built in a farmland owned by Timothy Eaton; Closed in 2009, sold as two parcels in 2012.	

=== Core holdings and leased schools ===
Three former SBE have been lease out:

- In 1989, the then Scarborough Board of Education leased Tabor Park Vocation School (High School) to the Metropolitan Separate School Board (now the Toronto Catholic District School Board) and now operates as St. Joan of Arc Catholic Academy.
- McCowan Road Junior Public School opened 1954 was closed in 2011 and is leased out to UMC High School. It was previously occupied by Wali Ur Asr Islamic School.
- Gooderham Public School (1955–1999) is now Gooderham Adult Learning Centre via leased to the City of Toronto.

== Directors of Education ==
- Reginald H. King (1896–1962) 1954–1960
- Anson S. Taylor (1918–2007) 1961–1977
- Bill Parish (1924–2018) 1977–1982
- Pat McLoughlin 1982–1986
- Cameron A. Cowan 1986–1992
- Earl G. Campbell 1992–1998

== Facilities ==
The board's administrative offices were located at 140 Borough Drive within the Scarborough Civic Centre. Buses and board vehicles were later stored on McLevin Avenue (McGriskin). The administrative offices remain in use today by the Toronto District School Board.

Until 1973, the board offices was also located at Scarborough Municipal Offices at 2100 Eglinton Avenue near Birchmount Road (built after World War II now demolished and site of parking lot). The new SBE administrative offices, located at 2466 Eglinton Avenue East (northside of Eglinton and west of Midland Avenue) and designed by architect Harold Carter, were built in 1954 and administrative operations were relocated in 1973. The former building was declared redundant by 1986 and was replaced by Rainbow Village condos in 1990.

The board operated a fleet of their own school buses, similar to the Toronto Board of Education and Board of Education of North York and were stored at 2466 Eglinton Avenue East site.

Hillside Outdoor Education Centre, formerly Hillside PS (SS No 4), was used for outdoor education programs and located near Rouge Park and still used as such by the TDSB.
