= Sir Robert L. Borden Business and Technical Institute =

Former high school in Toronto, Ontario, Canada

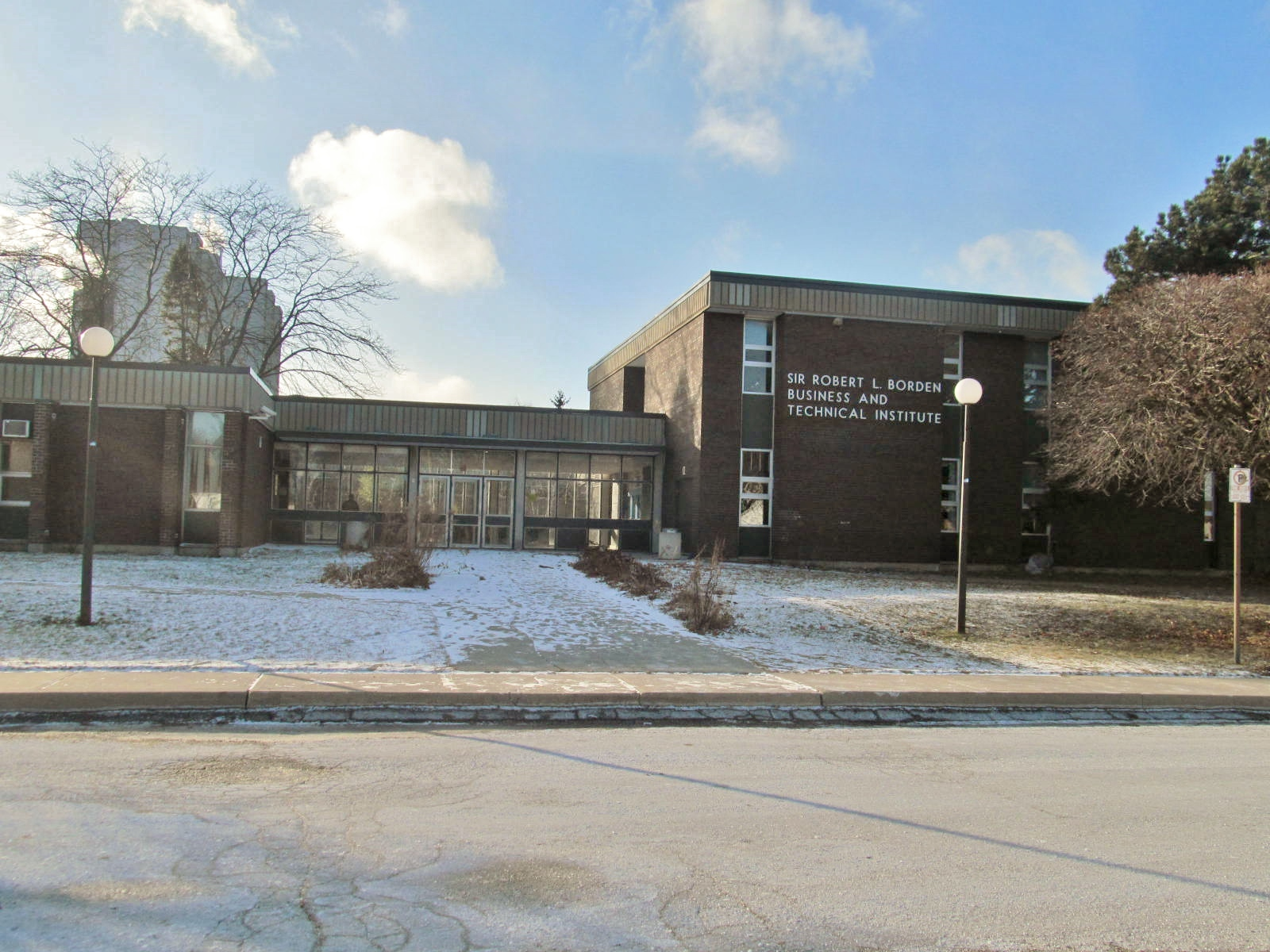

Location
- 200 Poplar Road; Toronto, Ontario, M1E 1Z7; Canada; 43.763541°N 79.189783°W

Information
- School type: Public, High school Vocational High school
- Motto: Auspicium Melioris Aevi (Hope Of A Better Age)
- Founded: 1966
- Closed: June 30, 2016
- School board: Toronto District School Board (Scarborough Board of Education)
- Oversight: Toronto Lands Corporation
- Superintendent: Kerry-Lynn Stadnyk
- Area trustee: Jerry Chadwick
- School number: 4160 / 942022
- Administrator: Jemma Baptiste; Michelle Shearer
- Principal: Patrick Knight
- Grades: 10-12
- Enrollment: 281 (2014-15)
- Language: English
- Colours: Blue and Gold
- Team name: Borden Falcons
- Website: bordenbti.com

Sir Robert L. Borden Business and Technical Institute is a defunct high school facility Toronto, Ontario, Canada that formerly served as a technical public high school. Located in the former suburb of located in the Scarborough, it was established by the Scarborough Board of Education which later merged into the present Toronto District School Board from 1966 to 2016. The school was named after Robert Borden, a Canadian lawyer and politician who was the eighth Prime Minister of Canada from 1911 to 1920. The motto of Sir Robert L. Borden was Auspicium Melioris Aevi (Hope for a Better Age). The school ceased to exist at the end of the 2015–16 academic year end due to declining admissions. Future use of the building remains uncertain.

== History ==
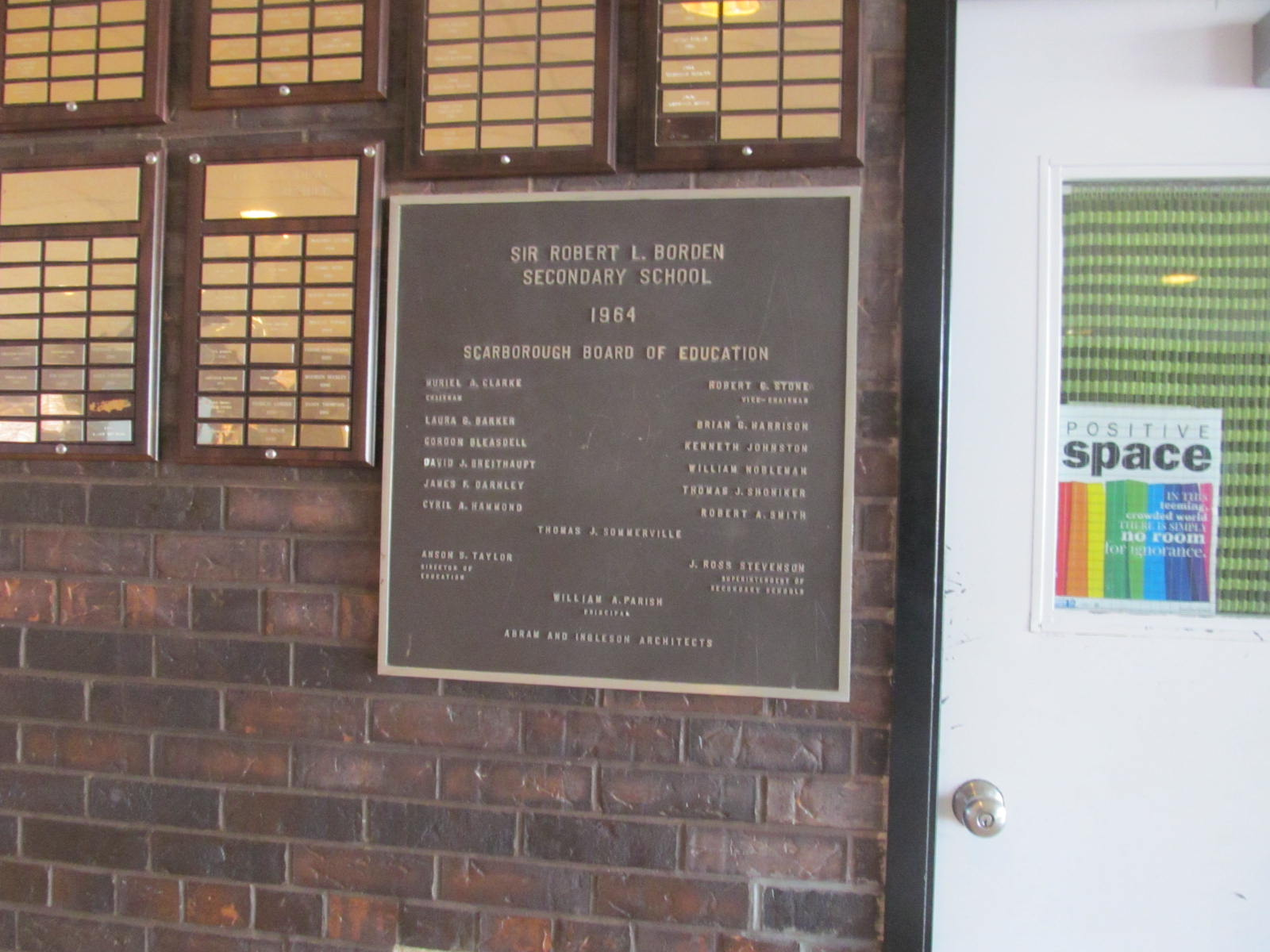
Sir Robert L. Borden S.S. official plaque issued in 1964 seen on the wall

Designed by the architects Abram and Ingleson, Sir Robert L. Borden Secondary School was built in 1964 and was opened on September 6, 1966 by the Scarborough Board of Education as a first occupational school in the eastern Scarborough community and the second technical school. The school was one of two schools based on Bendale Secondary School which had opened in 1963. Since 1987, the school used the present name, Sir Robert L. Borden B.T.I. The school celebrated its 25th anniversary in 1991.

The school's official colours were blue and gold.

Eventually, Borden closed in June 2016 with the last of the remaining pupils graduated Borden on that same week. One month prior, the school building was placed at the hands of the Toronto Lands Corporation for sale.

After closure, the City of Toronto plans to convert the former school into a community hub.

Borden B.T.I.’s school structure is currently the only surviving former technical school in Scarborough not to be demolished to date (Timothy Eaton was torn down in 2014 after closing for five years and Bendale six months after closure in early 2020.)

== Notable alumni ==
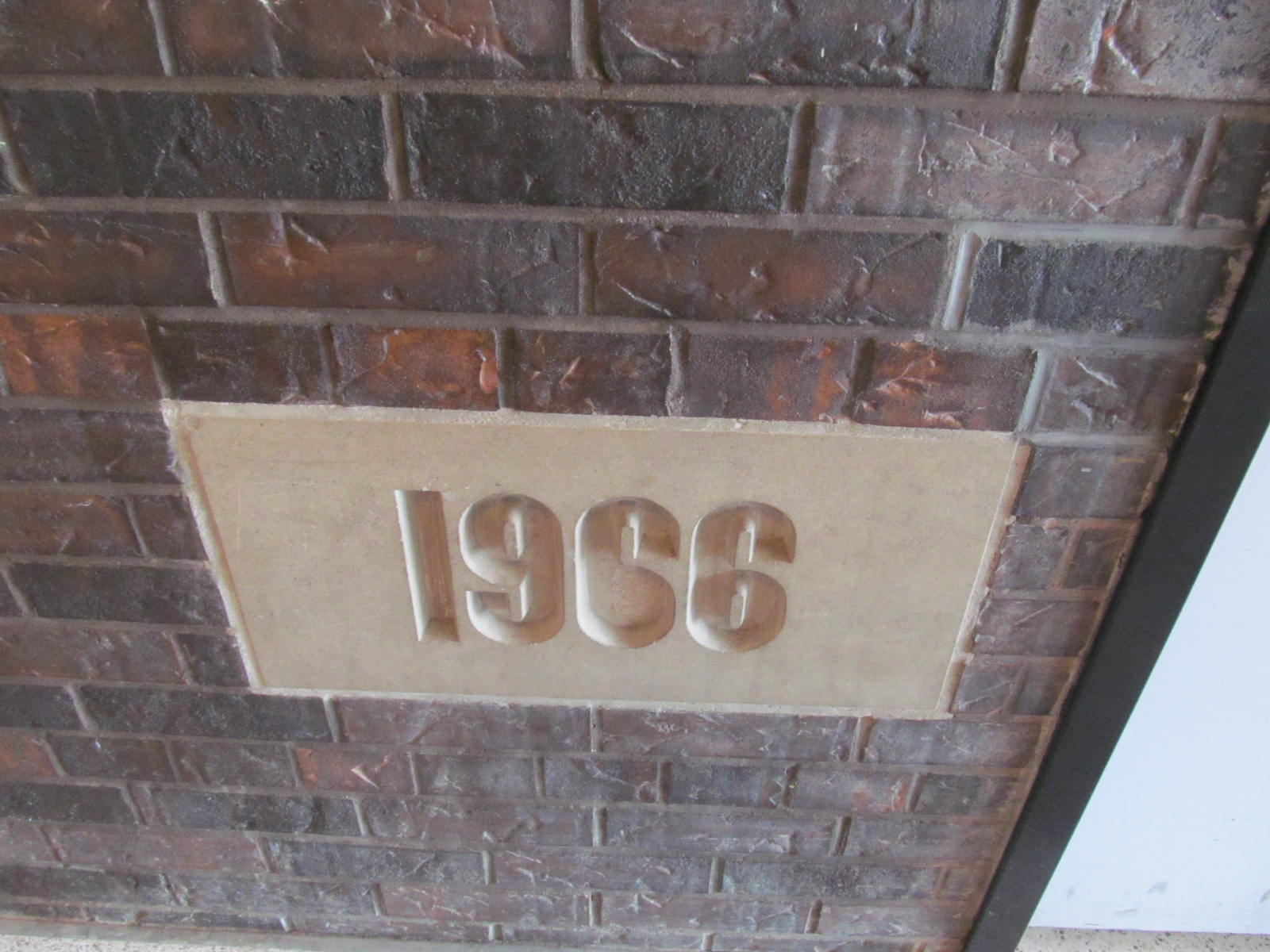
The "1966" datestone

- Orlando Franklin - NFL offensive lineman

== See also ==
- List of high schools in Ontario
