= Maplewood High School =

Maplewood High School may mean:

- Maplewood High School (Ohio) in Cortland, Ohio, USA
- Maplewood High School (Toronto) in Scarborough, Ontario, M1E 1W7, Canada
- Maplewood Comprehensive High School in Nashville, Tennessee, USA
- Maplewood Richmond Heights High School in Maplewood, Missouri, USA
