= Sir John A. Macdonald Collegiate Institute =

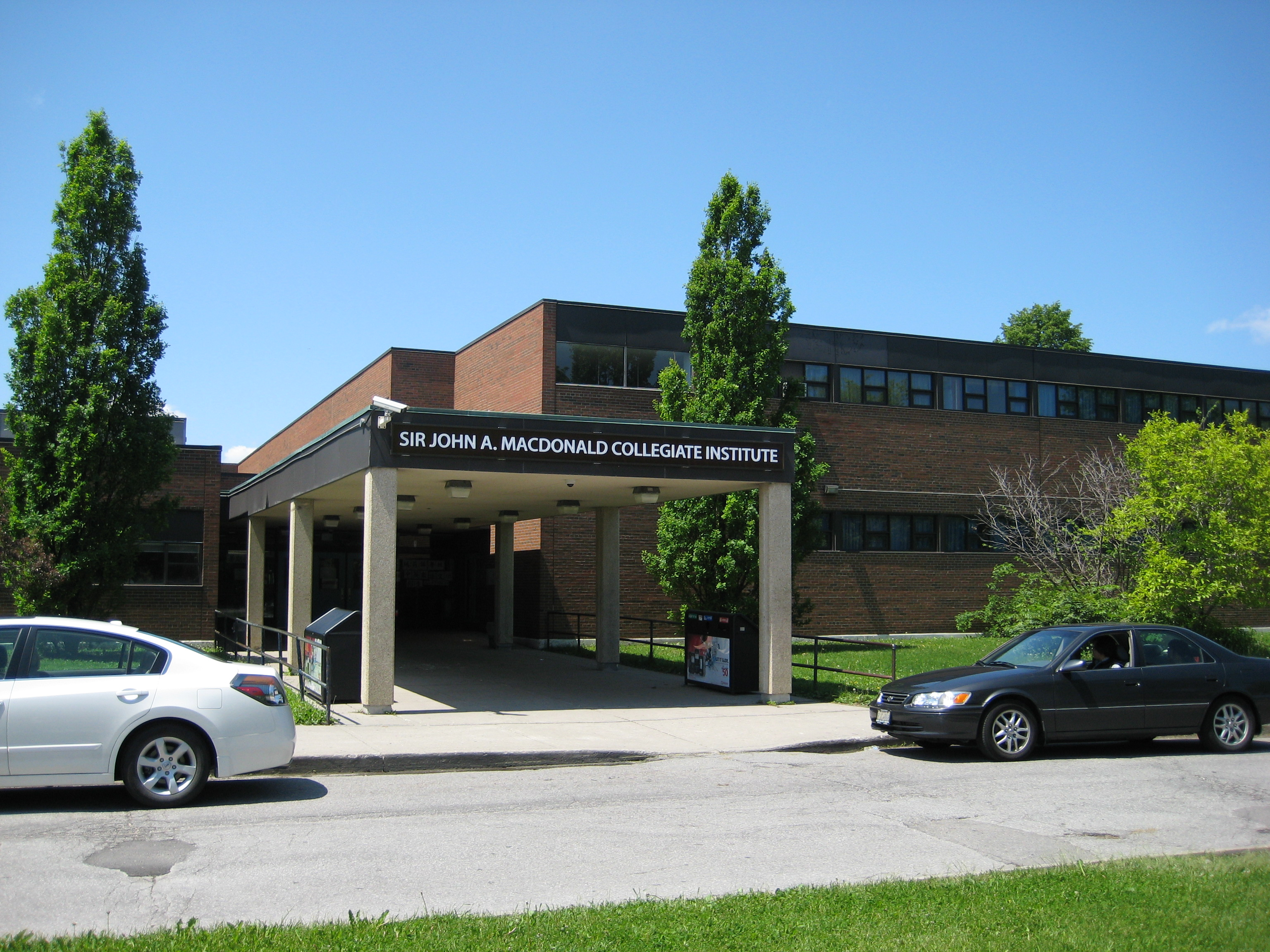
- The front entrance of Sir John A. Macdonald Collegiate Institute

Location
- 2300 Pharmacy Avenue; Toronto, Ontario, M1W 1H8; Canada; 43.786858°N 79.323848°W

Information
- School type: Public High School
- Motto: Prudentia et Scientia (Vision and Knowledge)
- Religious affiliation: Secular
- Founded: 1964
- School board: Toronto District School Board (Scarborough Board of Education)
- Superintendent: Mary Linton
- Area trustee: Manna Wong; Ward 20
- School number: 4154 / 941948
- Administrator: Maria Romano
- Principal: Gregory Foulidis
- Grades: 9-12
- Enrolment: ~900 (2022-2023)
- Language: English
- Schedule type: Semestered
- Campus size: 18.14 acres
- Colours: Red, Purple, and Black
- Mascot: Angus Blackscot
- Team name: Macdonald Blackscots
- Feeder schools: J.B. Tyrrell Sr. Public School; Pleasant View Jr. High School
- Website: schoolweb.tdsb.on.ca/johnamacdonald
- Last updated: April 23, 2025

Sir John A. Macdonald Collegiate Institute is a secondary school in Toronto, Ontario, Canada. It is located in the L'Amoreaux neighbourhood of the former suburb of Scarborough. It is operated by the Toronto District School Board and previously by the Scarborough Board of Education. The school's motto is "Prudentia et Scientia" (Vision and knowledge).

== History ==
Sir John A. Macdonald Collegiate Institute was designed by the architectural firm, Gordon S. Adamson and Associates. The school building, originally named O'Sullivan Secondary School, was constructed in 1963 and opened in the fall of 1964 when there was only farmland around it, and as the population in the area grew, so did the school. During construction, O'Sullivan was renamed to Sir John A. Macdonald Collegiate Institute, after Canada's first prime minister, John A. Macdonald, in which the colours red, black, white and purple were chosen, with the latter colour taken from the $10 Canadian banknote.

As its eleventh collegiate, the school's main building was then extended to have more classrooms, along with larger rooms used for music, art, and autoshop. MacDonald celebrated its 50th year on September 26, 2014.

In 2021, the school board trustees created a committee to evaluate the renaming of schools named for "individuals whose historical legacies no longer represent the values and perspectives of our students and communities". The committee's initial report recommended that three schools, including Sir John A Macdonald Collegiate, should immediately be considered for renaming.

In September 2025, the plans to rename Sir John A. Macdonald Collegiate Institute, as well as two other schools, Ryerson Community School and Dundas Junior Public School were scrapped by the TDSB. This was due to the TDSB being under supervision by the Ontario Provincial Government following investigations into financial mismanagement. Renaming would cost between $30,000 - $60,000 per school and the act was deemed as "wasting resources" by Ontario Education Minister Paul Calandra.

== Notable alumni ==
- Mike Johnson, retired NHL Hockey player (with the Toronto Maple Leafs, Tampa Bay Lightning, Phoenix Coyotes, Montreal Canadiens, and St. Louis Blues)
- David Furnish, filmmaker/director/producer and husband of Elton John
- Neil Crone, actor, comedian, and motivational speaker
- Eric McCormack, actor, producer and musician, star of TV series Will and Grace
- Mike Myers, comedian and Hollywood movie actor (attended Macdonald, but graduated from Stephen Leacock C.I.)
- Duff Gibson, 2006 Winter Olympics gold medalist in singles skeleton; firefighter with Calgary International Airport
- Shaun Chen, former Toronto District School Board Trustee (Ward 21) and current Member of Parliament for Scarborough North
- Michelle MacPherson, 1984 Summer Olympics bronze medalist, 1982 Commonwealth Games double bronze medallist and gold medal relay, swimming
- Brad Park, retired NHL player (with the New York Rangers, Boston Bruins, and Detroit Red Wings), member of the Hockey Hall of Fame; briefly coach with the Red Wings
- Barbara Gowdy, novelist and short story author
- Michael Rudder, Canadian stage, film and voice actor, survived shooting in Mumbai, India
- Mike Levine, bass player for Triumph
- Sherko Haji Rasouli, football player for the BC Lions
- Rod Connop, CFL All-Star and Canadian Football Hall of Fame inductee
- John Anderson, retired NHL hockey player (with the Toronto Maple Leafs, Quebec Nordiques, Hartford Whalers)

== See also ==
- Education in Ontario
- List of secondary schools in Ontario
