= Sir Wilfrid Laurier Collegiate Institute =

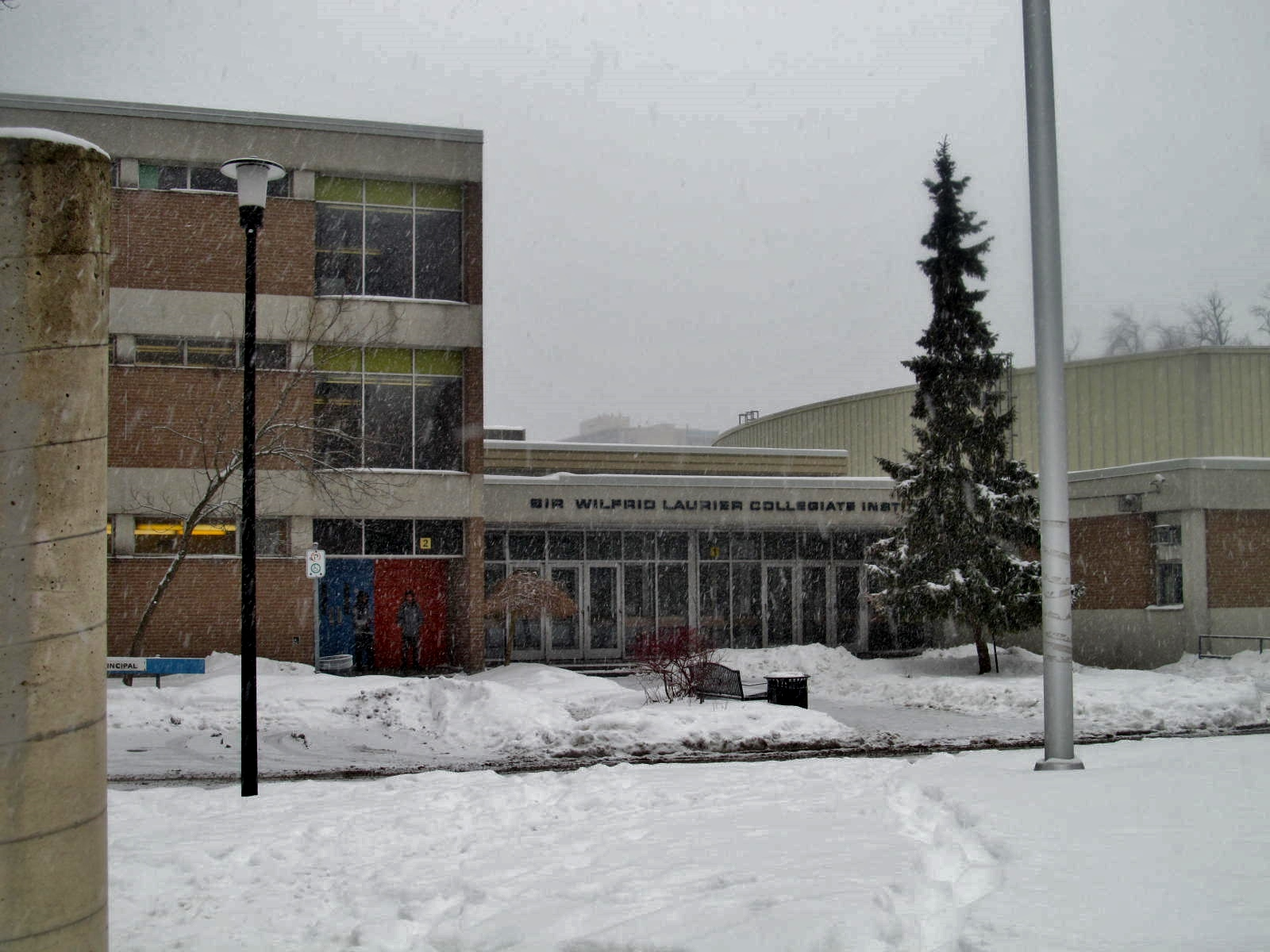
- Sir Wilfrid Laurier C.I. in Winter 2015.

Location
- 145 Guildwood Parkway; Toronto, Ontario, M1E 1P5; Canada; 43°44′51″N 79°11′49″W

Information
- School type: Public high school
- Motto: Hoc Tempus est Tibi (This Time is for You)
- Religious affiliation: Secular
- Founded: 1965
- School board: Toronto District School Board (Scarborough Board of Education)
- Superintendent: Lynn Strangway; LC3, Executive; John Currie; LN16
- Area trustee: Zakir Patel; Ward 19
- School number: 4166 / 942200
- Administrator: Nora-Lynn Trebell; Karen Reynolds
- Principal: Saby Chandi
- Grades: 9-12
- Enrolment: 1427 (2014–15)
- Language: English
- Colours: Grey and Navy
- Mascot: Laurier Blue Devils
- Website: schoolweb.tdsb.on.ca/laurier/

Sir Wilfrid Laurier Collegiate Institute, initially known as Guildwood Secondary School is a high school in Toronto, Ontario, Canada. It is located in the Guildwood neighbourhood in the southern part of the former suburb of Scarborough. It is named in honour of Sir Wilfrid Laurier, the seventh Prime Minister of Canada. The school was established by the Scarborough Board of Education, and is now part of the Toronto District School Board. The motto of the school Hoc Tempus est Tibi which translates into English as "This Time is for You".

== History ==
In 1962, the Scarborough Board of Education acquired the 14.2-acre (5.7 ha) site for Guildwood Secondary School at a cost of $303,751.00. A year later, Guildwood was renamed to Sir Wilfrid Laurier Collegiate Institute, after Canada's seventh prime minister, Sir Wilfrid Laurier.

Construction for Laurier began in 1964 and opened on September 7, 1965, as its twelfth collegiate in Scarborough. The building was designed by architects Hugh L. Allward and George P. Gouinlock with Bennett and Pratt its contractors. The original school building featured 23 standard classrooms, 1 art room, 1 music room, 5 science labs, 1 library, 2 home economics, 1 vocational shop, 3 typing rooms, auditorium, 2 gymnasiums, cafeteria, 2 geography rooms and 1 business machines room.

Additions consisted of a second gymnasium in 1970, academic wing in 1972 and a pool in 1975. The school has a capacity of 1416 students and its enrolment has been rising to the point where the school is slightly over capacity, despite an overall trend in the Toronto District School Board of declining student enrolment. The population is diverse, with about 40% speaking a primary language other than English and 15% having lived in Canada for less than 5 years.

== Academics ==
Laurier's academic reputation has been making progress in the last few years. In 2006, Laurier was recognized for making the greatest progress to its literacy program in Ontario by bringing its literacy rate among its students up 9% to 83%, and in 2007 gained certification as an IB World School. The internationally respected International Baccalaureate Programme is offered to students in their Grade 11 and 12 years, in rough alignment with regular Ontario high school credits allowing students to obtain both an IB Diploma and an OSSD. Students take "Pre-IB" courses in Grade 9 and 10 before entering the IB program in Grade 11. All IB exams are marked internationally by an external marker ensuring consistency among all IB Candidates.

== Notable alumni ==
- Bruce Bell - NHL defenceman for the Quebec Nordiques, St. Louis Blues and New York Rangers.
- Shaquille Murray-Lawrence — Former CFL football player and member of the Canadian four-man bobsled team
- Joel Ward – NHL forward for the Washington Capitals, Nashville Predators and Minnesota Wild.
- Dave Lumley – NHL forward for several Stanley Cup champion Edmonton Oilers teams
- Dianne Buckner – Host of CBC Television's Venture and Dragons' Den
- Denis Simpson – actor and singer. Performed as a member of The Nylons and the TV program the Polka Dot Door.
- Paul Bernardo – serial rapist and murderer
- Carol Klimpel – Olympic swimmer
- Daniel Mullings – basketball player
- Lee Fairclough – MPP, Etobicoke—Lakeshore

== See also ==
- Education in Ontario
- List of secondary schools in Ontario
