= Cedarbrae Collegiate Institute =

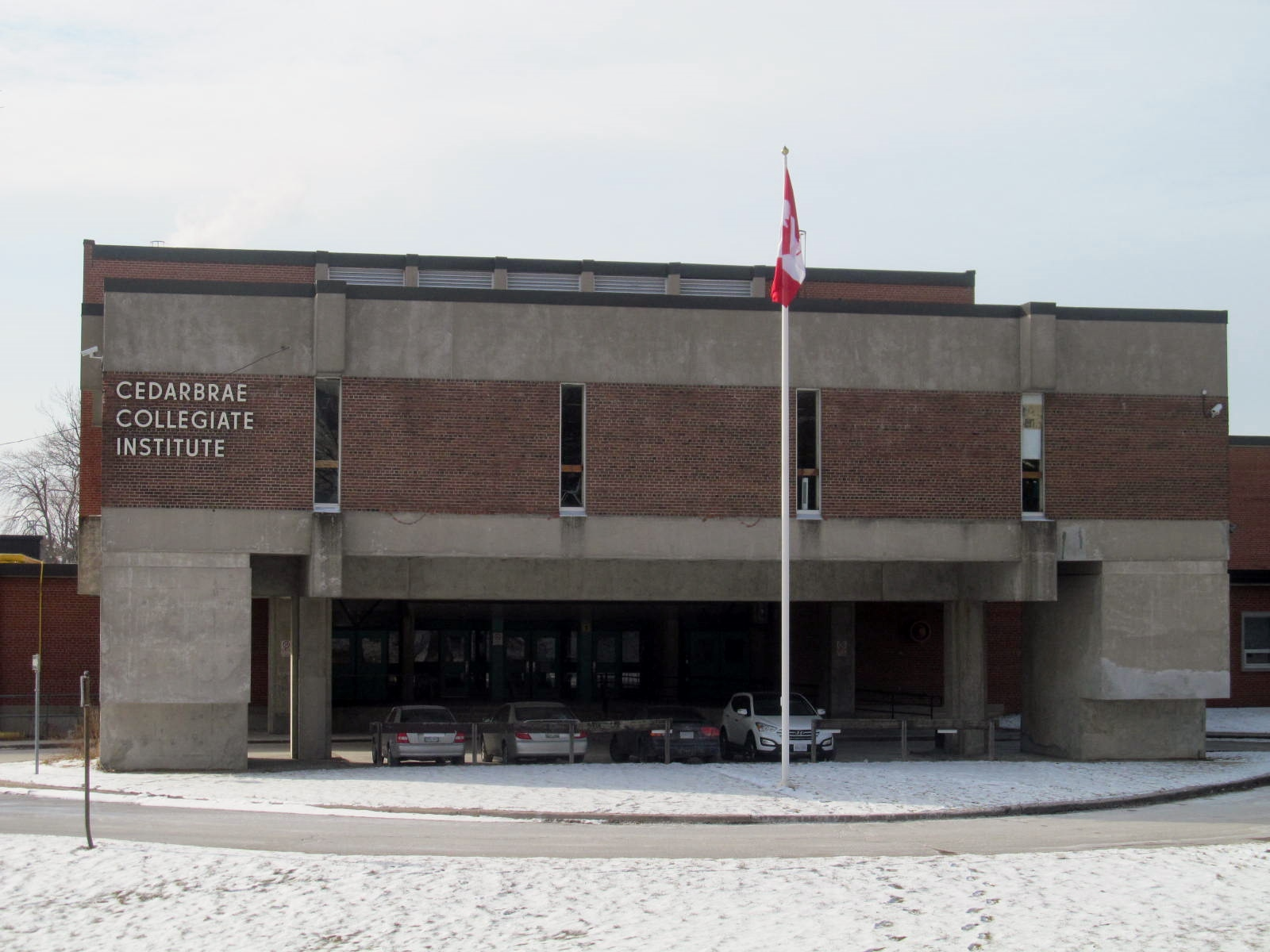
- The front entrance to the school with the library addition.

Location
- 550 Markham Road; Toronto, Ontario, M1H 2A2; Canada; 43°45′23″N 79°13′33″W

Information
- Former name: Cedarbrae Secondary School
- School type: Public High School
- Motto: Hic Patet Ingeniis Campus (Here is a place where you can develop your talents)
- Religious affiliation: Secular
- Founded: 1961
- Status: Active
- School board: Toronto District School Board (Scarborough Board of Education)
- Superintendent: Sheryl Robinson Petrazzini; LN15
- Area trustee: Zakir Patel; Ward 19
- School number: 4124 / 899178
- Administrator: Sandy Koster
- Principal: Tasneem Munir
- Grades: 9-12
- Enrolment: 1117 (2019-2020)
- Language: English/French
- Schedule type: Semestered
- Area: Scarborough
- Colours: Green, Blue, and White
- Mascot: Cedric the Colt
- Team name: Cedarbrae Colts; Cedarbrae Dolphins (Swim Team)
- Website: www.cedarbraeci.com

Cedarbrae Collegiate Institute (CCI or Cedarbrae CI), formerly Cedarbrae Secondary School is a semestered public secondary school in Toronto, Ontario, Canada. It is located in the Woburn neighbourhood in former suburb of Scarborough. It was established in 1961 by the Scarborough Board of Education and since 1998 operated by the Toronto District School Board.

The school serves immersion and extended French students and houses approximately 2343 students as of October 2024. The school's motto is "Hic Patet Ingeniis Campus" which means Here is a place where you can develop your talents.

== History ==
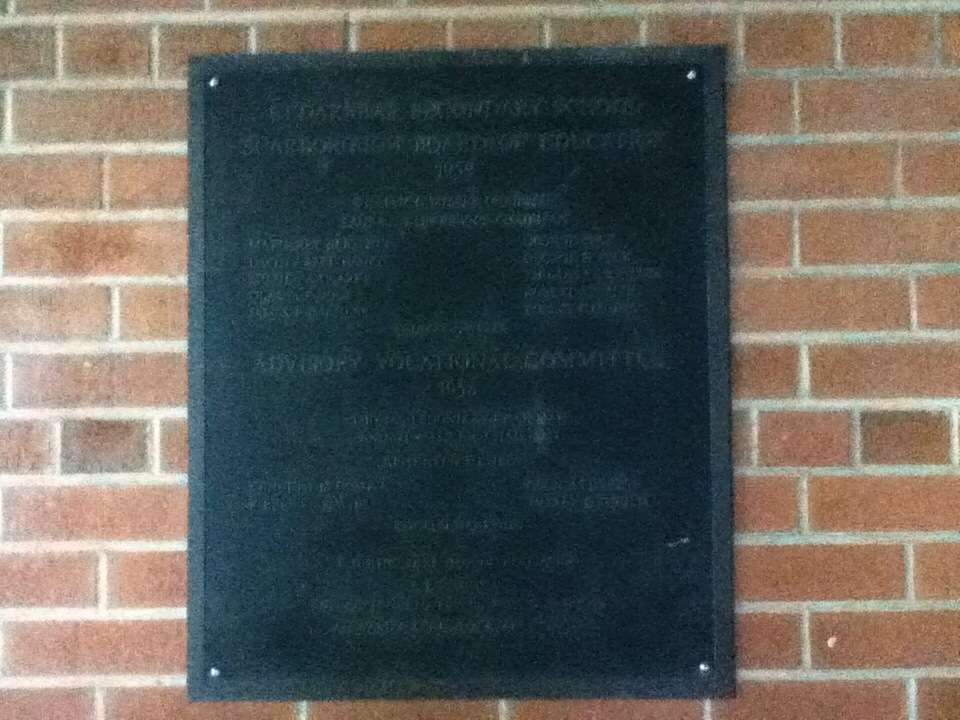
The wall plaque for Cedarbrae S.S. dated 1958.

Cedarbrae Secondary School was granted by the then-Scarborough Board of Education in 1958 at a cost of over $3,500,000 on the hillside overlooking the site of Peter Secor's grist mill of 1830, on the west side of the Markham Road. Architects Hugh L. Allward and George Roper Gouinlock (son of prominent architect George Wallace Gouinlock) was commissioned for the Cedarbrae project.

The building was built in 1959 opened for classes in September 1961 as Scarborough's seventh collegiate as well as the first composite hybrid academic and vocational high school. Cedarbrae was built to ease overcrowding at R. H. King Collegiate Institute, West Hill Collegiate Institute and the two-year-old David and Mary Thomson Collegiate Institute. John Grabb served as its founding principal and Francis S. Jennings was its inaugural vice-principal. The school adopted its present name Cedarbrae Collegiate Institute later on. The building was originally built a two storey configuration in the southern end but the third floor was constructed in 1965 and an enlarged library covering the original entrance along with the sets of elevators were added later on.

Cedarbrae C.I. celebrated its 25th anniversary in 1986 and its 50th anniversary on May 27, 2011.

The school was featured in the 1999 film Detroit Rock City.

== Campus ==
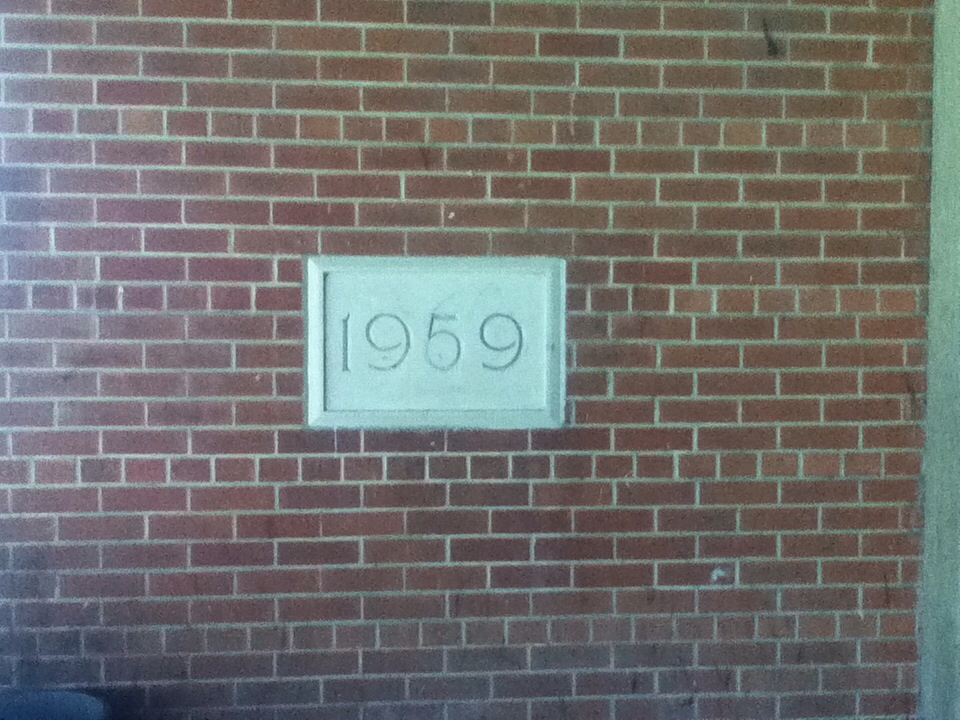
The "1959" datestone for Cedarbrae S.S.

The school is by area the largest in Scarborough consisting of 16 acres (6.5 ha) located on Markham Road, south of Lawrence Ave, north of Eglinton Ave and one of the largest schools by area in the former Scarborough Board of Education (the other being Woburn, David and Mary Thomson, Albert Campbell and Midland Avenue). The 254,765-square-foot (23,668 m^{2}) facility includes 48 conventional classrooms, eight science laboratories, a large gymnasium which can be partitioned into three smaller gymnasiums, a pool, 2 automotive technology shops, 2 wood shops, a film studio, a fitness room and dance studio next to it located above the gym, a cafeteria with a serving room on the southwestern side, 2 home economics classrooms, the main and guidance offices on the north, and a library (Howard R. Campbell Resource Centre) on the third floor of the main building. Cedarbrae also has a 400m track behind the school facing west and is one of the few schools in Toronto which still has a performance theatre stage in its auditorium which was named "John Grabb Theatre" after its founding principal.

Cedarbrae also has a unique layout in which the Technology Department is separated form the rest of the school. Cedarbrae is located on a hill-like landscape which causes the schools' two wings to be at different elevations; because of this the academic wing (Markham Road and Eastpark Boulevard) is known as floors 1, 2, and 3 (that wing was originally built as two floors), while the technology wing (Markham Road and Greencedar Circuit) is known as floors 4 and 5. Connecting both these wings is the main building which has the foyer, offices, gyms, pool, cafeteria, staff room, some classrooms, caretaking/receiving, and the library. Lockers are usually painted aqua green, silver, yellow, red, or blue depending on their location in the building. The school has 14 fire exits.

== Specialty programs ==
=== Immersion and Extended French ===
The immersion and extended French programs give enrolled students a chance to broaden their learning of French as a second language but must remain in their chosen program until graduation to maintain status. Cedarbrae requires students enrolled in such programs to exhibit good attendance and a good academic performance or will risk being dismissed from the program.

Immersion students require 11 French credits in order to receive their Honours Certificate of Bilingual Studies in French Immersion. Extended French students require 8 French credits to receive their Honours Certificate of Bilingual Studies in Extended French. French credits can be obtained by taking available courses in French such as: French, Geography, Gym, Art, History, Math (immersion), and Civics & Careers.

=== Special Arts ===
Starting in grade 9, students will study in depth how the elements and principles of design are applied to various art forms. In this program, students study the ideas, techniques, and attitudes of the professional artist by learning how to use the tools of the trade such as current computer hardware and software in courses like "Computers in Art".

Students who wish to enrol in Cedarbrae's Special Art Program must complete an admission test, provide a letter of recommendation from an art teacher, and submit a copy of their transcript to student services.

== In the news ==
=== June 23, 2010 fire ===
At approximately 10:30 pm June 23, 2010, emergency crews responded to a fire in the office area of the school. A young man was charged, with reports that he was a former student. The fire resulted in the postponement of final exams scheduled for June 24.

=== February 5, 2020 school shooting ===
Cedarbrae Collegiate Institute in Scarborough was placed on lockdown after a shooting in the area. The lockdown was lifted late Wednesday afternoon.

Around 1:11 p.m., Toronto police received multiple reports of gunshots heard near the school at Markham Road and Lawrence Avenue East.

== Notable alumni ==
- Jermaine Gabriel, CFL player for the Toronto Argonauts
- Brent Imlach, NHL hockey player
- Paul Lawless, former NHL player
- Carole Pope, lead singer of Rough Trade
- Craig Russell, performer and female impersonator
- Natalie Spooner, Canadian Women's Ice Hockey Gold Medalist
- Michael Wincott, actor
- Jeff Wincott, actor, producer, and writer
- Dahrran Diedrick, CFL Player

== See also ==
- Education in Ontario
- List of secondary schools in Ontario
