= St. Joan of Arc Catholic Academy =

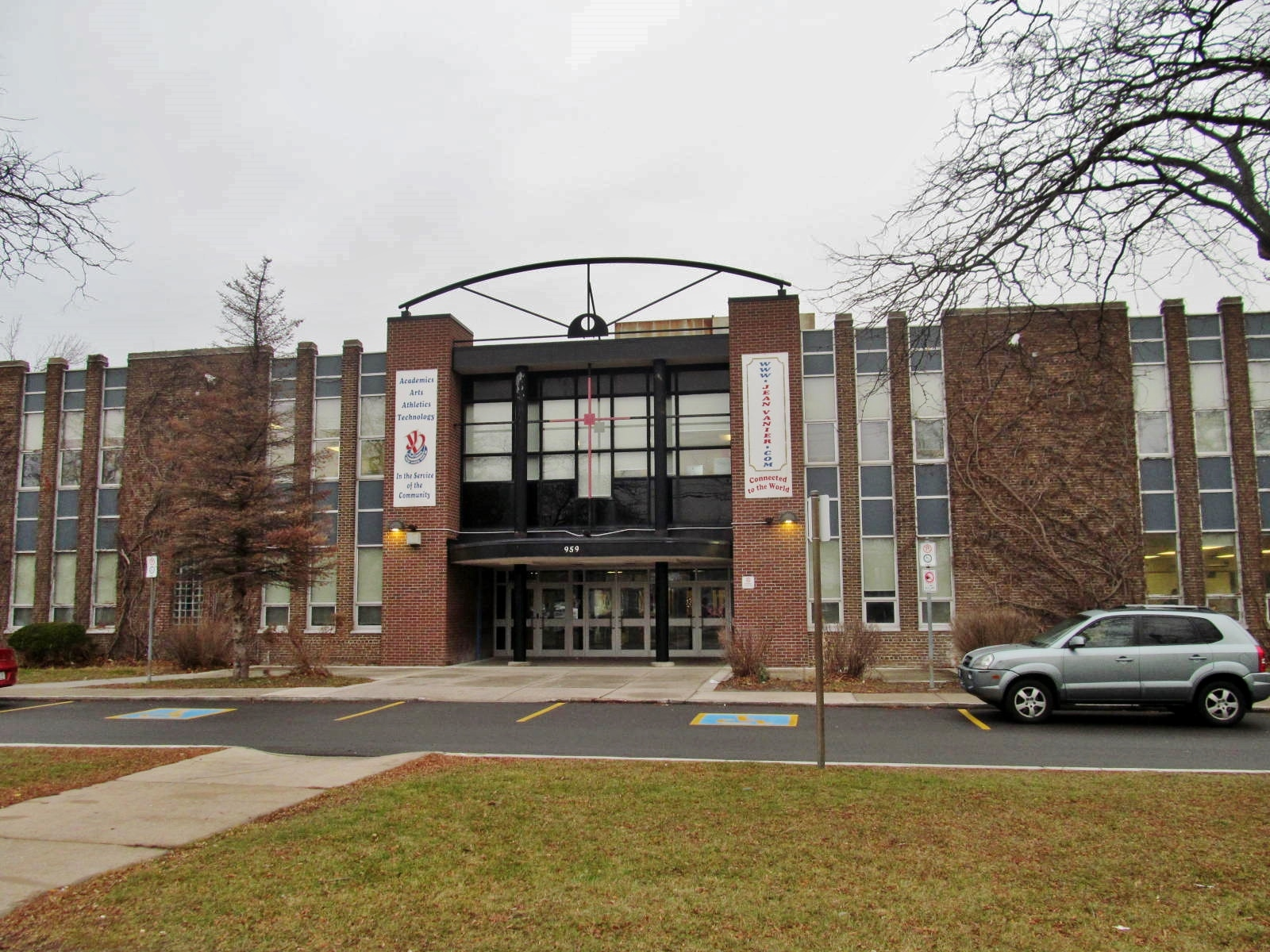
- St. Joan of Arc C.A., then known as Jean Vanier C.S.S, in the former Tabor Park building, pictured in 2014.

Location
- 959 Midland Avenue; Knob Hill, Toronto, Ontario, M1K 4G4; Canada; 43°44′17″N 79°15′32″W

Information
- Former name: Jean Vanier Catholic Secondary School (1989–2020)
- School type: Bill 30 Catholic High School
- Motto: Minds to Reason, Hands to Work, Hearts for God
- Founded: 1989
- School board: Toronto Catholic District School Board (Metropolitan Separate School Board)
- Superintendent: Peter Aguiar; Area 7
- Area trustee: Mike Del Grande; Ward 7
- School number: 554 / 723428
- Principal: Vesna Filiplic
- Faculty: 101
- Grades: 9–12
- Enrolment: 801 (2022–23)
- Language: English
- Colours: Navy Blue, Light Blue and Silver
- Slogan: Academics • Arts • Athletics • Technology; In the Service of the Community
- Mascot: March the Maverick
- Team name: St. Joan of Arc Mavericks
- Affiliation: Roman Catholic
- Parish: St. Maria Goretti
- Specialist High Skills Major: Arts & Culture; Health & Wellness; Information and Communications Technology; Non-Profit; Transportation
- Program Focus: Advanced Placement; Broad-based Technology
- Website: www.tcdsb.org/schools/stjoanofarc/

St. Joan of Arc Catholic Academy, formerly known as Jean Vanier Catholic Secondary School, is a Roman Catholic separate high school in the Eglinton East neighbourhood of Scarborough in Toronto, Ontario, Canada. It is a member of the Toronto Catholic District School Board (formerly the Metropolitan Separate School Board).

The school building originally opened in 1965 as Tabor Park Vocational School (1965–1986) under the Scarborough Board of Education, which later became part of the Toronto District School Board. The board has leased the building to the MSSB/TCDSB since 1989.

The school educates 1,002 students as of the 2016–17 academic year, and it is ranked 331 out of 725 schools in the Fraser Institute report card. Its motto is Minds to Reason, Hands to Work, Hearts for God.

Previously, the school was named after Jean Vanier, the founder of L'Arche in 1964. The school was renamed in July 2020 in honor of St. Joan of Arc after posthumous sexual abuse allegations against Vanier.

The logo as Jean Vanier C.S.S. from 1989 to 2020

== History ==
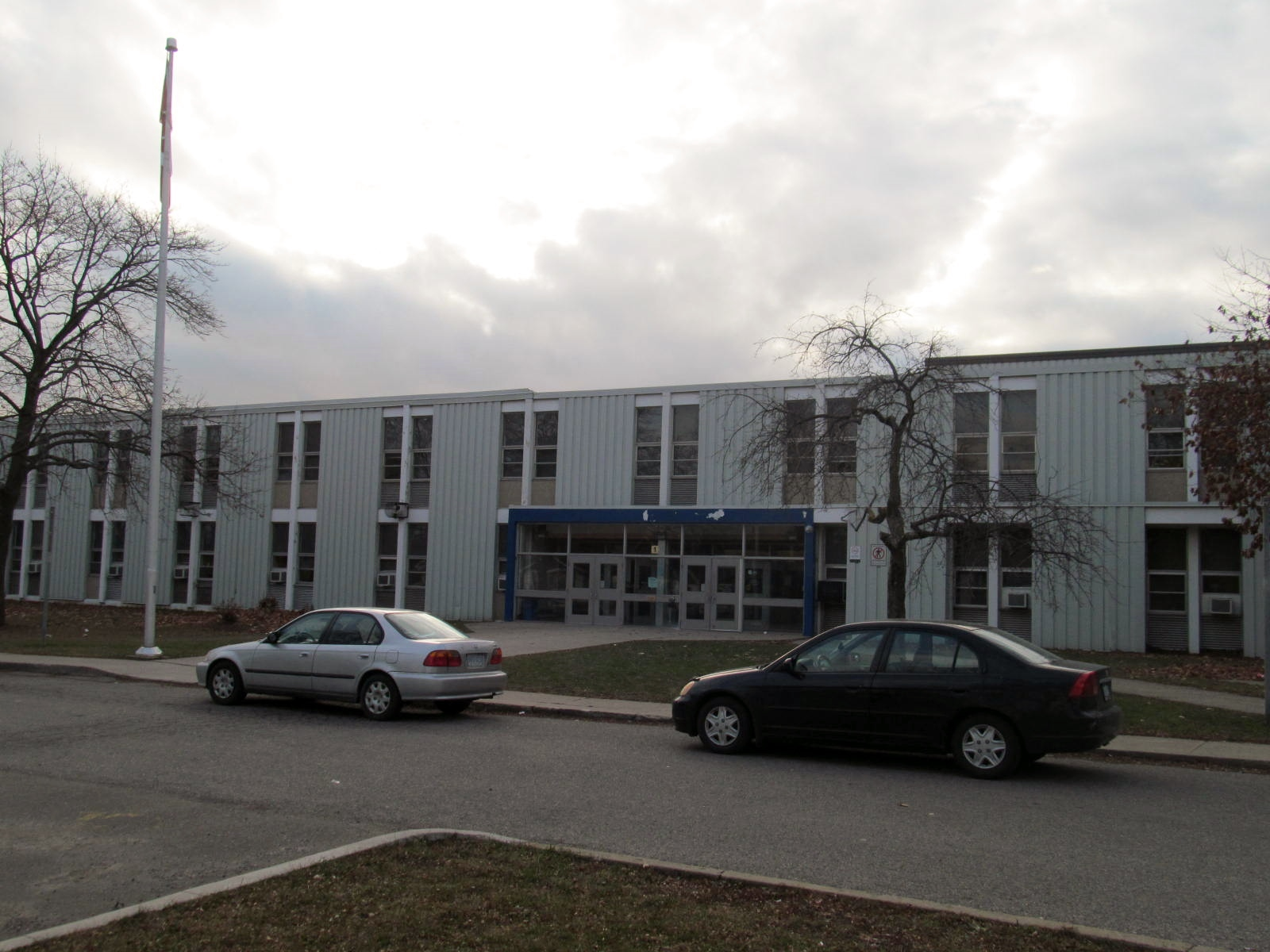
Jean Vanier attempted to merge with Cardinal Newman in June 2000 at the former home of Midland Avenue Collegiate Institute, but the plans never came to fruition.

=== Jean Vanier Catholic Secondary School (1989–2020) ===
The original school on the property, Tabor Park Vocational School, was built in 1964 and established by the Scarborough Board of Education in September 1965 as a less academically challenging high school. However, Tabor Park closed in 1986 due to low enrollment. As a result of public funding of Catholic high schools, in May 1988, the SBE leased the Tabor Park property, which was reopened and named after Jean Vanier, the Canadian philosopher and founder of L'Arche, to serve the rest of Scarborough.

=== St. Joan of Arc Catholic Academy (2020-present) ===
An internal report by L'Arche in February 2020 concluded that Jean Vanier had engaged in "manipulative and emotionally abusive" sexual relationships with six women in Trosly-Breuil, France between 1970 and 2005. A Change.org petition set up by a former student called for Jean Vanier's name to be removed.

At a school board meeting on July 16, 2020, the TCDSB recommended the name St. Joan of Arc Catholic Academy for the 2020–21 school year. The school formally completed its renaming at the end of August 2020. With the COVID-19 pandemic affecting Toronto, the school reopened under its new name the following September.

The current emblem retains the cross from the previous Vanier insignia, now sporting a fleur-de-lis with a sword standing in the centre.

== Overview ==
The school has a large athletic field, found in most regular public high schools, but usually unavailable at purpose-built Catholic high Schools. The design of the former Tabor Park school features brown brick and an overall structure in the middle, where the quadrangle/courtyard stands. The two catwalks, along with 20 new academic classrooms, a seminar work room, and an exercise room, were eventually added in 1991 to expand enrolment. as well as black cross was retrofitted in the centre. Other features in the leased 126,241 sq. ft. facility include 28 academic classrooms, two automotive shops, four state-of-the-art science labs, three computer labs, two Mac labs, a visual arts studio, cafetorium, library, expanded ME/DD classroom, a double gymnasia that can be split into two, a drama room, two music rooms, a photography room, guidance area, a recently renovated home economics room and a chapel.

=== Arts ===
On March 6, 2014, Vanier was selected for the MusiCounts Band Aid Grant program costing at $600,000. The school received their $10,000 in equipment for the drum line program such as the marimba and a complete set of cymbals. The guests were Juno Award-winning musicians Classified and David Myles who also performed their single Inner Ninja live in front of 300 students.

== Notable alumni ==
- Vijay Thanigasalam - politician, incumbent MPP for Scarborough—Rouge Park (attended 2003–2007).
- Angela Wong - 2018 Miss Chinese Toronto Pageant Miss Congeniality winner (attended 2008–2012).

== See also ==
- Education in Ontario
- List of secondary schools in Ontario
- Scarborough Centre for Alternative Studies
- Tabor Park Vocational School
- Jean Vanier
- Faith and Light
