= Maplewood High School (Toronto) =

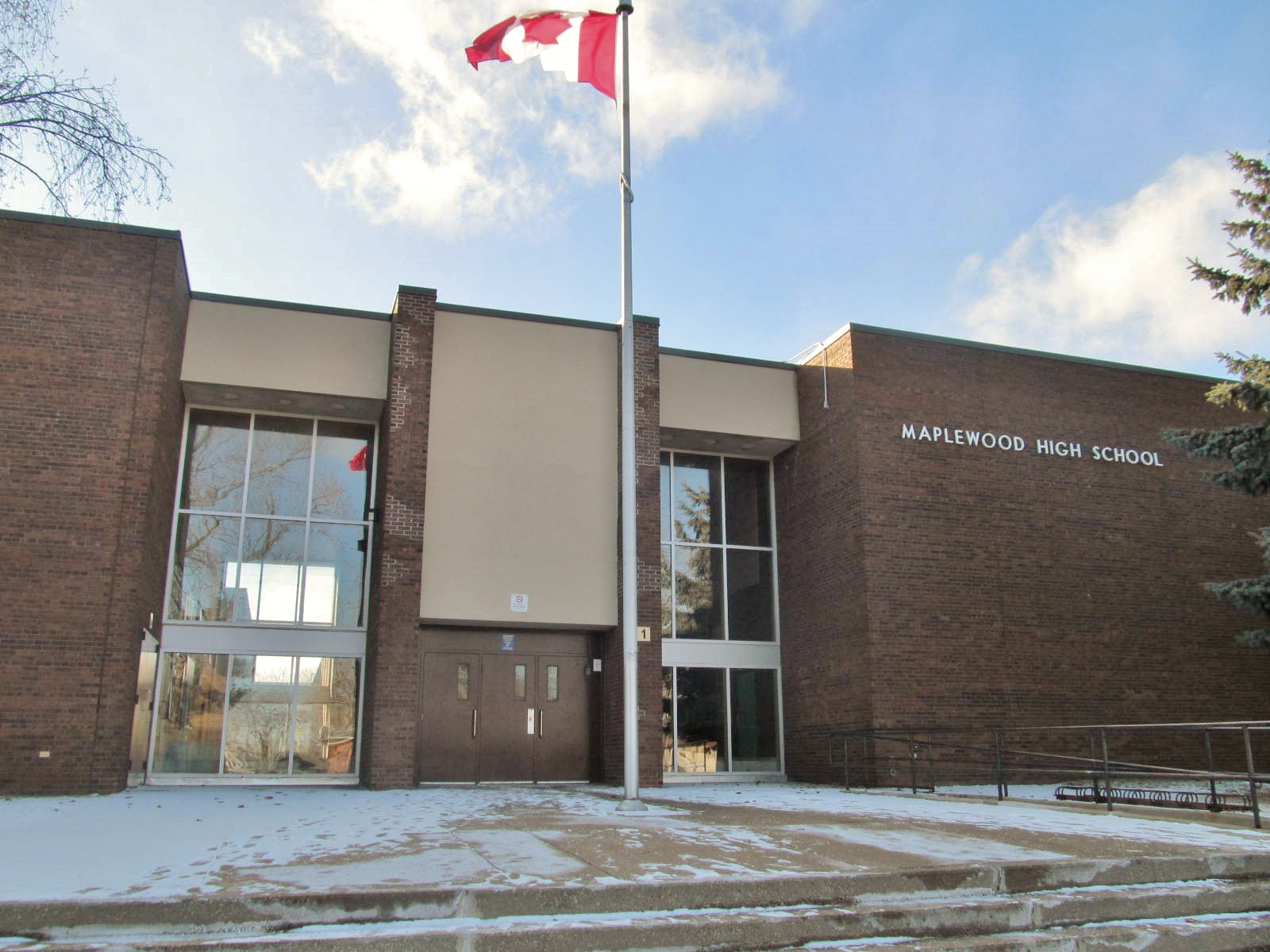

Location
- 120 Galloway Road; West Hill, Toronto, Ontario, M1E 1W7; Canada; 43.7601°N 79.1939°W

Information
- Former name: Maplewood Vocational School
- School type: Vocational school Public high school
- Motto: Building Futures
- Religious affiliation: Secular
- Established: 1967
- School board: Toronto District School Board (Scarborough Board of Education)
- Superintendent: Jason Kandankery
- Area trustee: Zakir Patel; Ward 19
- School number: 4136 / 924695
- Principal: Andrea Parise, Vice Principal(s) Andaluza Nagy; Ken Mulgrew
- Grades: 9-12
- Enrolment: 292 (2012-2013)
- Language: English
- Colours: Green and gold
- Team name: Maplewood Wolverines
- Public transit access: TTC: West/East: 86 Scarborough; Rapid Transit/Train: Kennedy
- Website: schoolweb.tdsb.on.ca/maplewood/

Maplewood High School (locally known as Maplewood HS, MHS, or Maplewood), formerly Maplewood Vocational School is a specialized public vocational high school managed by the Scarborough Board of Education when it was passed on to the Toronto District School Board upon amalgamation in 1998. The school was founded in 1967 as the second junior vocational school in the former City of Scarborough.

The school offers basic academic and vocational courses with graduates entering post-secondary programs such as college or employment. Maplewood's school motto is Building Futures.

== History ==
Maplewood Vocational School was established on September 5, 1967, using the facilities of Tabor Park Vocational School until the permanent building on a 12-acre property was erected and completed in 1968. The two-storey school is designed by the architects Webb, Zerafa and Menkes.

The school celebrated its 50th anniversary on October 21, 2017.

== Campus ==
Maplewood High School is a two-storey 115,477 square feet (10,728.2 m^{2}) building with 12 classrooms, one science lab, five ME/DD (multiple exceptionality/developmentally delayed) classrooms, library, double gymnasium, cafetorium, home economics room, vocational shops for automotive and motor service with paint booth, construction, welding, greenhouse, woodworking, textile, merchandising, assembly and production, bakery, quantity cooking, short order and arts room.

The building's layout from above has the shape of an "M" due to the two court yards from the gymnasium. The elevator was installed in 2019 to connect the academic building on the second floor with the wing from rooms S20 to S23. Hallway lockers are colored teal green and blue. It has 7 fire exits.

== Programs ==
=== Academics ===
The school offers grades 9 to 12 in a semester system. It offers basic academic programs for special-needs students with potential knowledge and skills required for work and independent living. The courses consist of English, math, history, geography, science, and law curriculum.

=== Vocational ===
Maplewood offers technical and vocational programs including cosmetology, business and computer studies, home economics, parenting, sewing, integrated technology, construction, transportation, horticulture, maintenance, communications tech and woodworking.

Most notably, the food services program runs a professional kitchen and bake shop. Up-to-date equipment is used every day by Maplewood Food School to feed enough students in the cafeteria. Students learn how to work in the hospitality industry by gaining skills that are needed in catering, food preparation and baking. Some of its senior students earn the Food Handler Certificate.

=== Other ===
All students in Maplewood participate in the Transition to Work program, in which students gain the employability skills necessary for the world of work through in-school co-op courses and co-op opportunities in the community.

Co-curricular activities meet the diverse needs and interests of the Maplewood student body. Students can choose from any number of clubs in the area of arts, music, dance, fitness and sport. Competitive intramural sports feature interschool leagues and tournaments in team and individual sports.

The school is involved in charitable causes by participating in the Terry Fox Run, the Autism Walk, Special Olympics, Haiti Relief Efforts and the Hospital for Sick Children.

==== Sports ====
- Volleyball
- Basketball
- Badminton
- Soccer,
- Cross-country running
- Dodge-ball
- Track & field
- Softball
- Floor hockey

==== Co-curricular activities ====
- Student Council
- Hip Hop
- Belly Dancing
- Drum
- Band
- Choir
- Sewing
- Pottery
- Guitar
- Anime

== See also ==
- List of high schools in Ontario
