= Albert Campbell Collegiate Institute =

High school in Toronto, Ontario, Canada

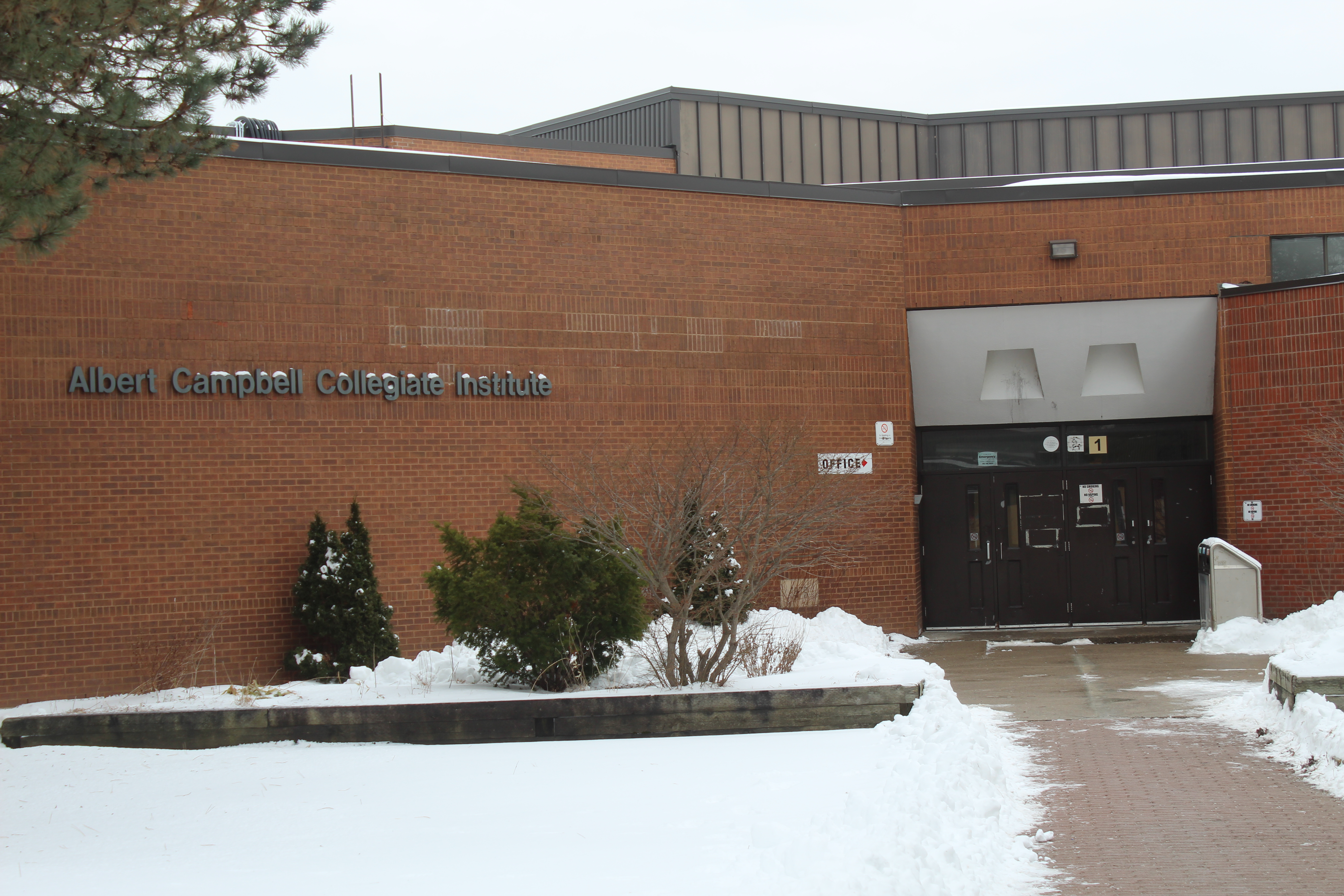

Location
- 1550 Sandhurst Circle; Toronto, Ontario, M1V 1S6; Canada; 43°48′33″N 79°16′19″W

Information
- School type: High school
- Motto: "Ne Obliviscaris" (Forget Not)
- Founded: 1976
- School board: Toronto District School Board (Scarborough Board of Education)
- Superintendent: Brendan Browne; LC3, Executive; Diana Panagiotopoulos; LN17
- Area trustee: Yalini Rajakulasingam; Ward 21
- Principal: Icilda Elliston
- Grades: 9-12
- Enrolment: approx. 1219 (2017-18)
- Language: English
- Colours: Maroon and Black
- Mascot: Boar
- Team name: Campbell Celts
- Website: schoolweb.tdsb.on.ca/albertcampbell/

Albert Campbell Collegiate Institute (Albert Campbell CI, ACCI or Campbell), initially intended to be known as Sir William Osler Collegiate Institute is a public high school in Toronto, Ontario, Canada. It is located in the former suburb of Scarborough. The school was opened in 1976 by the Scarborough Board of Education.

The school has a full range of programs and extra-curricular activities to provide all students with the Albert Campbell Experience: Academics, Community and Engagement. It is named after former Scarborough politician and mayor Albert McTaggart Campbell.

== History ==
In its conception, the school was originally to be named Sir William Osler Collegiate Institute, but it was changed to Albert Campbell, the former mayor of Scarborough, resulting in the name Albert Campbell Collegiate Institute. Another school was built which eventually gave the name Sir William Osler High School.

The school, at the cost of $5,658,304.00, was constructed in 1975 and opened its doors on September 7, 1976, as its seventeenth collegiate in the former City of Scarborough. The building was designed by Japanese Canadian architect Raymond Moriyama, who built Ontario buildings such as the Ontario Science Centre, Toronto Reference Library and the North York Central Library. Renovations were completed in the late 1980s and additions added in the early 1990s. When others schools were being built, Albert Campbell served as a temporary school for other regions.

== Overview ==
=== Campus ===
Albert Campbell is 251,024 square feet in size, sitting on 16 acres of land, making it the second-largest High School in Scarborough (the largest is Cedarbrae Collegiate Institute). As an open-concept, two-story school, ACCI features over 80 classrooms; ten science labs; three music rooms (with keyboard lab); a black box drama room; four art rooms; two dark rooms (one for tech, one for art); ten computer labs; six tech rooms (auto shop, construction, communication, computer, technological design and green industries); a large forum; a cafetorium with a stage, four gymnasiums, and an activity gym (the larger of which can be portioned into two gymnasiums); a 25m swimming pool, a weight room located above gym four; main and guidance offices located in the forum (guidance and main office are separated). The main forum area is the focal point of the school, with over 80 world flags hanging from the ceiling rafters. The school has a 400m race track, a football/soccer field, and a baseball diamond outside. ACCI is also equipped with 12 fire exits.

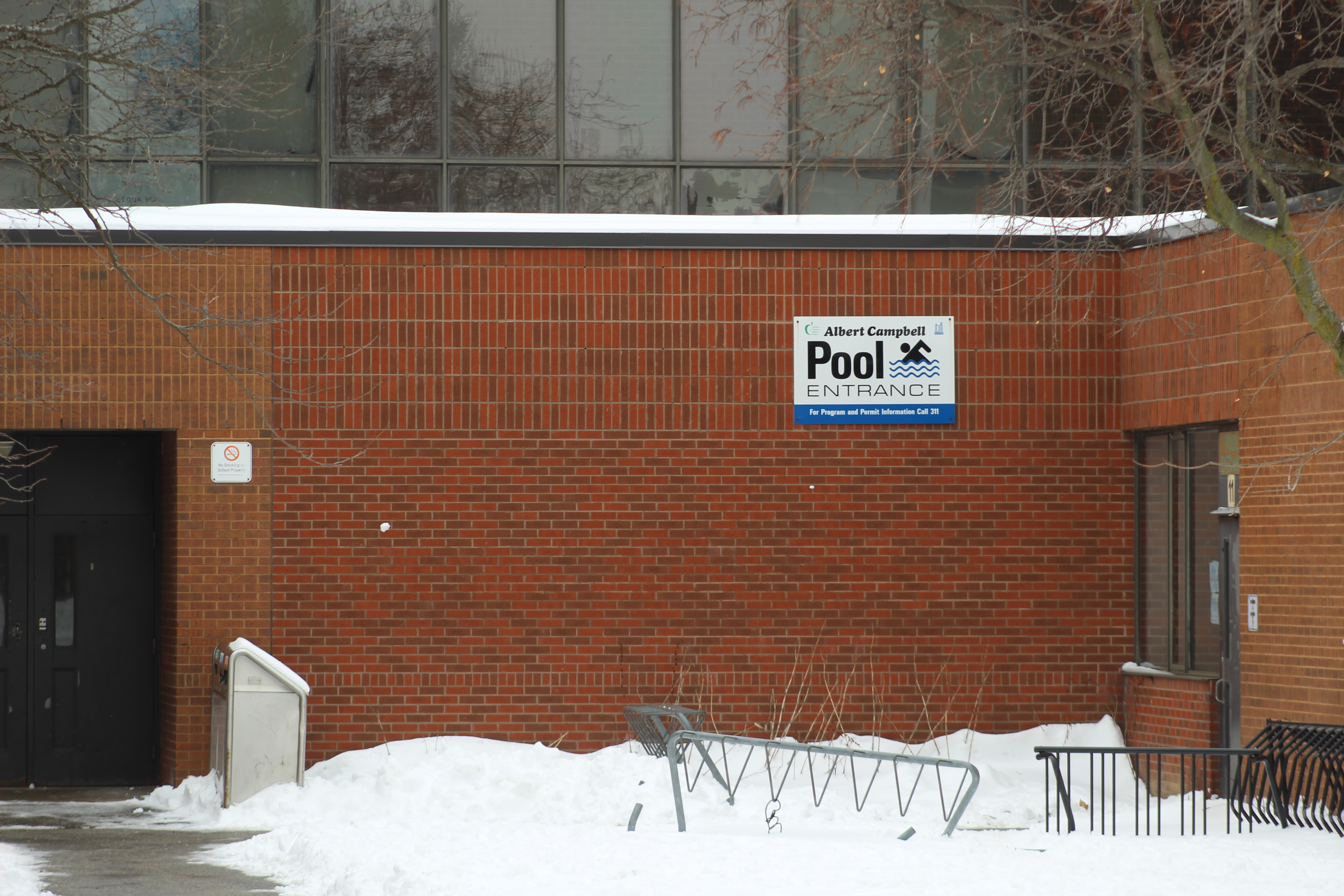
Albert Campbell features a swimming pool.

== Notable alumni ==
- Andrea Constand - Former director of operations of Temple University women's basketball team
- Sunny Fong - Canadian designer, Winner of Project Runway Canada Season 2
- Cherie Piper - Member of the Canada women's national ice hockey team, gold medalist in 2002, 2006, and 2010 Olympics.
- Mark Taylor - Canadian actor Instant Star, Flashpoint
- Genelle Williams - Canadian actor Warehouse 13, Bitten (TV series), Bitten (TV series)
- Matthew "Wardell" Yu - Professional eSports Athlete (Valorant ), who played for Team Solomid's Pro Valorant team.

== See also ==
- Education in Ontario
- List of secondary schools in Ontario
