= Sir William Osler High School =

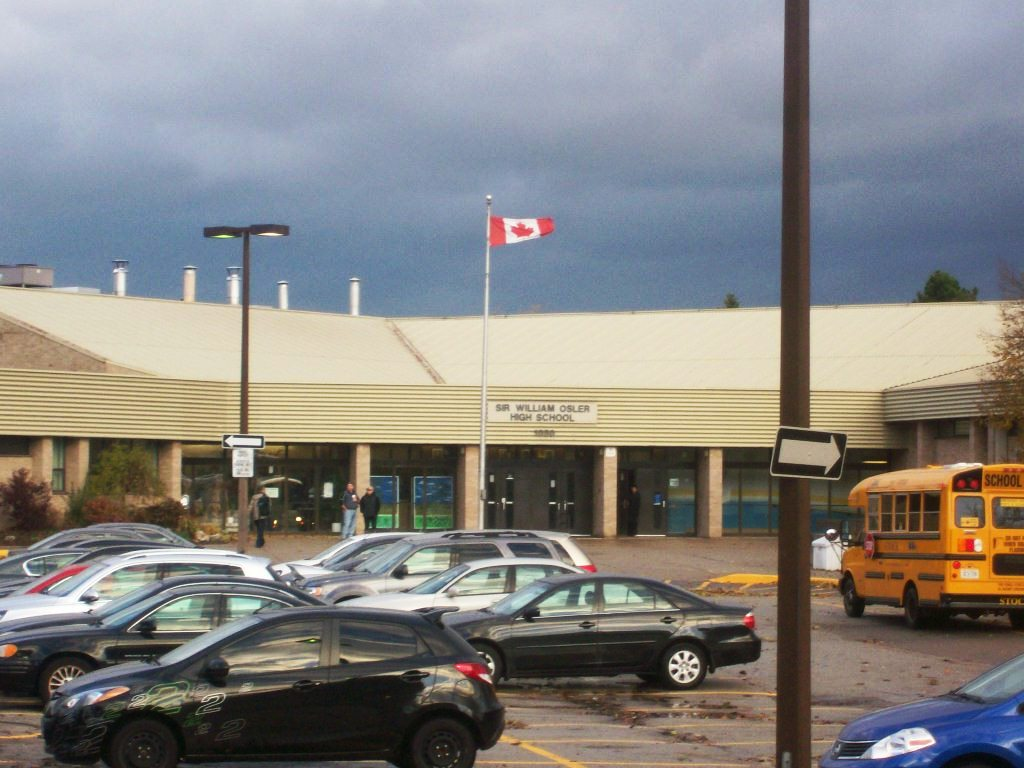

Location
- 1050 Huntingwood Drive; Toronto, Ontario, M1S 3H5; Canada
- 43.796934°N 79.285895°W

Information
- Type: Public, High School Vocational High School
- Motto: Powerful, Passionate, Progressive
- Established: 1974
- School district: Toronto District School Board
- Principal: Mr.Ian Bain
- Grades: 9-12
- Enrolment: 201 (2018-2019)
- Colors: Blue and Yellow
- Mascot: Osler Eagles
- Website: schoolweb.tdsb.on.ca/sirwilliamosler/Home.aspx

Sir William Osler High School (SWOHS), formerly Sir William Osler Vocational school is a small specialized public vocational high school in Toronto, Ontario, Canada. Located in the former suburb of Scarborough, it opened in 1975, and is named after Sir William Osler, a Canadian doctor and medical educator. Albert Campbell Collegiate Institute located northeast of Osler was initially named as Sir William Osler Collegiate Institute. Sir William Osler is now a congregated school for students with mild intellectual disabilities and developmental disabilities. Class sizes are small, and heavily supported with teachers, educational assistants and child and youth workers.

== Notable faculty ==
- Joseph Valtellini

== See also ==
- Education in Ontario
- List of secondary schools in Ontario
