= Timothy Eaton Business and Technical Institute =

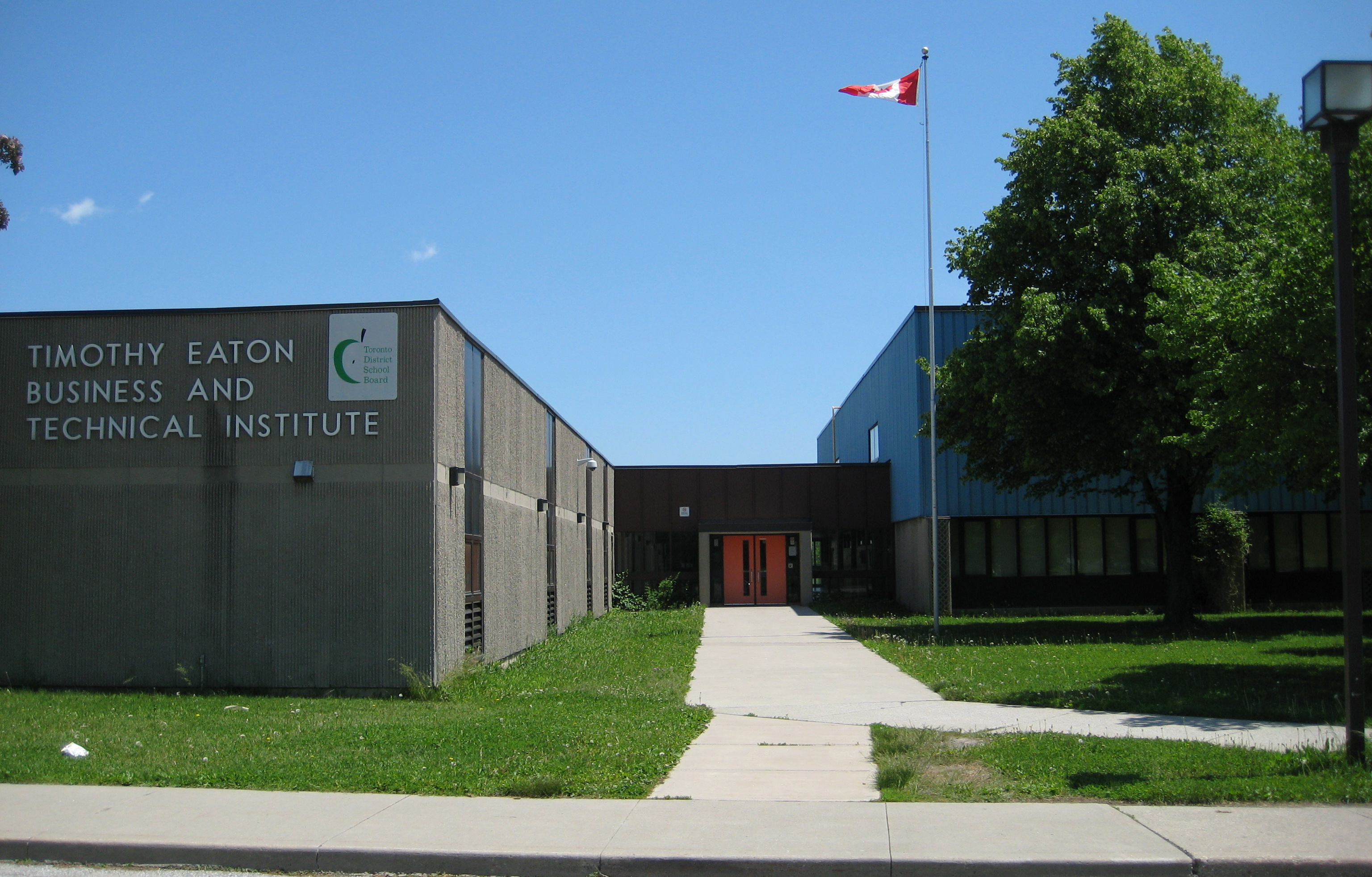
- Timothy Eaton B.T.I. in 2009.

Location
- 1251 Bridletowne Circle; Toronto, Ontario, M1W 1S7; Canada; 43.79393°N 79.31084°W

Information
- Former name: Timothy Eaton Secondary School (1971-1987)
- School type: Public, High school Vocational High school
- Motto: Vincit Omnia Veritas (Truth conquers all things)
- Founded: 1971
- Status: Demolished c. 2014
- Closed: 2009
- School board: Toronto District School Board (Scarborough Board of Education)
- Oversight: Toronto Lands Corporation
- Superintendent: Marc Sprack; LN09
- Area trustee: Manna Wong; Ward 20
- School number: 4220 / 948608
- Principal: Megan Bradshaw
- Grades: 9-13
- Enrollment: 272 (2008-09)
- Language: English
- Colours: Maroon and Black
- Team name: Eaton Razorbacks (1971-1991); Eaton Huskies (1992-2009)

Timothy Eaton Business and Technical Institute, formerly Timothy Eaton Secondary School is a defunct high school in the L'Amoreaux area of Toronto, Ontario, Canada originally operated by the Scarborough Board of Education. The school was named after Timothy Eaton, the founder of the now-defunct Eaton's department store chain.

The school closure was justified by declining enrolment with 230 students in the final year. Remaining students were sent to Bendale BTI and Sir Robert Borden BTI.

The school building was demolished in 2014 and site is now a residential development called Eaton on the Park Townhomes.

== See also ==
- List of high schools in Ontario
