= Woburn Collegiate Institute =

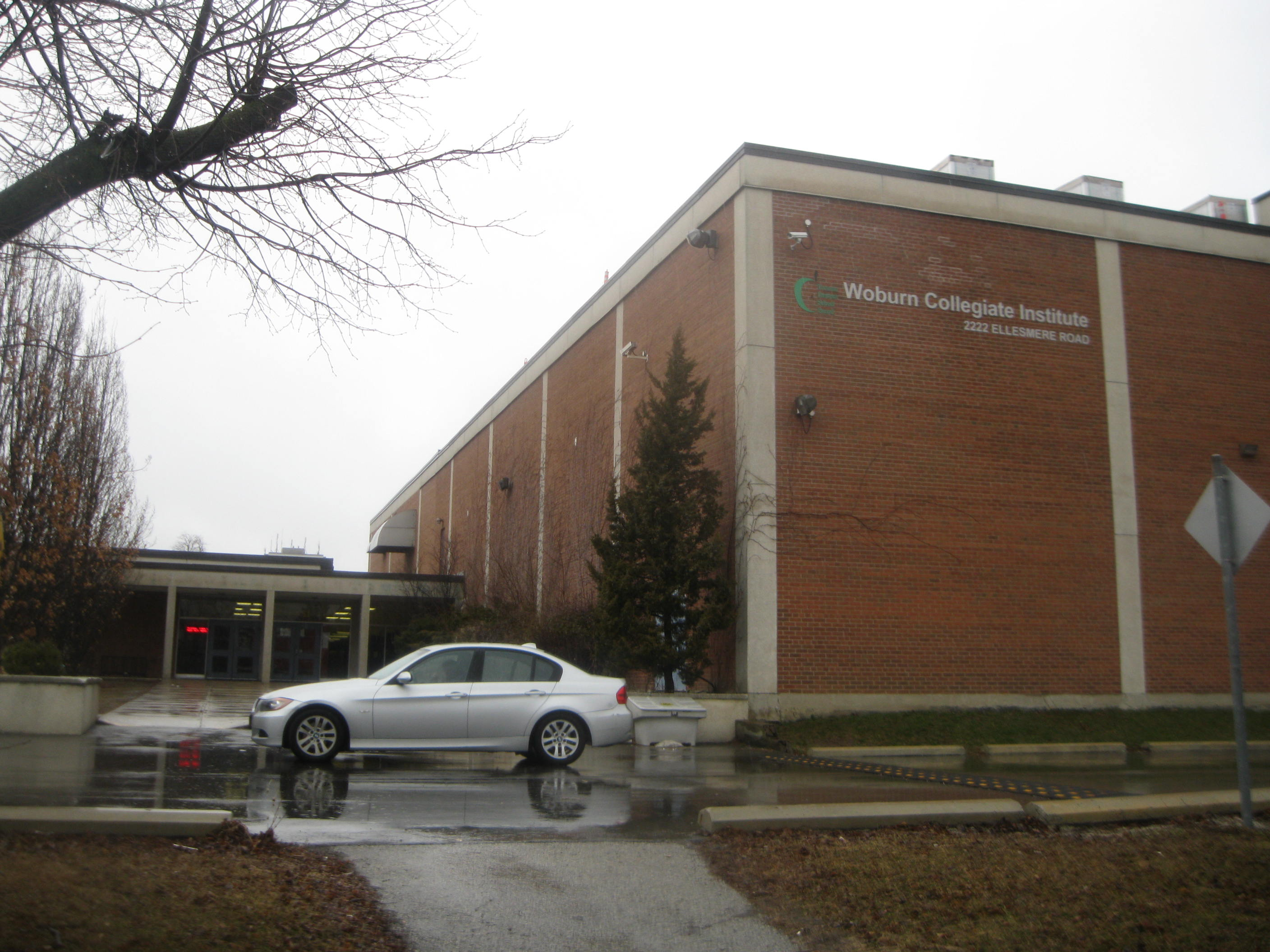
- Woburn Collegiate Institute entrance.

Location
- 2222 Ellesmere Road; Toronto, Ontario, M1G 3M3; Canada; 43°46′40″N 79°13′42″W

Information
- School type: Public secondary school
- Motto: Latin: Studium Eruditionis Crescat (Let the Zeal for Learning Flourish)
- Founded: 1963
- Status: Active
- School board: Toronto District School Board (Scarborough Board of Education)
- Superintendent: Marwa Hamid
- Area trustee: Zakir Patel; Ward 19
- School number: 4202 / 954160
- Principal: Daniel Lee
- Grades: 9-12
- Enrolment: 1120 (2025-2026)
- Language: English
- Schedule type: Semestered
- Colours: Red, Blue, and White
- Mascot: Wildcat
- Team name: Woburn Wildcats
- Yearbook: Retrospect
- Website: schoolweb.tdsb.on.ca/woburnci/

Woburn Collegiate Institute is a semestered, English-language public secondary school on Ellesmere Road in the Woburn neighbourhood of the Scarborough district of Toronto, Ontario, Canada operated by the Toronto District School Board. From its inception in 1963 until 1998, it was operated by the Scarborough Board of Education.

It has 1120 students as of September 2025. The school motto is "Studium Eruditionis Crescat", which is Latin for "Let the Zeal for Learning Flourish".

== History ==
By 1847, when Scarborough had grown to the point where an education system was more organized than the township's original, and a single school was required. The township established 16 School Sections, of which SS # 6 included the Woburn community. A school, also designated SS #6, was erected on Markham Road, just north of the 2nd Concession (Ellesmere Road). It was a one-story frame structure, 23 by 33 feet (7.0 m × 10.1 m) with windows for light and a wood stove for heat. Between 1850 and 1862, Alexander Muir taught at SS #6. He composed The Maple Leaf Forever, which for many years was Canada's unofficial national anthem; hence the maple leaf in the school crest.

A second school site of 1 acre (0.4 ha), on Ellesmere Road just east of Markham Road, was purchased from James Purvis, the owner of the surrounding property, for $200 in 1862. The second SS # 6, Woburn Public School, was built on the site in 1863. In 1895, an addition to the back of the building expanded it to two rooms. A few years later, the convenience of two outdoor privies was finally added. The school operated this way until 1956. By then, though, the old school just could not keep up with the demands of modern education or with the enrolment resulting from suburban development which had reached the area in the 1950s.

When the Scarborough Board of Education was formed in 1954, additional land for another new Woburn school was acquired for $21,000. In 1960, before the new school was built, it was officially named "Woburn Collegiate Institute". The Woburn building was designed by architects Parrott, Tambling and Witmer, and a construction contract worth $1.4 million was awarded in 1962 to Louis Donolo Ontario Ltd. The previous 1863-vintage S.S. # 6 was later demolished.

Woburn Collegiate Institute opened on September 3, 1963, as Scarborough's ninth collegiate to a total enrolment of 443 students, and the ceremonial opening took place on November 28, 1963. Two major additions were completed at a cost of $2.6 million in 1965 and 1969, including a new auditorium and auto shop. In 1973, school enrolment reached a peak of 2,302 students.

In 1998, the SBE ceased to exist and Woburn Collegiate became part of the newly amalgamated Toronto District School Board. In May 2013, Woburn C.I. celebrated its 50th anniversary.

On 31 October 2022, a school shooting occurred near the front entrance, killing one and seriously injuring another. The dead victim was a former student who attended Lester B. Pearson Collegiate Institute.

== Overview ==
=== Campus ===
Woburn is a two-storey, 216,634-square-foot (20,126 m^{2}) building on 16.4 acres (6.6 ha) of land, with 72 classrooms, 2 large gymnasia (which each may be divided into two smaller sections), a weight training room, a dance studio, an auto shop, two music rooms, two tech shops, a library (resource centre) and a 960-seat auditorium. The school also has a main office, a guidance office (student services) and an office for each of its departments. The building encloses a garden quadrangle, known by the students as "The Quad", which has a statue by Romanian-Canadian sculptor Sorel Etrog entitled "Soma". Identical statues can be found inside the Yonge-Eglinton Centre and York University's Accolade East building. Behind the school is a 400-m track, football field and goalposts for outdoor sports activities.

=== Students ===
As of 2019, Woburn has 919 students. The school has also been the home for Scarborough's secondary gifted programme for exceptional students since 1978.

=== Extracurricular activities ===
==== Student Activity Council (SAC) ====
The SAC is selected by the Woburn students:

- to represent their interests
- to support and fund their sports and clubs
- to organize special activities within the school

The SAC represents Woburn students at the school and in the community. The SAC organizes social activities and encourages school spirit. In the past SAC events have included dances, Charity Week activities, Spirit Week activities, Carnival, Woburn's Got Talent, Spirit Days, Grade 12 BBQ and the Semi-Formal. Funding for all clubs and most sports teams comes from the sale of SAC/ID cards and from fund-raising activities.

==== Prefects ====
Prefects are the goodwill ambassadors of Woburn. Working closely with faculty, the Prefects of Woburn are responsible for making sure school events run smoothly, such as Head Start to High School, photo days, and other various fairs, such as the university fair and parent-teacher interviews. Furthermore, the Prefects also plan an annual winter formal called "Multicultural Formal" or "MCF".

==== Woburn Robotics ====
Woburn Robotics, also known as Team 188 Blizzard, gathers every year to take part in the FIRST Robotics Competition, an international contest that teams students with engineers and sponsors from local businesses to develop skills in science, technology, marketing, and leadership. Over six intense weeks, the team brainstorms, designs, builds, and tests its 115-pound robot for the competition, whose objective changes every year. The robot is then immediately shipped off to compete in other tournaments. Team 188 is also an active event host in the VEX Robotics Competition, another internationally recognized robotics competition. Team 188 has amassed international recognition for consistent wins at District events, alongside regular attendance at the FIRST World Championships.

== Academics ==
Woburn Collegiate Institute is a Grade 9 to 12 school operates on a non-semestered system. From its founding until 2003, it had Grade 13, which was morphed into the Ontario Academic Credit (OAC) in 1984.

=== Mathematics ===
Mathematics is a prominent subject at Woburn Collegiate Institute. The school's participation in the International Mathematical Olympiad (IMO) provides one measure of its involvement in mathematics competitions. Canada began sending a six-member team to the IMO in 1981. Woburn first had a student represent Canada at the competition in 1986 and was represented eleven times over the following 18 years. During this period, the school had more representations than Earl Haig Secondary School, which had seven, and Upper Canada College, which had five.

=== Physics and Chemistry ===
In addition to the IMO, Woburn students have also gone on to represent Canada in the International Chemistry Olympiads (IChO) and International Physics Olympiads (IPhO).

=== Programming Enrichment Group (PEG) ===
Woburn is noted for its excellence in computer science. PEG is a group of students who meet on a weekly basis after school to study advanced computer science topics, discuss algorithms and approaches to difficult problems, often on the level of the International Olympiad in Informatics (at which Woburn has been represented a total of twenty times). Topics covered and types of problems approached vary depending on competition entries.

The learning methods used vary as well: sometimes students meet in study groups with their leader teaching them and solving practice sheets or programming problems, sometimes they are taught by one of the senior students, sometimes they work on the problem as a team, and sometimes they are taught by their coaches.

PEG students meet after school typically two nights per week to prepare for competitions in programming. Every year, members take part in competitions at provincial, national and international levels. PEG started its own competition in 1995, called the Woburn Challenge, to draw in both students from other schools and university students. This contest had grown to become province-wide (occasionally wider). The Woburn Challenge was discontinued in 2002 and restarted in October 2015.

Since its formation in the early 1990s, PEG has participated in a large number of competitions.

=== Woburn Music ===
The school is notable for its music program, consisting of several hundred students in band and choir classes, a Madrigal Choir, a concert choir, a Chamber Choir, two concert bands, a Wind Ensemble, a jazz band and a jazz combo.

The ensembles of the music program have regularly been invited to perform at national-level competitions and often make excursions to the US, including Orlando, Florida in mid-May 2006. The Wind Ensemble and Madrigal Choir have done particularly well in competitions, consistently placing at or near the top of the standings. On February 17, 2006, the Wind Ensemble travelled to the Musicfest competition held at the Le Parc Hotel, in Markham, Ontario, playing at the highest level, B500. The band received a gold rating.

Woburn's music department is student-represented by way of the Music Council, a body of elected students who help to keep the program running smoothly. The Council plans and runs many events and fundraisers through the year.

In May 2012, Woburn's Festival Chorus, Festival Winds and Jazz band performed at MusicFest Nationals in Ottawa, Ontario. All three ensembles received a silver award.

=== Woburn Rookie Drama Festival ===
The Woburn Rookie Drama Festival (usually just called Rookie) is a festival of short plays held annually every spring at Woburn. The most notable part of the festival is that all of its plays are directed, acted, crewed, and sometimes written entirely by students with no teacher assistance. Furthermore, students do all of the organization required to put on the festival each year and act as Masters of Ceremony. At over 40 years old, it is among the longest running high school clubs in the city. The first Woburn Rookie Drama Festival took place in the spring of 1963 and was overseen by then drama teacher John Wilcox.

Any student who wants to direct a play is automatically accepted. A month before the festival, there is an open audition during which actors perform short scenes that are either improved or done with only a short time to prepare. Directors request the actors they want, and the organizers assign actors to plays (often the most popular actors are assigned to several plays in smaller roles). The festival itself lasts for one to three evenings with two to four plays per night. There are usually short scenes between plays. Every year the festival has a theme chosen by the organizers. Sometimes the plays themselves are sometimes related to the theme, but normally the theme only applies to the short scenes between plays while the next cast is setting up. These scenes are usually directed or starring the MCs.

== Notable alumni ==
- Brad Duguid – former Liberal MPP for Scarborough Centre
- Aman Hambleton - Chess Grandmaster and Chessbrah founder
- Ludwig Heimrath Jr. – race car driver, started 30 CART races between 1984 and 1989, as well as three Indy 500 races with a best finish of 13th in 1989
- Charlie Huddy – former NHL hockey player
- Prakash John – rock bassist
- Steve Kouleas – sports broadcaster for The Score
- Holly Lewis — actress
- Des McAnuff – artistic director of the Stratford Shakespeare Festival
- Bob McKenzie – Sports broadcaster for TSN
- Steve Page – former member of the band Barenaked Ladies
- Steve Payne – Former NHL hockey player
- Ed Robertson – member of the band Barenaked Ladies
- Jeff Rosenthal – University of Toronto statistics professor and author
- Monika Schnarre – model, actress, television host, and real estate agent
- Laura Schuler — Canadian Olympic hockey player and NCAA hockey coach
- Leslie Seaforth – rapper, DJ, and producer known as More Or Les
- Sudz Sutherland — Director and screenwriter
- Varun Saranga - Actor
- Brad Tapper – former NHL hockey player
- Dennis Timbrell – former Conservative MPP and Ontario cabinet minister
- Peter Todd – Crytopgrapher/early Bitcoin developer
- Asha Tomlinson - award-winning investigative journalist with CBC

== See also ==
- Education in Ontario
- List of secondary schools in Ontario
