= Flemingdon Park =

- Neighbourhood
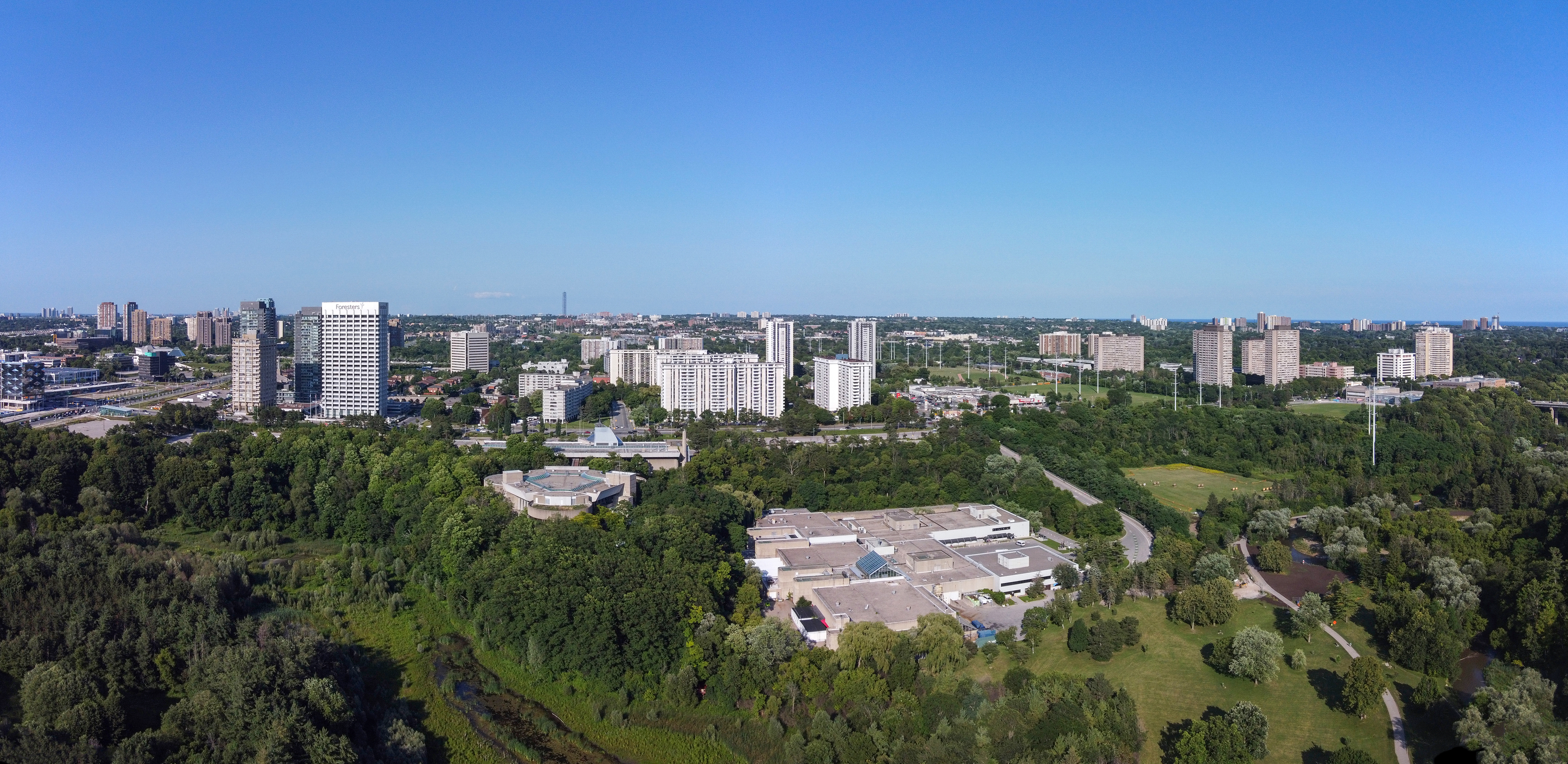
- Aerial view of Flemingdon Park in 2023

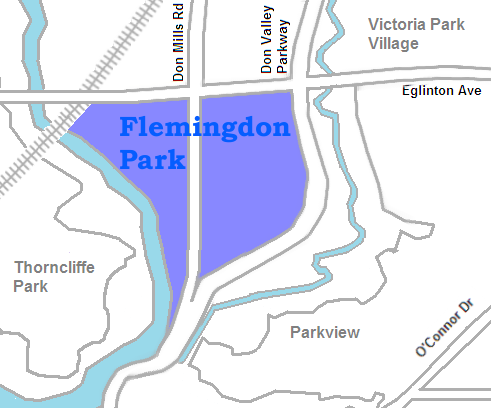
- Coordinates: 43°43′10″N 79°20′20″W
- Country: Canada
- Province: Ontario
- City: Toronto
- Municipality Established: 1850 York Township
- Changed Municipality: 1922 North York Township from York Township
- Changed Region: 1953 Metropolitan Toronto from York County
- Changed Municipality: 1967 Borough of North York from North York Township
- Changed Municipality: 1979 City of North York from Borough of North York
- Changed Municipality: 1998 City of Toronto from City of North York

Government
  - MP: Rob Oliphant (Don Valley West)
  - MPP: Adil Shamji (Don Valley East)
  - Mayor: Olivia Chow (City of Toronto)
  - Councillor: Jon Burnside (Don Valley East)
- Postal code span: M3C
- Area codes: 416, 647, 437, 942

Flemingdon Park is a neighbourhood in Toronto, Ontario, Canada, in the former City of North York.

The City of Toronto recognizes Flemingdon Park's boundaries as the West Don River on the west side; Eglinton Avenue East on the north side; the East Don River on the east side; and the property line parallel to the Canadian National Railway on the south side.

== History ==
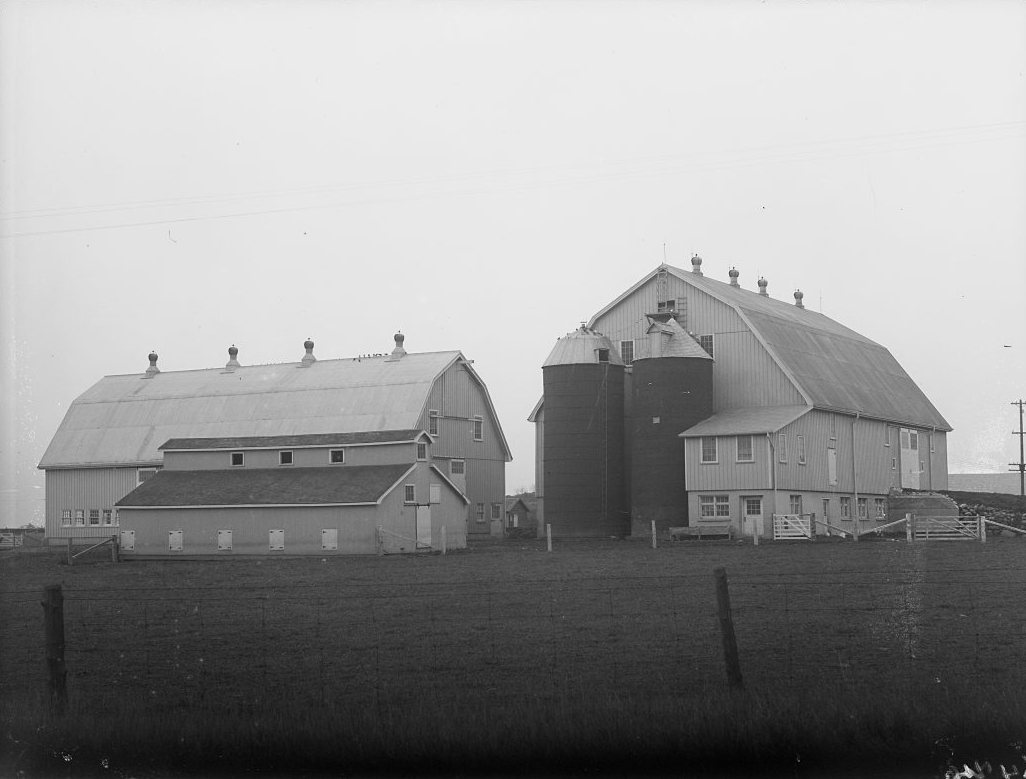
Donlands Farm, 1925.

Flemingdon Park takes its name from former Toronto mayor Robert John Fleming and his descendants, who owned Donlands Farm from 1922 until the development of the residential community in the late 1950s.

In 1958, following the trends of many other post-World War II cities, Toronto began to consider a large planned "apartment city" community for the 1950s population boom and influx of immigrants. Although there was NIMBY opposition to the population density of the development, the community was nevertheless built. Occupancy of the new apartments began in 1961, and the community was completed in the early 1970s. The community's developer was Olympia and York.

On September 26, 1969, the Ontario Science Centre opened to the public. It was a major tourist attraction in Toronto before permanently closing in June 2024. Several commercial high rise buildings were developed in the late 20th century in Flemingdon Park including Foresters Tower, a 23-story high-rise, two 14-storey high-rises ICICI Bank Tower & De Beers Tower. Three residential high rise towers located next to the golf course were built in 1990. Sony Music Canada and Intel Core later acquired the two buildings as its functioning head office.

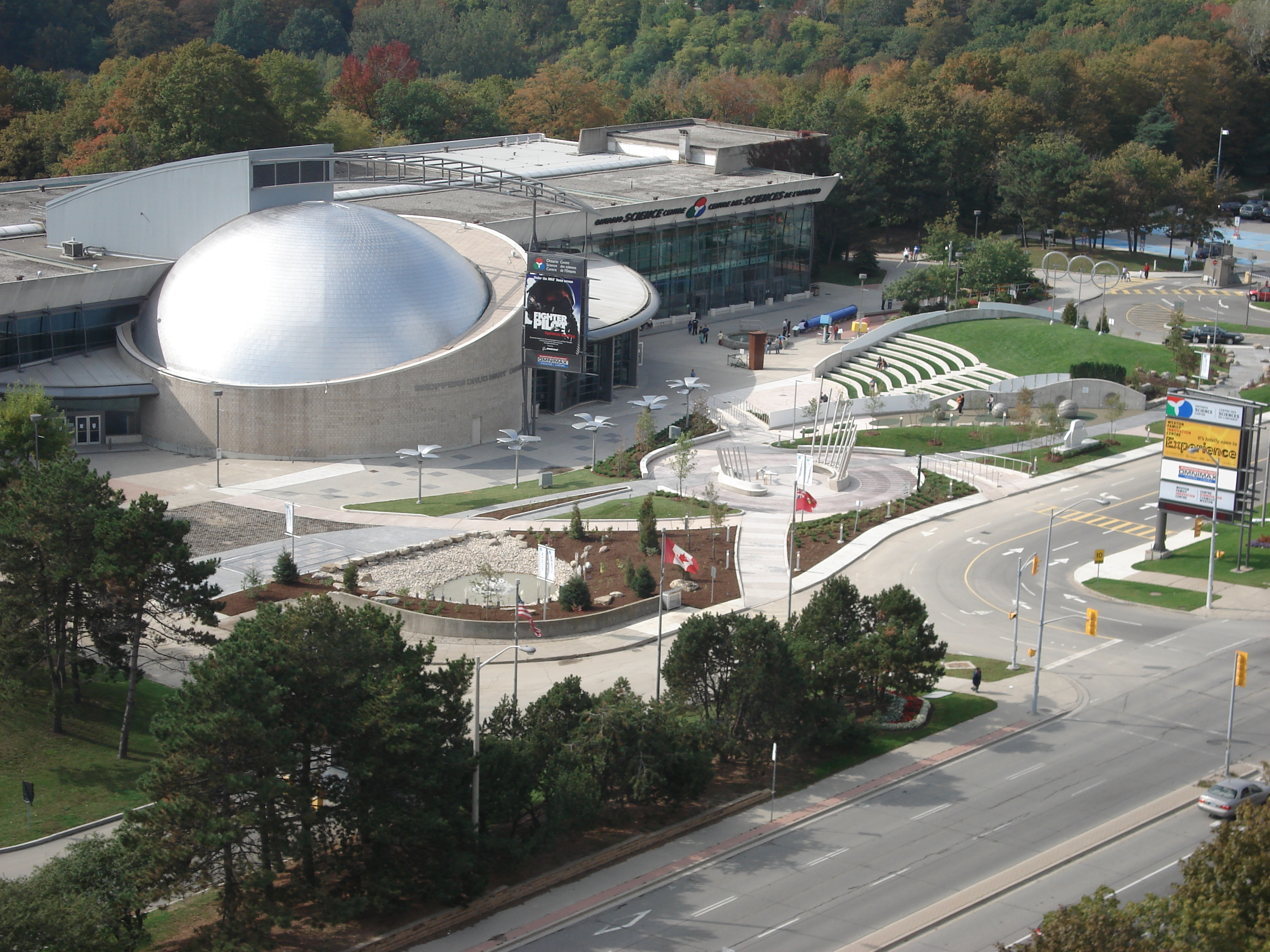
In 1969, the Ontario Science Centre was opened in Flemingdon Park. It permanently closed in 2024 with the site being developed as part of the Ontario Line as the building sits empty

Valley Park Junior High School opened in 1969, followed by Overlea Secondary School (now Marc Garneau Collegiate Institute) in 1972. Both schools were operated as East York Board of Education schools, despite being built in North York.

In 1977, the Report of the Royal Commission on Metropolitan Toronto recommended that Flemingdon Park be removed from the Borough of North York, and added to the Borough of East York, but the Ontario government did not implement the change. Two decades later, East York Council's proposal to take over Flemingdon Park, in response to the Report of the GTA Task Force, was declined by the province.

Like many communities with a significant public housing component, Flemingdon Park has gained a reputation as a working-class community. New development has come, directed at higher-income residents, built mostly along the Don River ravines on the edges of Flemingdon Park. In 2000, this included the addition of a new section of middle-class single and semi-detached housing, and a luxury condominium apartment called "Tribeca", converted from an office building that was originally part of the Foresters complex, along the community's north side. Townhomes were along the community's east border, in a narrow strip between the Don Valley Parkway and the Don River (east), overlooking the Don Valley, located next to Flemingdon Park Golf Club.

A new condo development called Sonic consists of two high-rise buildings of 28 and 30 storeys in height and also includes four-storey townhomes. Due to the development's proximity to Rochefort Drive, which is a low-income block of Flemingdon Park south of the condominiums, it has made the purchase of Sonic suites undesirable.

The Line 5 Eglinton, a light rapid transit line, opened in 2026 with three stops in Flemingdon Park. It connects the neighbourhood to the Line 1 Yonge–University subway and to Scarborough Town Centre. Plans are being made for a large land development at the 24-hectare former Celestica site at Don Mills Road and Eglinton Avenue to house thousands of people in eight condo towers, and open new offices and shops.

== Redevelopment ==
Since April 2017, plans to build an additional apartment to the existing 25 Saint Dennis Drive apartment by Preston Group was underway and later approved by the City of Toronto. Residents have continued to advocate against the redevelopment, which includes a 37-storey residential building, on the premise that residents were not adequately consulted with.

Celestica's manufacturing plant, which once sat at 844 Don Mills Road, was demolished in late 2018 to make way for Crosstown by developers Aspen Ridge homes. The site will feature a 100,000 square-foot recreation centre, townhomes, over a dozen condominium suites, and retail spaces.

== Demographics ==
Flemingdon Park Golf Course overlooking Palisades Condos

Traditionally, the neighbourhood served as affordable housing for new immigrants to Canada. Today, the neighbourhood's population is mainly immigrants, who account for approximately two-thirds of the residents (Canada 2011 Census). Though quite diverse in composition, the majority of immigrants originate from South Asia, Southeast Asia, Eastern Europe and Western Europe (Census 2006, Census 2011). Statistics Canada 2011 census has reported that the population of Flemingdon Park consists of residents born in various places around the world, including Greeks, Pakistanis, Filipinos and Sri Lankans.

== Community Housing Buildings ==
Flemingdon Park is heavily saturated with developments and housing projects that are under the ownership of the Toronto Community Housing Corporation. The buildings include:

1, 4, 6 and 8 Vendome Place; 61 and 58 Grenoble Drive, 18, 20 and 22 Saint Dennis Drive.

The buildings were constructed in the early 1960s, and were designed by Irving Grossman. The buildings are made of brick and mortar. Due to its long-standing status in the community, these buildings are slated for demolition in coming years.

Residents over the years have reported "deplorable" living conditions, according to articles from the Toronto Star Leaky roofs, damaged window mesh and unsecure entrances are some of the problems reported.

In 2016, Flemingdon Park went under a series of restoration projects that were intended to prolong the longevity of its community housing buildings. The projects include new fencing alongside apartment units on 1 Vendome Place, as well as the replacement of roofing. Additionally, the Toronto Community Housing Corporation expended funds to restore and renovate its on-site basketball court, located around housing units at 1 Vendome Place; ultimately, its basketball fencing was replaced, picnic bench fixtures were added, and LED lighting was installed around the court to promote safety.

== Education ==
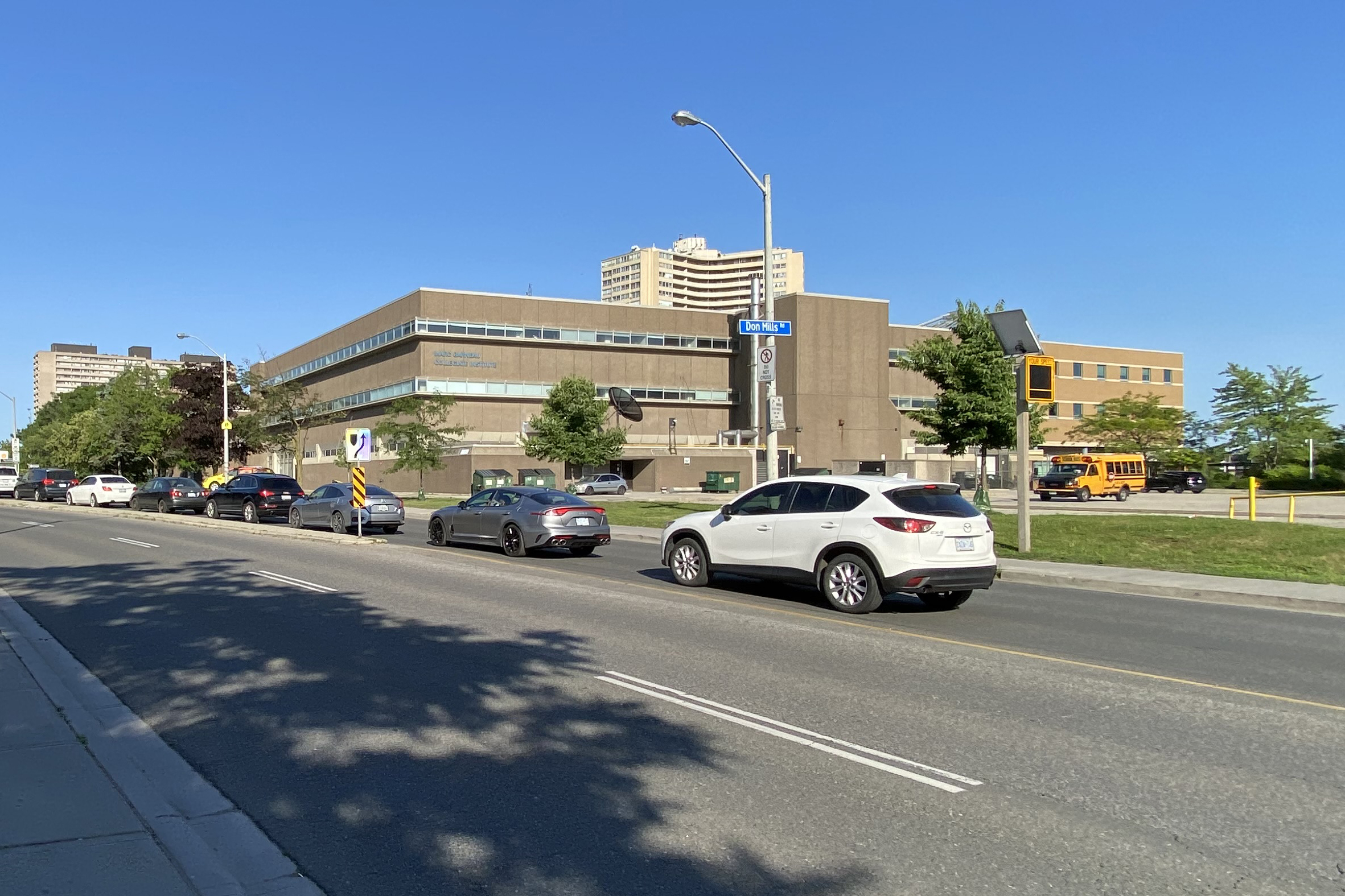
Marc Garneau Collegiate Institute is a secondary school situated in Flemingdon Park.

The Toronto District School Board operates four schools in Flemingdon Park: Gateway Public School, Grenoble Public School, Valley Park Middle School, and Marc Garneau Collegiate Institute.

The Toronto Catholic District School Board's St. John XXIII Catholic School is also in the community.

== Places of worship ==
Flemingdon Park is home to several buildings of worship; primarily three churches and two musallahs, which are centrally located around many highrise buildings. The places of worship in the community share a wide array of services, and the physical designs of each building reflect different periods in which they were constructed, including contemporary, modern and Anglican-styled designs.

The community is home to the Darul Khair Islamic Centre, which is a privately operated musallah located within 35 Saint Dennis Drive. The musallah offers Friday Prayers services, known as jummah, as well as Islamic education and schooling for the youth (madrasah), marriage counselling and nikkah services, emotional supports, and Eid Prayers (as a host venue occasionally).

In June 2021, the Darul Khair Islamic Centre was the host for a pop-up COVID-19 vaccine clinic, managed by Michael Garron Hospital.

The Darul Khair Islamic Centre was first established in Flemingdon Park in 2001, and is operated under the support of donations by public attendees.

Following a growing demand for Muslims in the community to attend Islamic education classes that were already full at the Darul Khair Islamic Centre, a second space was acquired with the financial assistance of the public. The space, known as the Lantern of Knowledge Academy, is located at the 29th unit of the Shopping Centre, and is slated to teach both hifz and alim-level courses.

Flemingdon Park is home to The Church of Jesus Christ of Latter-day Saints, on Ferrand Drive, which is southeast of Don Mills Road and Eglinton Avenue. The Flemingdon Park Pentecostal Church is located across the Flemingdon Park Shopping Centre at 5 Grenoble Drive, and the Saint John XXIII Parish Community, which is situated proximal to the Pentecostal Church at 150 Grenoble Drive.

== Recreation ==
Toronto Parks, Forestry & Recreation (PF&R) manages the Dennis R. Timbrell Resource Centre, Flemingdon Community Centre and Playground Paradise, and Angela James Arena & Tennis Courts. It also maintains a number of public parks: Ferrand Drive Park, Flemingdon Park, Gateway Greenbelt, Linkwood Lane Park and Parkette, and E.T. Seton Park, which is part of the Toronto Ravine System. The Flemingdon Park branch of the Toronto Public Library operates in the neighbourhood. The Flemingdon Park Golf Club opened in the neighbourhood in the early 1960s.

== Commerce ==
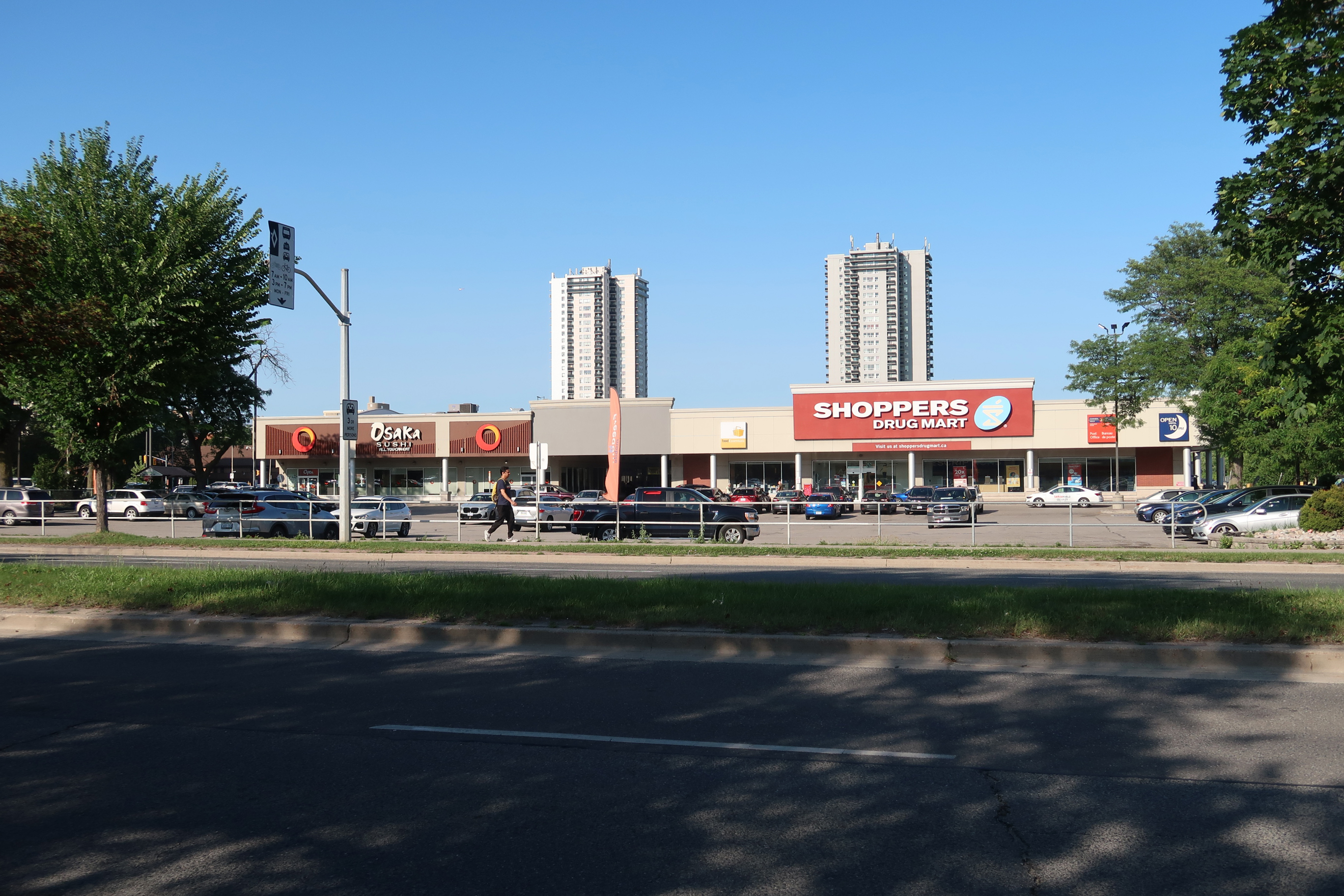
Flemingdon Park Shopping Centre

Flemingdon Park houses two strip mall properties; the Flemingdon Shopping Centre, and the Dongate Plaza, which rests proximal to Don Mills Road. Flemingdon Shopping Centre is the anchor mall, which rests upon a parcel of land under the address 747 Don Mills Road, and is home to major retailers and eateries.

== Transportation ==
=== Public Transportation ===
Toronto Transit Commission buses operate in Flemingdon Park.

Line 5 Eglinton, a light rail transit line operates as a part of the Toronto subway system, has three stops in the neighbourhood: Don Valley Station, Aga Khan Park & Museum, and Wynford.

The Ontario Line, a rapid transit line under construction, will have two elevated stations in the community: Flemingdon Park Station, and Don Valley Station, creating an interchange with Line 5 Eglinton.

=== Roads ===
Three major roadways pass through Flemingdon Park: the Don Valley Parkway, Eglinton Avenue East, and Don Mills Road.

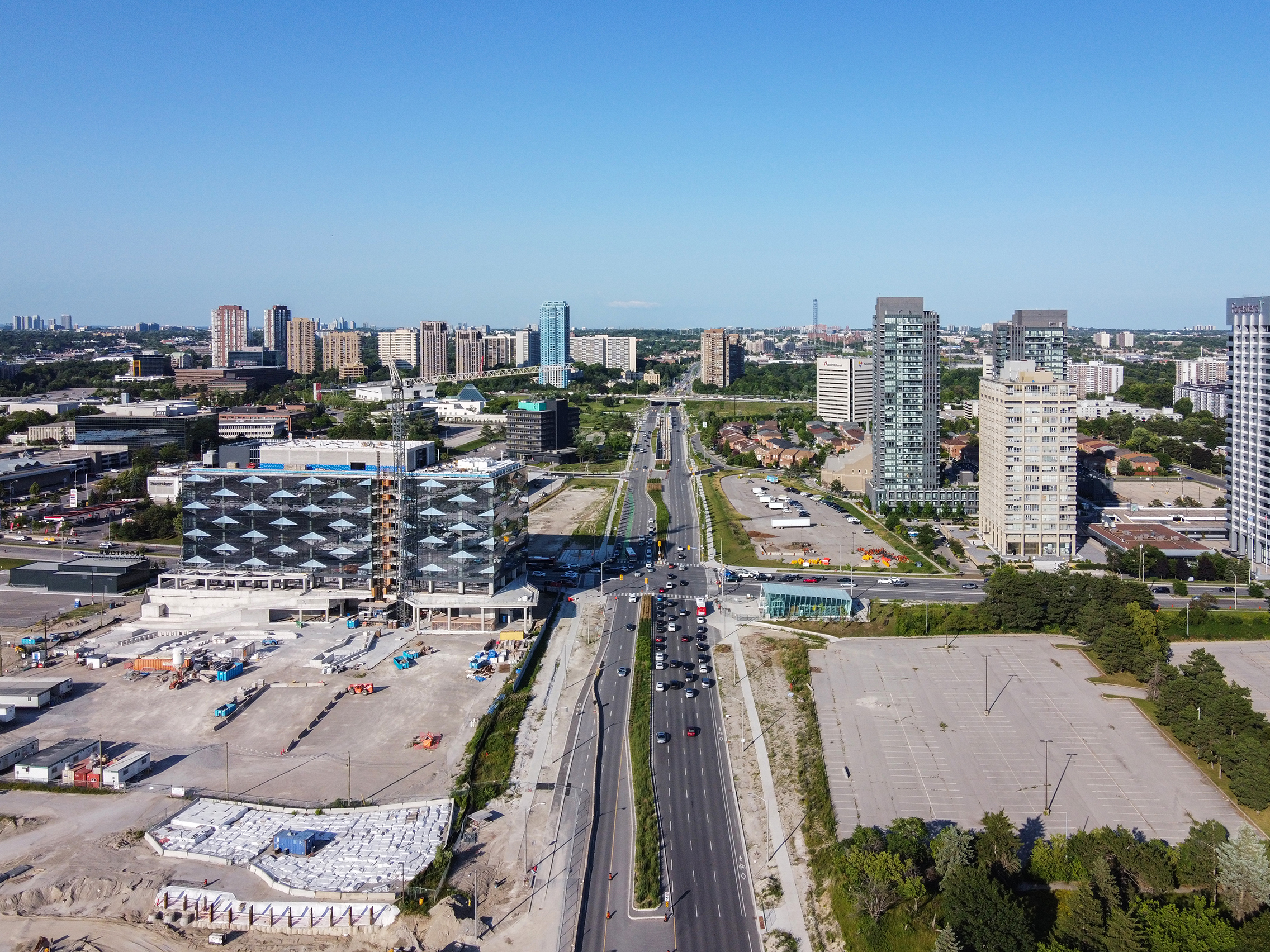
Eglinton Avenue East in Flemingdon Park

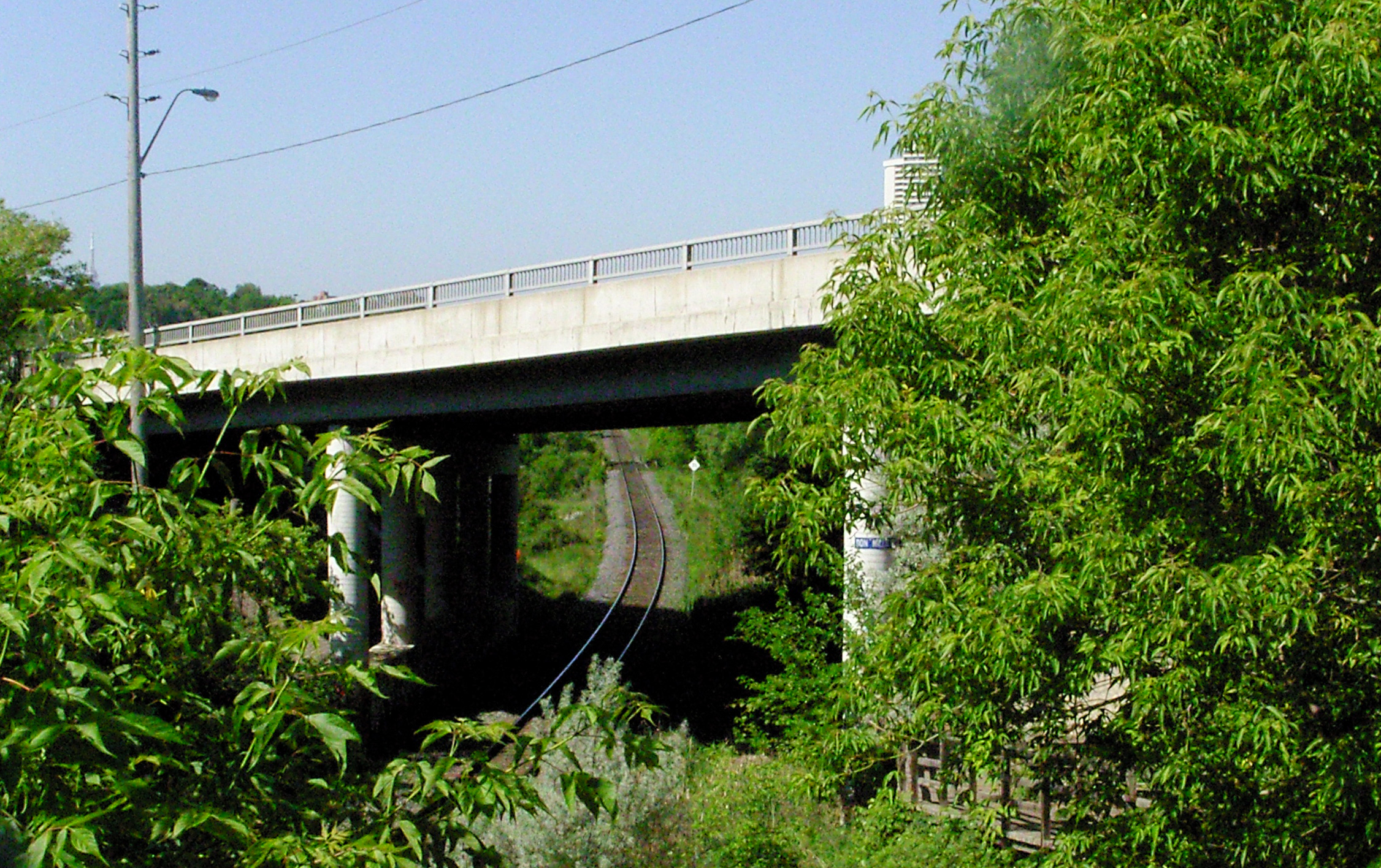
Don Mills Road is a major thoroughfare that runs north–south in Flemingdon Park.

== In culture ==
The neighbourhood has been depicted in the National Film Board of Canada's Flemingdon Park: The Global Village documentary, Kardinall Offishall's music video for The Anthem, and on CBC Television's late-night satirical sketch show, Nightcap.

== Notable residents ==
- Robert John Fleming, former mayor of Toronto.
- Michael Coteau, Canadian politician.
- Deborah Cox, R&B singer-songwriter and actress.
- Michael Hollett, journalist, publisher.
- Angela James, hockey player and Hockey Hall of Fame inductee.
- Jamaal Magloire, professional basketball player.
- Kardinal Offishall, hip hop musician.
- Ian Iqbal Rashid, writer and filmmaker.
