= Peter Gastis =

Canadian soccer player

Personal information
- Date of birth: August 23, 1971 (age 55)
- Place of birth: Toronto, Ontario, Canada
- Position: Midfielder

Youth career
- 1987–1988: Danforth Collegiate and Technical Institute
- 1989: East York Collegiate Institute

Senior career*
Years	Team	Apps	(Gls)
1989–1992	North York Rockets	56	(2)
1995–1996	Chicago Power (indoor)	3	(2)
1996	St. Catharines Wolves		
1996–1997	Toronto Shooting Stars (indoor)	6	(3)
- * Club domestic league appearances and goals

Peter Gastis (born August 23, 1971) is a Canadian former soccer player who played as a midfielder.

== Club career ==
=== Youth ===
Gastis played soccer at the high school level in 1987, where he played in the Toronto High School Senior Soccer Championship final with Danforth Collegiate and Technical Institute and helped them win the title by contributing a goal against Western Technical-Commercial School. He returned to play with Danforth for the 1988 season. In the summer of 1989, he represented Team Ontario in the Canada Games and won the gold medal after recording a goal against Team Quebec.

Gastis would transfer over to East York Collegiate Institute in 1989. The 1989 season also marked his experience in the professional ranks as he signed an amateur contract with the North York Rockets of the Canadian Soccer League.

=== North York ===
In 1989, he played in the national Canadian Soccer League on an amateur contract with North York Rockets. In his debut season with North York, he assisted the club in securing a playoff berth by finishing third in the East Division. North York would be eliminated from the postseason in the opening round by Hamilton Steelers. Gastis would appear in 12 matches with North York. He re-signed with North York the following season. In his sophomore year, he assisted the Rockets in securing another playoff berth by finishing fifth in the division. Once more the Rockets were eliminated in the preliminary round by the Vancouver 86ers.

The 1991 season marked his third consecutive year with the organization and he managed to record his first goal against Kitchener Kickers on August 28, 1991. North York qualified for the postseason for the third consecutive season where he scored a goal in the semi-final round against Toronto Blizzard. Throughout the season he made 13 appearances and recorded 1 goal. In 1992, he returned for his final season with North York. The club would once again clinch a playoff spot but was eliminated from the competition in the quarterfinals by Winnipeg Fury.

=== St. Catharines ===
In 1996, he played in the southern Ontario-based Canadian National Soccer League with St. Catharines Wolves. He would help the Wolves claim the league cup and secure a playoff berth by finishing second in the standings. Gastis would appear in the first match of the championship final against Toronto Italia.

=== Indoor soccer ===
In the winter of 1995. he played at the indoor level in the American-based National Professional Soccer League with Chicago Power. In total, he played in 3 matches and scored 2 goals. He would play with the expansion side Toronto Shooting Stars the following year. He would enter the club's history books as he recorded the team's first regular-season goal against St. Louis Ambush. In his debut season, he would play in 6 matches and recorded 3 goals.

=== Senior amateur ===
In 2008, he played with Markham Soccer Club Lightning and won the Ontario Cup master's title.

== International career ==
Gastis was selected to the Canada men's national under-20 soccer team for the 1990 CONCACAF U-20 Tournament.
