= Marc Garneau Collegiate Institute =

Location
- 135 Overlea Boulevard; Toronto, Ontario, M3C 1B3; Canada; 43.710266°N 79.335735°W

Information
- School type: Public, high school
- Founded: 1973
- School board: Toronto District School Board (East York Board of Education)
- Superintendent: Nadira Persaud
- Area trustee: Stacey Cline; Ward 11
- School number: 1950 / 933198
- Principal: Gillian Evans
- Grades: 9-12
- Enrolment: 1800
- Language: English
- Campus size: 8.6 acres
- Area: Flemingdon Park
- Colours: Blue, Maroon and White
- Mascot: Cougar
- Team name: Garneau Cougars
- Newspaper: The Reckoner of MGCI
- Communities served: Flemingdon Park, Thorncliffe Park
- Feeder schools: Valley Park Middle School
- Website: schoolweb.tdsb.on.ca/marcgarneau/
- Last updated: April 17, 2025

Marc Garneau Collegiate Institute, formerly known as Overlea Secondary School, is a high school in Toronto, Ontario, Canada within the North York area, and part of the Toronto District School Board. Until 1998, this school was part of the East York Board of Education.

It is the host school of the Talented Offerings for Programs in the Sciences (TOPS) program, a math, science and English enrichment program. Admission to the TOPS Program was originally merit-based, but became a randomized system on September 2023.

== History ==
Overlea Secondary School, the third high school in the former suburb of East York, opened its doors in September 1972 by the East York Board of Education with 250 students as one of the first open concept schools in Canada. On September 4, 1973 it had 400 pupils and 42 staff. On October 16, 1987, Overlea S.S. was renamed 'Marc Garneau Collegiate Institute' after Canada's first astronaut Marc Garneau, who regularly visits the school and its students. It hosts the TOPS program and has offered pilot courses in Earth and Space Science, Science Journalism, and Cisco Networking. The school was built in the jurisdiction within North York as opposed to East York.

Valley Park Middle School is the main school that feeds students into MGCI but there are other schools as well such as Cosburn Middle School.

In 1993, MGCI was honoured with the Roberta Bondar Science and Technology Award in recognition of the school's achievements in numerous student programs, particularly its Students for the Exploration and Development of Space chapter, which no longer exists. Renovations to the school in 1998 removed many of the open concept elements of the school's original design.

On December 31, 1997, the EYBE was dissolved and Marc Garneau Collegiate became part of the new Toronto District School Board the following day.

== Student life ==
Some of the clubs include chapters of FBLA, DECA, Law Society, MGCI EcoTeam, MGCI Muslim Student Association, Student Council, The Reckoner of MGCI, and the Key Club. The school has had several first and second-place finishes in the International FBLA Competition and the International DECA Competition.

Other extracurricular activities include the Concert Band, String Orchestra, Music Council, Musical Theater, Mock Trials, Reach for the Top, Math Club, Computer Science Club, Cybersecurity Club, Game Development Club, Social Strategy Club, and Physics Club.

Garneau provides students with a wide variety of sports teams including: Football, Rugby, Basketball, Soccer, Volleyball, Baseball, Field Hockey, Ultimate Frisbee, Cricket, Tennis, and an annual ball hockey tournament. The official mascot for the school is the cougar.

Drama students at Marc Garneau perform musicals and plays, and participate in many activities, such as the Canadian Improv Games and the Sears Festival.

The Reckoner of MGCI is the school's newspaper. The Reckoner was named "Best Volunteer Newspaper" at the "Toronto Star High School Newspaper Awards" in 2014 and "Best Electronic Newspaper" in 2011 and 2014. In 2015, The Reckoner was named "Best Electronic Newspaper" once again by the Toronto Star.

== Recognition and awards ==
In 2004, Maclean's magazine ranked the TOPS program at MGCI as among the best schools in Canada, suggesting it was the top-ranked program for students pursuing science or mathematics in their later studies. The September 2006 issue of Toronto Life also stated that MGCI was the best high school in Toronto for mathematics and science, largely crediting the TOPS program.

MGCI also frequently places in the top 3 in various University of Waterloo math contests.

== Notable alumni ==
- Alex Cai - Olympic Foil Fencer
- Angela James - Canadian national hockey player and Hall of Famer
- Charles Khabouth - nightclub owner
- Saad Bin Zafar - Canadian national cricket player

== See also ==
- Education in Ontario
- List of secondary schools in Ontario
