= Nick Volpe =

Canadian football player (1926–2021)

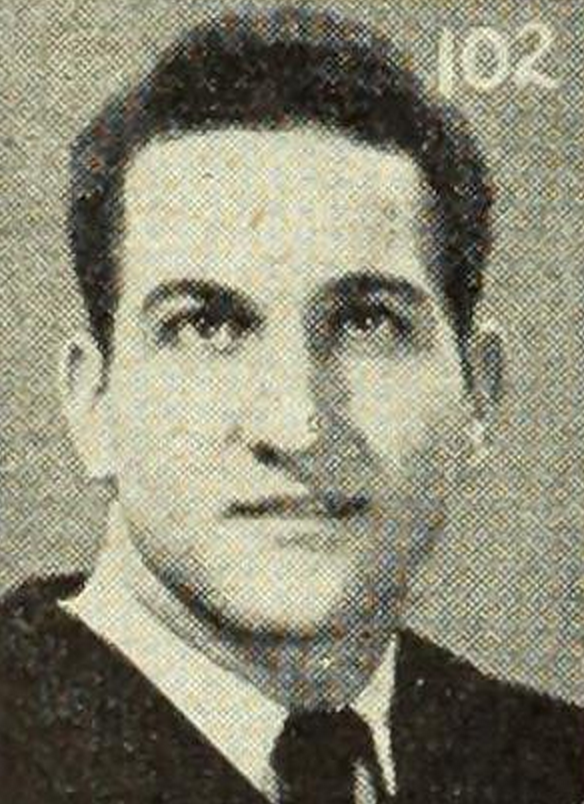
- Volpe pictured in Torontonensis 1948, University of Toronto yearbook

Profile
- Position: Halfback

Personal information
- Born: February 23, 1926; Toronto, Ontario, Canada
- Died: August 21, 2021 (aged 95); Brampton, Ontario, Canada
- Listed height: 5 ft 10 in (1.78 m)
- Listed weight: 170 lb (77 kg)

Career information
- High school: East York (ON)
- University: Toronto

Career history
- 1949–1952: Toronto Argonauts

Awards and highlights
- Grey Cup champion (1950)

Nicholas Peter Volpe (February 23, 1926 – August 21, 2021) was a Canadian professional football player who played for the Toronto Argonauts. He won the Grey Cup with the Argonauts in 1950, where he was named the game MVP. Volpe previously played football and attended the University of Toronto and East York Collegiate. He served as Consultant for Football Operations for the Argonauts. He was inducted into the University of Toronto Hall of Fame in 2012. Volpe died in August 2021 at the age of 95.
