= Joseph Mancinelli =

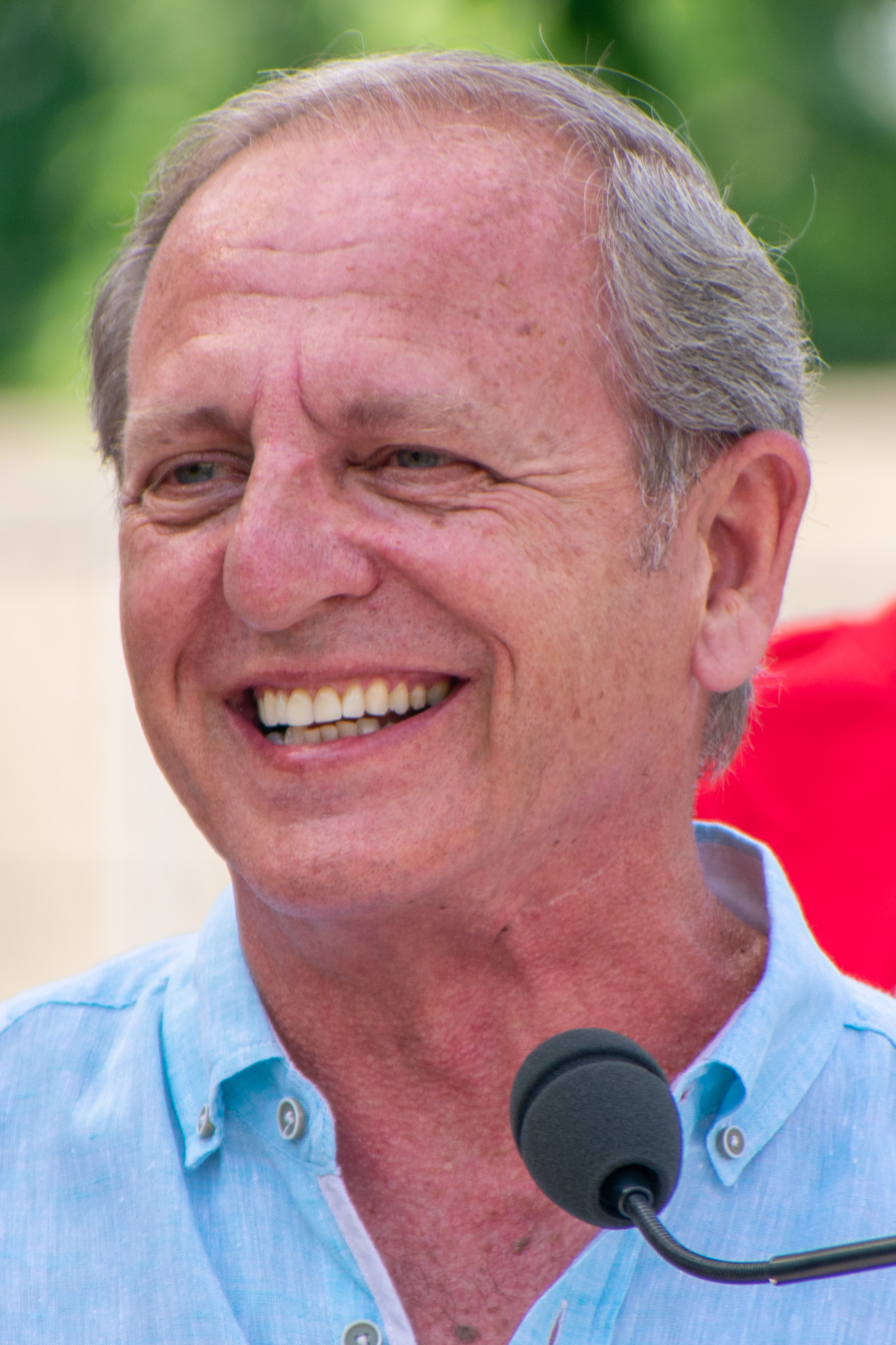
- Joe Mancinelli
- Born: Joseph Mancinelli; September 11, 1957 (age 68); Hamilton, Ontario, Canada.
- Occupation: Vice-President
- Organization: Laborers' International Union of North America
- Parent: Enrico Mancinelli (1925-2006)

Joseph Mancinelli (born September 11, 1957) is the International Vice President and Regional Manager for Central and Eastern Canada of the Laborers' International Union of North America, a US-based labour union representing over 800,000 total members with 160,000 members in the LIUNA Central and Eastern Canadian region.

Mancinelli was involved in a number of the Union's large redevelopment initiatives in Hamilton's downtown core, including the restoration of the former CN Rail Station into LIUNA Station and the development of LIUNA's long-term care facilities. In 2009 the Union under Mr. Mancinelli's leadership completed a new head office facility in Oakville, the first Silver Certified LEED (Leadership in Energy and Environment Design) office building in the area.

On May 5, 2010, Mancinelli along with senior LIUNA officials from across North America presented a $46,000.00 donation to the Hamilton-Wentworth Catholic School Board. The money will be used in support of the St. Joseph Home for Boys, an orphanage in Port-au-Prince Haiti, that was destroyed in the January 12th Haiti earthquake.

On May 28, 2014, Mancinelli was inducted into the Italian Walk of Fame in Toronto’s Little Italy along with American actor Joe Mantegna, of the TV series Criminal Minds; musician Gino Vannelli and cartoonist Andy Donato.

== See also ==
- Laborers' International Union of North America
- Trade union
- Laborer
