= Mike Bradwell =

Canadian football player (born 1986)

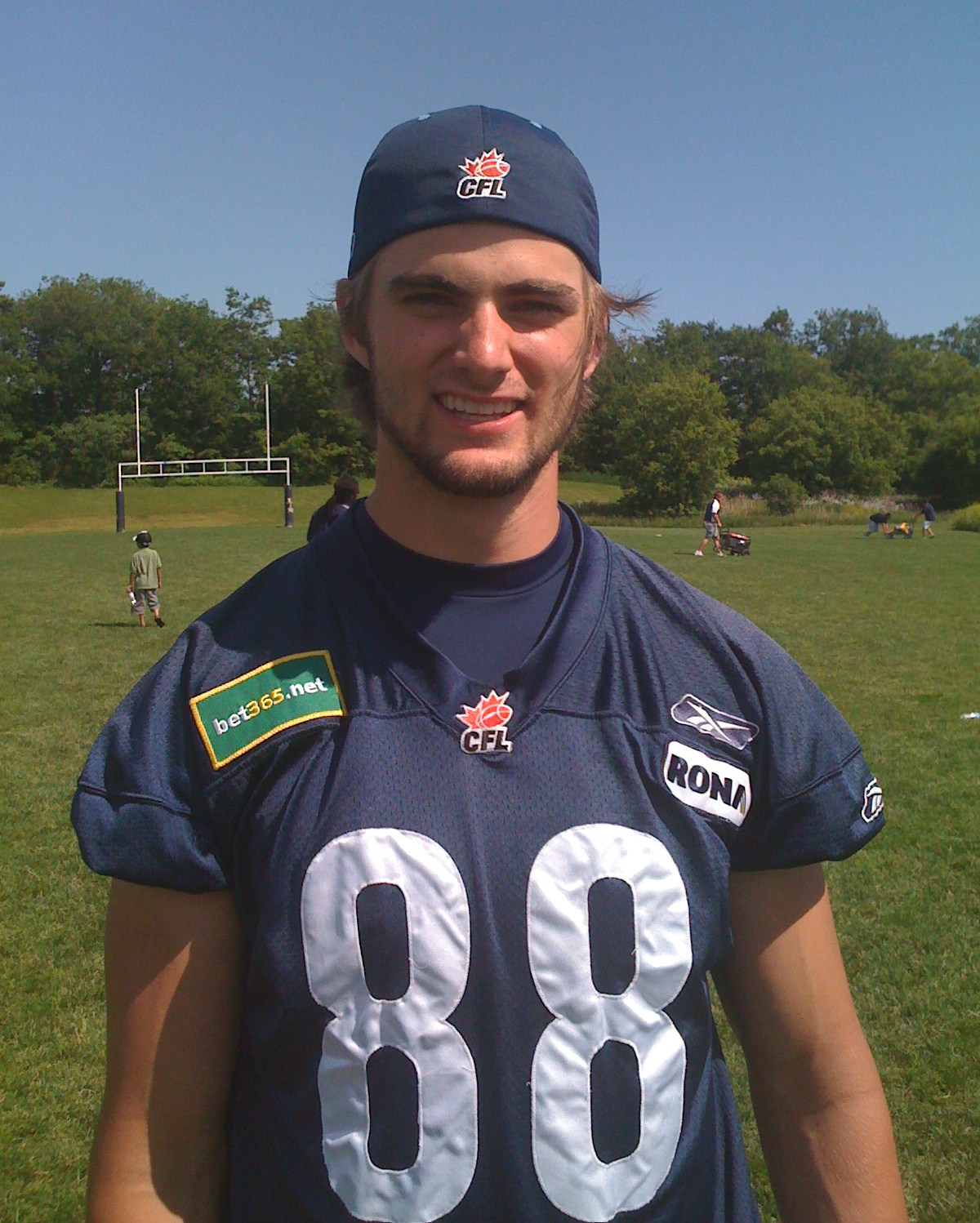

No. 88
- Position: Wide receiver

Personal information
- Born: July 11, 1986 (age 40); Toronto, Ontario, Canada
- Listed height: 6 ft 3 in (1.91 m)
- Listed weight: 200 lb (91 kg)

Career information
- High school: Leaside
- College: McMaster
- CFL draft: 2012: 2nd round, 13th overall pick

Career history
- Toronto Argonauts (2009–2014)

Awards and highlights
- Grey Cup champion (2012)
- Stats at CFL.ca (archive)

Mike Bradwell (born July 11, 1986) is a Canadian former professional football wide receiver who played for the Toronto Argonauts of the Canadian Football League (CFL). He was drafted in the second round of the 2008 CFL draft by the Toronto Argonauts. He began playing football in his final year at Leaside High School and played CIS football with McMaster University.

== Personal life ==
Bradwell majored in civil engineering at McMaster University.
