= Hugh Garner =

Canadian writer (1913–1979)

- Born: February 22, 1913; Batley, England
- Died: June 30, 1979 (aged 66); Toronto, Canada
- Education: Danforth Technical High School
- Occupation: Novelist
- Known for: writing

Hugh Garner (February 22, 1913 – June 30, 1979) was a Canadian novelist.

== Biography ==
=== Early life ===
Hugh Garner was born on February 22, 1913, in Batley, Yorkshire, England. He moved to Canada in 1919 with his parents, and was raised in Toronto, Ontario where he attended Danforth Technical High School.

During the Great Depression, he rode the rails in both Canada and the United States, and then joined the International Brigades in the Spanish Civil War. During World War II he served in the Royal Canadian Navy.

=== Career ===
Following the war, Garner concentrated on his writing. He published his first novel, Storm Below, in 1949. Garner's most famous novel, Cabbagetown, depicted life in the Toronto neighbourhood of Cabbagetown, then Canada's most famous slum, during the Depression. It was published in abridged form in 1950, and in an expanded edition in 1968. The Intruders, a sequel depicting the gentrification of the neighbourhood, was published in 1976.

Later in his career, he concentrated on mystery novels, including Death in Don Mills (1975) and Murder Has Your Number (1978).

His background (poor, urban, Protestant) is rare for a Canadian writer of his time. It is nevertheless, the foundation for his writing. His theme is working-class Ontario; the realistic novel his preferred genre. Cabbagetown is the best-known example of his style. His focus on the victimization of the worker reflects his socialist roots.

In 1963, he won the Governor General's Award for his collection of short stories entitled Hugh Garner's Best Stories. Garner struggled much of his life with alcoholism, and died in 1979 of alcohol-related illness. A housing cooperative in Cabbagetown is named in his memory.

=== Death ===
He died on June 30, 1979.

== Works ==
=== Novels ===
- Storm Below (1949)
- Waste No Tears (1950) (as "Jarvis Warwick")
- Cabbagetown (first published in abridged form in 1950; restored version published in 1968)
- Present Reckoning (1951)
- The Silence on the Shore (1962)
- The Sin Sniper (1970)
- A Nice Place to Visit (1970)
- Death in Don Mills (1975)
- The Intruders (1976; something of a sequel to Cabbagetown)
- Murder Has Your Number (1978)
- Don't Deal Five Deuces (1992; novel completed by Paul Steuwe after Garner's death)

=== Short fiction ===
- The Yellow Sweater (1952)
- Hugh Garner's Best Stories (1963; winner of the 1963 Governor General's Award)
- Men and Women (1966)
- Violation of the Virgins (1971)
- One Mile of Ice
- The Moose and the Sparrow (1966)
- The Father (1958)

=== Prose ===
- Author, Author! (1964; essays)
- One Damned Thing After Another! (1973; memoir)

== Biographical works ==
- Steuwe, Paul, 1988. The Storms Below: The Turbulent Life and Times of Hugh Garner. Toronto: James Lorimer.
