= Italian Walk of Fame =

Walk of fame in Toronto, Ontario

Coordinates: 43.6551°N 79.4147°W

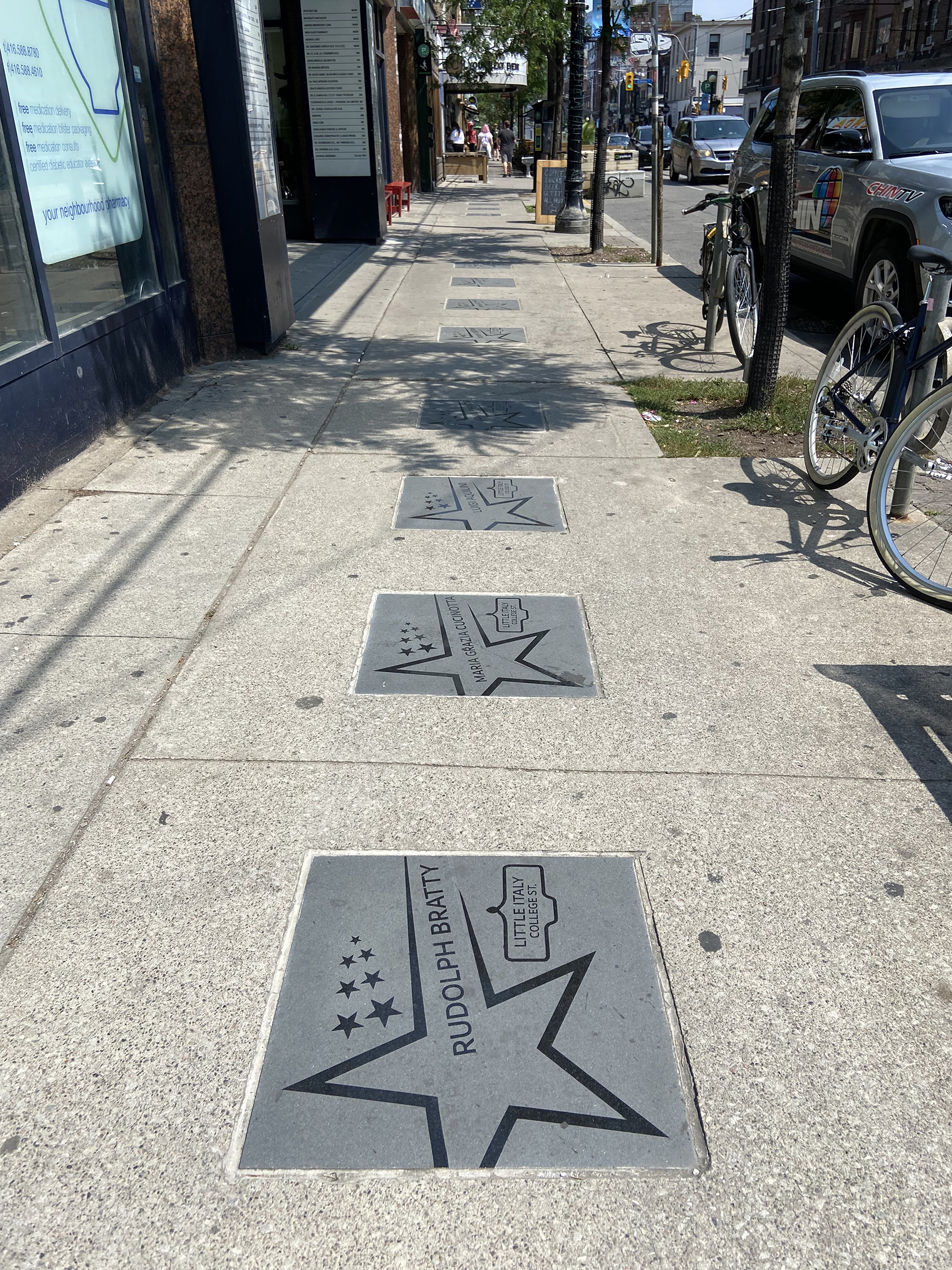
Italian Walk of Fame located north side of College Street between Grace Street and Clinton Street

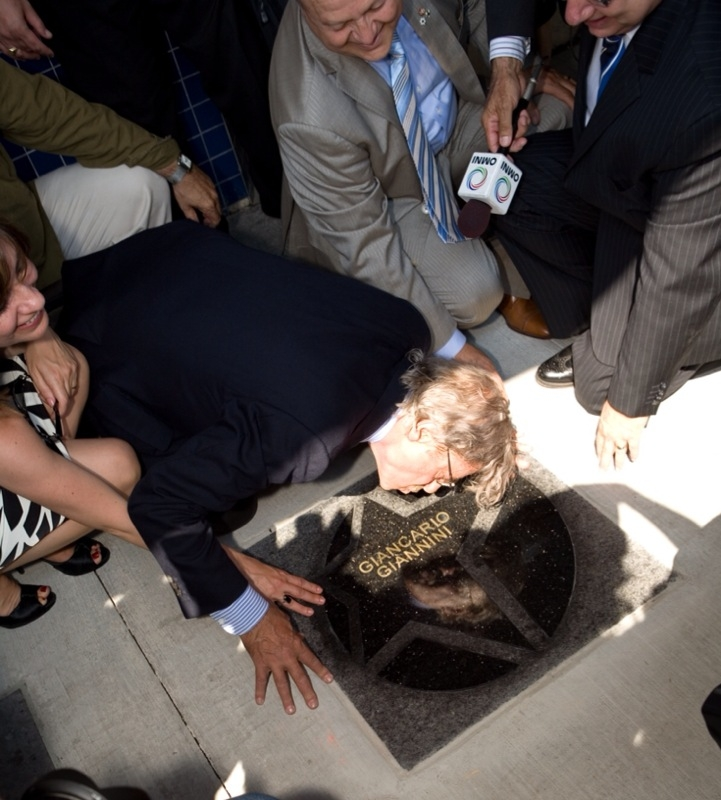
Giancarlo Giannini placing his handprint on his star at the Italian Walk of Fame

The Italian Walk of Fame (IWOF) located in Toronto, Ontario, Canada, is a walk of fame that acknowledges the achievements and accomplishments of successful persons of Italian descent. The walk of fame is located in the downtown Little Italy district. The IWOF consists of stars placed permanently and prominently in the sidewalk on the north side of College Street between Grace Street and Clinton Street.

== History ==
It was co-founded by Jimi Bertucci and Marisa Lang, and launched on September 7, 2009.

== Inductees ==
Past inductees include:

Year	Name	Area of Recognition
2009	Rudoplh Bratty	Real estate developer
2009	Phil Esposito	Hockey player
2009	Julian Fantino	Politician
2009	Connie Francis	Singer
2009	Giancarlo Giannini	Actor
2009	Johnny Lombardi	Broadcaster
2010	Armand Assante	Actor
2010	Enrico Colantoni	Actor
2010	Frank Iacobucci	Supreme Court judge
2010	Frank Mancuso Sr.	Film studio executive
2010	Dean Martin (posthumous)	Singer
2011	Luigi Aquilini	Business man
2011	Bobby Curtola	Singer
2011	Alfredo De Gasperis	Contractor/developer/builder
2011	Roberto Luongo	Hockey player
2011	Franco Nero	Actor
2011	Connie Stevens	Singer/actress
2012	Carlo Baldassarra	Business man
2012	Maria Grazia Cucinotta	Actress
2012	Beverly D'Angelo	Actress
2012	Joe Pantoliano	Actor
2013	Lou Biffis	Business man
2013	Jennifer Dale	Actress
2013	Robert Davi	Actor
2013	John Saxon (posthumous)	Actor
2014	Andy Donato	Editorial cartoonist
2014	Joseph Mancinelli	Business man
2014	Joe Mantegna	Actor
2014	Gino Vannelli	Singer

== See also ==
- Italian Canadians in the Greater Toronto Area
