= Danforth Collegiate and Technical Institute =

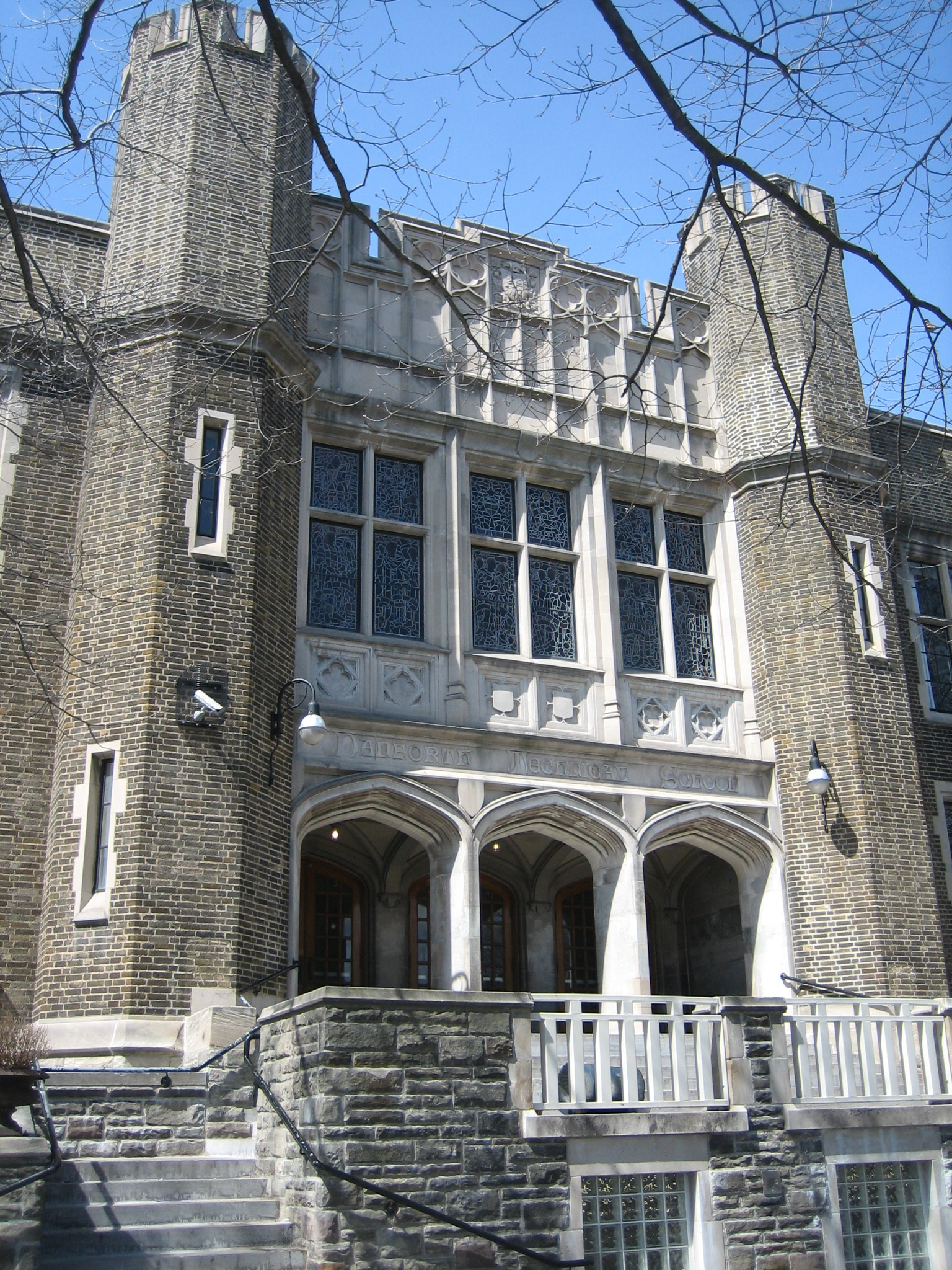

Location
- 800 Greenwood Avenue; Toronto, Ontario, M4J 4B7; Canada; 43.682759°N 79.334274°W

Information
- School type: High school
- Motto: Faciendo Discimus (We Learn by Doing)
- Founded: 1923
- School board: Toronto District School Board (Toronto Board of Education)
- Superintendent: Sohail Shaikh
- Area trustee: Michelle Aarts
- School number: 5615 / 903469
- Principal: Kevin Andrachuk
- Grades: 9-12
- Enrolment: 1340 (2022-23)
- Language: English, French, ASL
- Schedule type: Semestered
- Colours: Black, Red and White
- Team name: Danforth Red Hawks
- Yearbook: Tech Tatler (formerly), Danforth Yearbook
- Website: danforthcti.com

Danforth Collegiate and Technical Institute (known as Danforth CTI, DCTI, or simply Danforth Tech), formerly Danforth Technical School and Riverdale Branch Technical School is a secondary school in Toronto, Ontario, Canada. It is located to the east of the city's Greek neighbourhood and between the Greenwood and Donlands subway stations. As the name suggests, it is set up as a technical school, with trades training and special shops for auto repair, carpentry etc. Danforth was built as a specialist technical school in 1922, so it has a number of specialist areas and a fair stock of equipment. It is a part of the Toronto District School Board (TDSB). Prior to 1998, it was within the Toronto Board of Education (TBE). Attached to Danforth is the Toronto Urban Studies Centre, an outdoor educational school. The school's motto is "Faciendo Discimus," which means "We learn by doing."

== History ==
Originally existed in 1912 as Riverdale Branch Technical School, the building has been added to many times since it was founded in 1923, and there are sections of the school built in almost every decade of the twentieth century. Danforth has a maze-like basement. At least one basement level is permanently sealed to students creating a number of rumours about what might be down there (including a connection to the subway that runs under the school, a rifle range, and a bomb shelter). The sub-basement does in fact host the school's active Cadet Corps and National Defence course. According to the current principal the range is still mostly intact. The school has three gyms, which is remarkable in a Toronto public school, and a large 1920s auditorium which is occasionally used in films. Additional facilities include a weight room, and a swimming pool. The main school façade is Collegiate Gothic was designed by architect C.E. Cyril Dyson.

In 1932, Riverdale Tech was renamed to Danforth Technical School. It was renamed to Danforth Collegiate and Technical Institute several years later.

Danforth is known for having sent more of its students and staff to the Second World War than any other school in the British Commonwealth, and has a large stained-glass window in the library to act as its war memorial.

During World War II, the facilities of Danforth were used for Combined Operations Headquarters training.

On April 25, 2012, a 3-alarm fire occurred at the school. The fire began in the school's drama studio, and quickly spread to the adjacent music room. As of April 28, it is speculated that the cause of the blaze was arson; an investigation is currently being held by Toronto police.

Danforth is near other secondary schools (East York Collegiate Institute and Monarch Park Collegiate Institute) and is close to capacity. A number of specialist programs are held there, including special classes for students with disabilities and a number of specialist STEM courses, such as the Math, Science, and Technology ("MaST") program. As a result, Danforth draws students from a wider area of the city than most other secondary schools

Since Danforth's facilities can hold approximately 2000 pupils, the school is approaching capacity with around 1400 students at Danforth and another 250 students at Greenwood Secondary School(ESL) housed in the same building. The school became the subject of the Pupil Accommodation Review Committee set by the TDSB in November 2015.

The 2019 superhero film "Shazam!" was filmed partially around and within Danforth. Shots can be seen within the school halls, at its front entrance, and in the cafeteria.

Danforth held its centennial celebration on October 27 and October 28 of 2023. This marked the fall of 2023 as the school's 100th birthday and the 2023–2024 school year the 100th school year.

== Greenwood Secondary School ==
In 2017, students from Greenwood Secondary School moved from 24 Mountjoy Avenue to its present location at 800 Greenwood Avenue but will retain their separate school identity.

== Events ==
Danforth's Student Council a holds an annual Grade 9 Day, a day planned for the incoming grade 9's, at the beginning of the year. Grade 9 Day often consists of 9 stations, each hosted by one of the 9 Student Council members.

Danforth Collegiate hosts a Winter Holiday Show and Market Place which usually occurs the week before the winter break. Danforth's different departments often make holiday presents to sell as a fundraiser. The Drama, Music and Dance department put on the Holiday Show.

== Logos, mottos, symbols ==
The book on the top of the shield represents academics. The art utensils on the top 2 boxes in the logo represent the school's art and cosmetics programs. The gear represents the technical/engineering programs and the whistle represents athletics. For the DCTI (abbreviated) Athletics, they wear a uniform with a picture of a hawk and the name of the school on it which also represents the DCTI school.

The school’s motto is Fasciendo Discimus, which is Latin for We Learn By Doing.

== Incidents ==
On November 27, 2018, Carlo Rossi, a 61-year-old teacher at the school, was arrested and charged with sexual exploitation and invitation to sexual touching. Toronto Police stated that he engaged in inappropriate sexual conversations with a male student on school property.

== Notable alumni ==
- Ted Follows (actor), father of actress Megan Follows
- Hugh Garner (writer)
- Doug Bennett (musician)
- Andy Donato (editorial cartoonist)
- Tanveer Shahnawaz (Liberal MP for Beaches—East York)

== See also ==
- Education in Ontario
- List of secondary schools in Ontario
