= Old East York =

- Neighbourhood
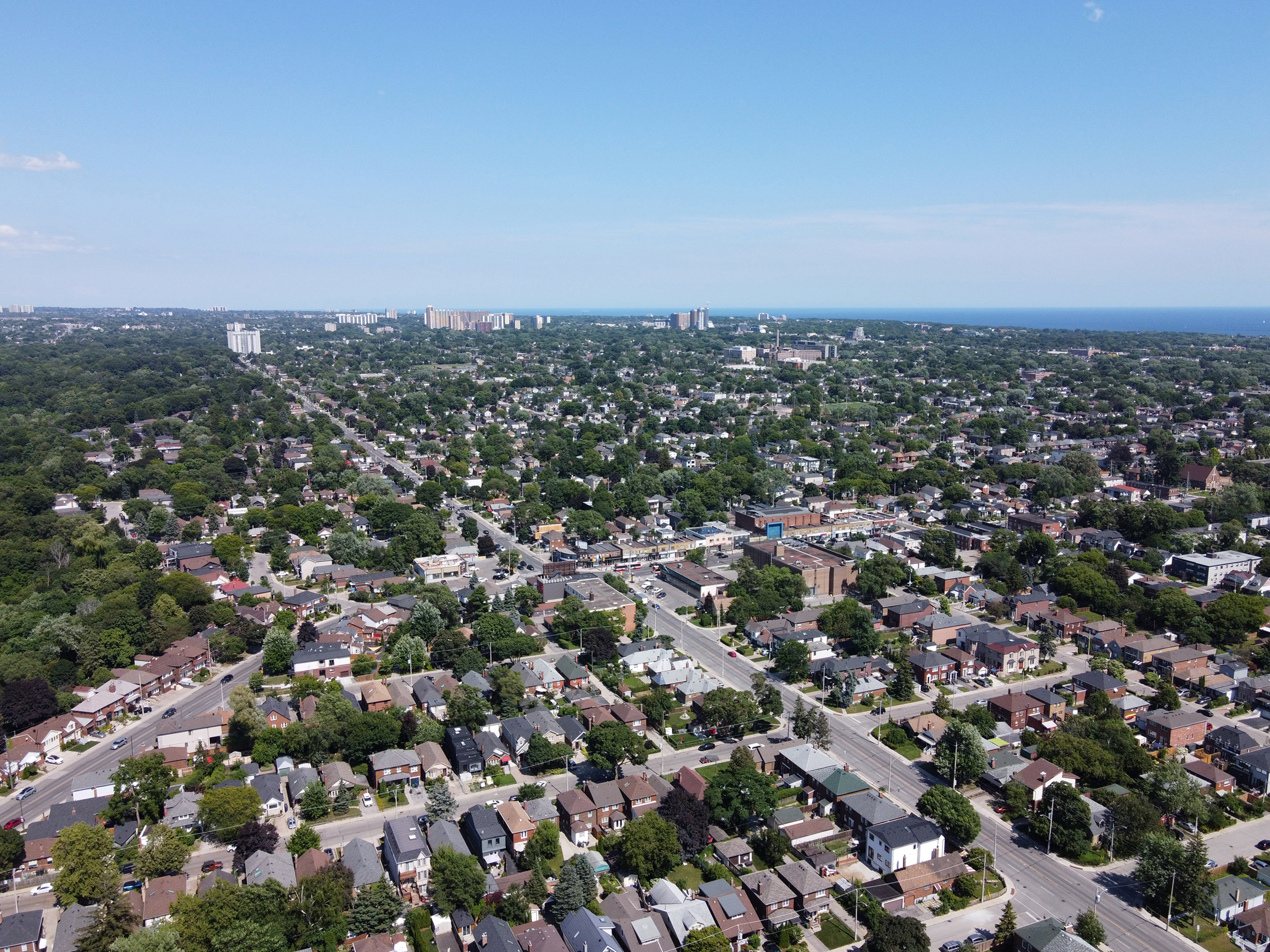
- Aerial view of Old East York near Donlands Avenue in 2023

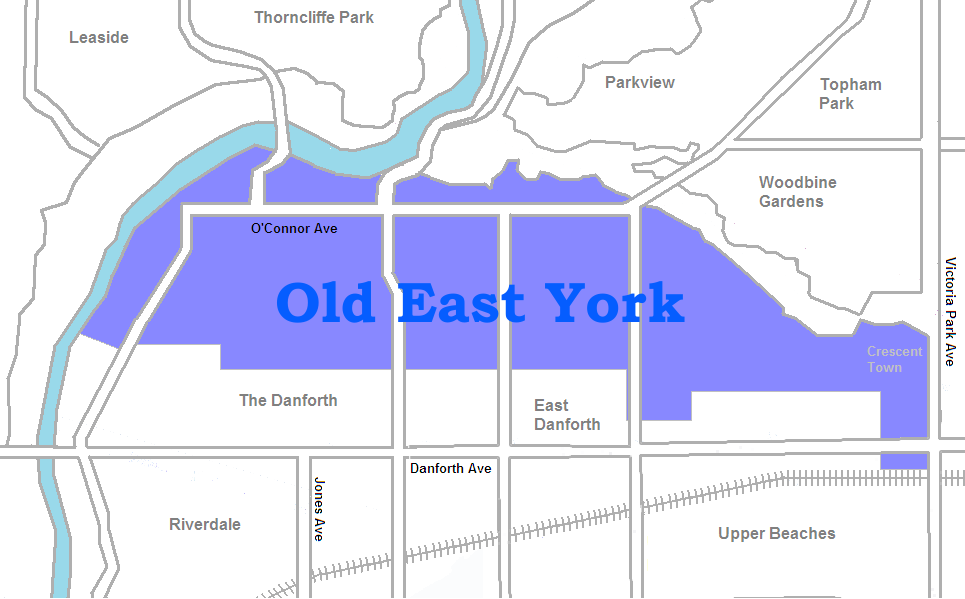
- Vicinity

- Location within Toronto
- Coordinates: 43°41′35.9″N 79°18′57″W
- Country: Canada
- Province: Ontario
- City: Toronto
- Community: Toronto & East York
- Changed Municipality: 1924 East York from York; 1998 Toronto from East York

Government
  - MP: Julie Dabrusin (Toronto—Danforth) Nate Erskine-Smith (Beaches—East York)
  - MPP: Peter Tabuns (Toronto—Danforth) Mary-Margaret McMahon (Beaches—East York)
  - Councillor: Mary Fragedakis (Ward 29 Toronto—Danforth) Brad Bradford (Ward 19 Beaches—East York)

Old East York is a district of the city of Toronto, Ontario, Canada. It consists of the southern, urban, portion of the former borough of East York. Old East York is continuous and functionally integrated with the old City of Toronto, bounded by the old municipal boundary between East York and Old Toronto on the south (which runs variably a few to several blocks north of Danforth Avenue), by the Don River Valley on the west and northwest, by Taylor-Massey Creek on the north, and Victoria Park Avenue in the east.

Most of Old East York, particularly south of Cosburn, was constructed before World War II in a traditionally urban, pedestrian-oriented block pattern. Originally populated by immigrants of predominantly British and Irish descent, Old East York is now home to a wide range of ethnicities, including people of Greek, Bangladeshi, and Chinese descent. Old East York can be divided into several smaller neighbourhoods.

== Neighbourhoods ==
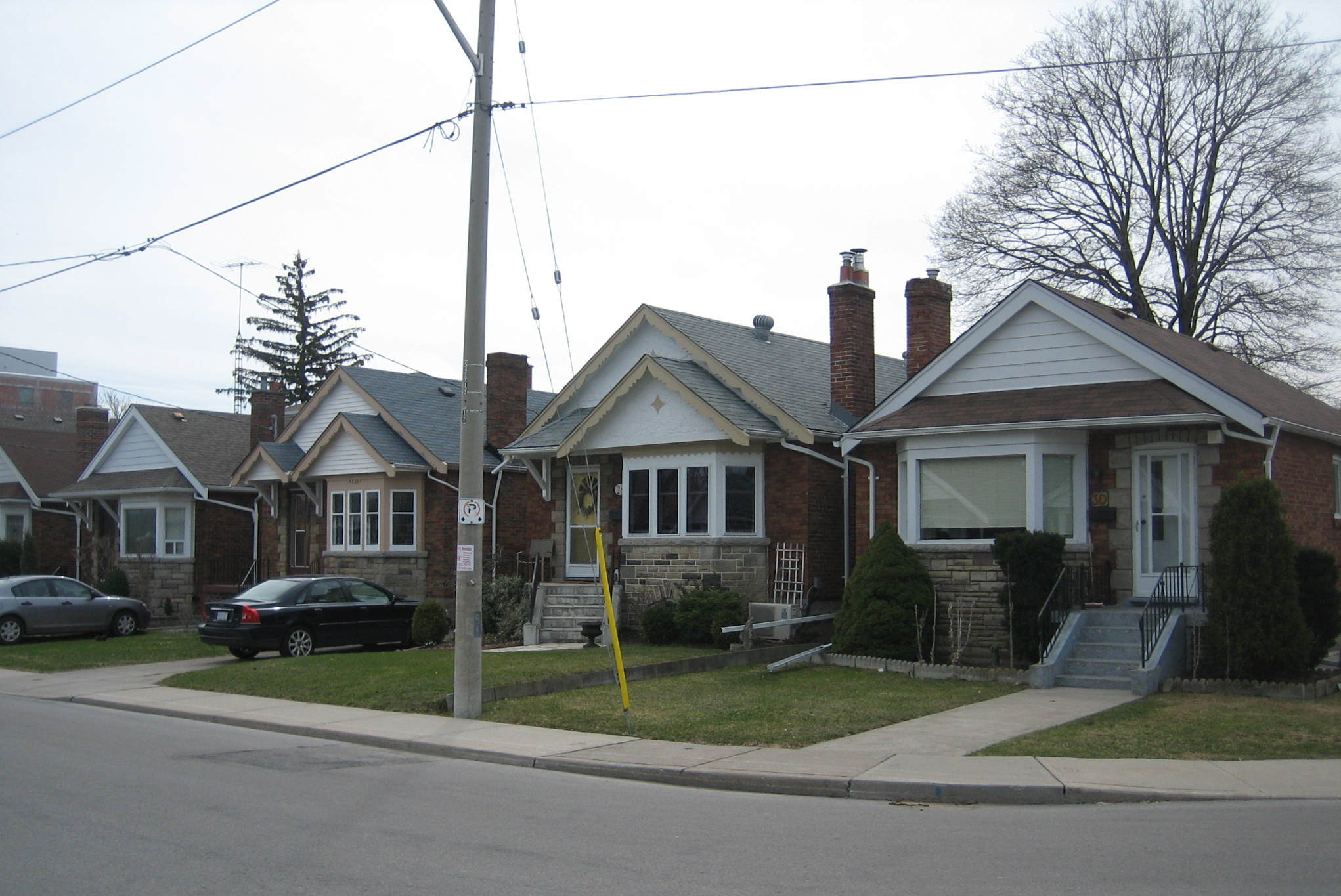
Post-war bungalows are prevalent in the far northern extremities of Old East York.

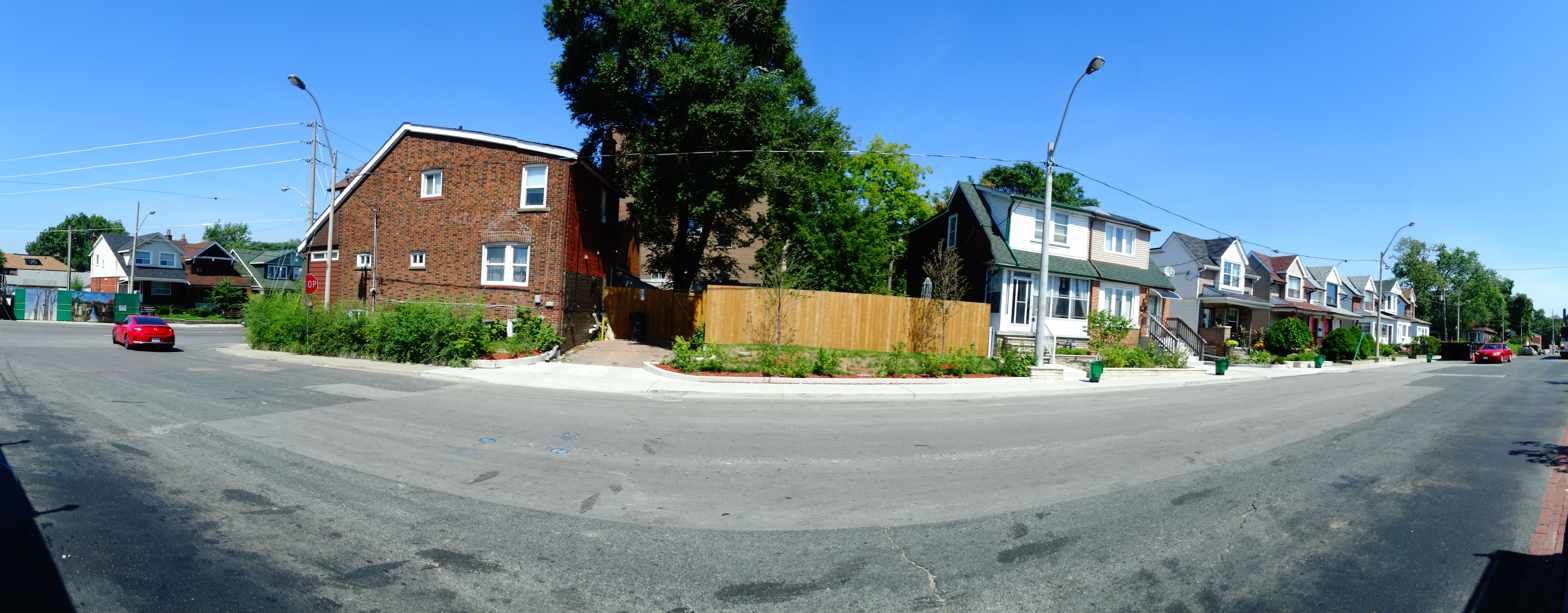
Woodbine Heights from Woodbine station. The area is an Edwardian era neighbourhood that straddles parts of Old East York and Old Toronto.

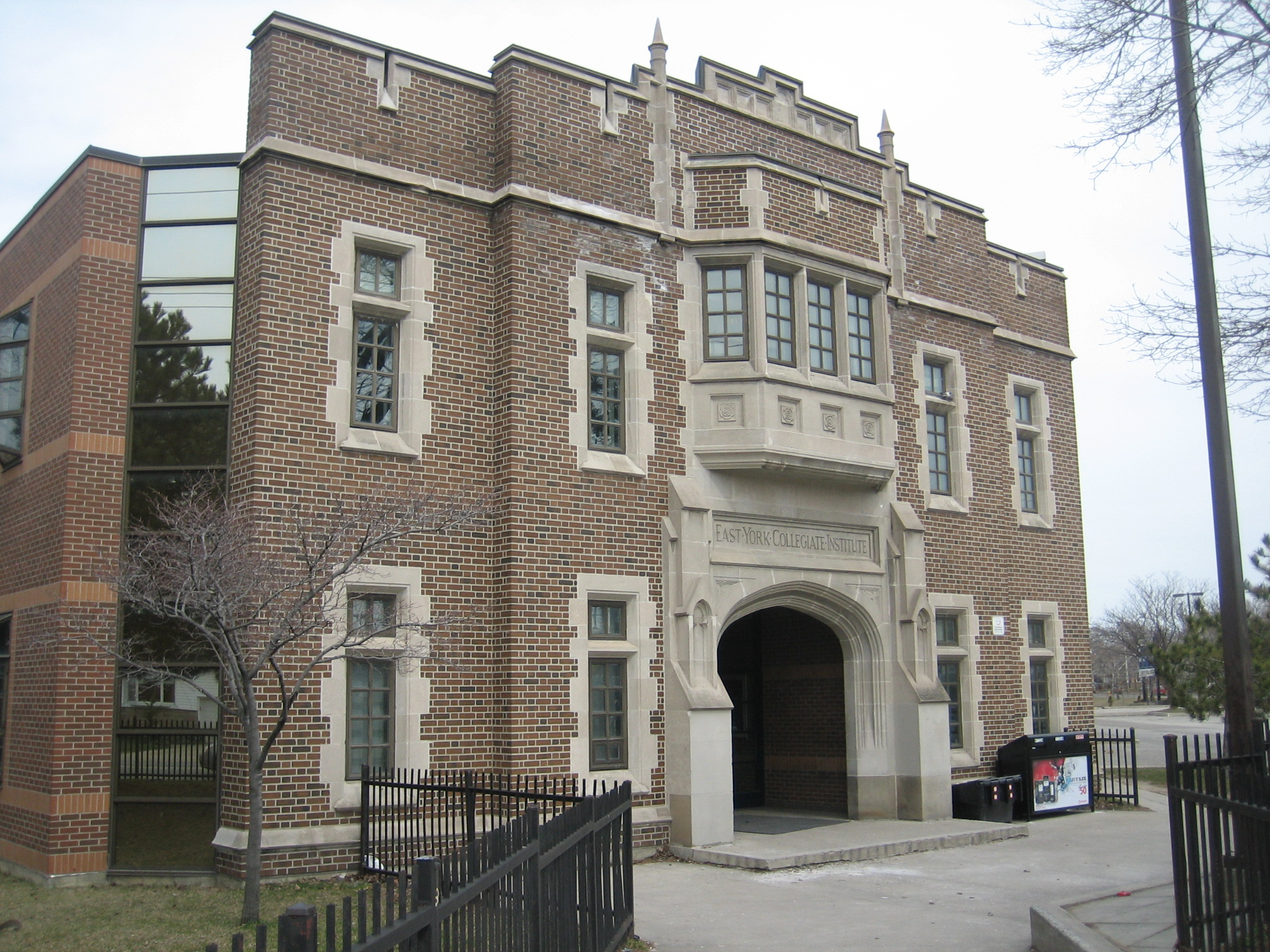
East York Collegiate Institute is a public secondary school operated by the Toronto District School Board.

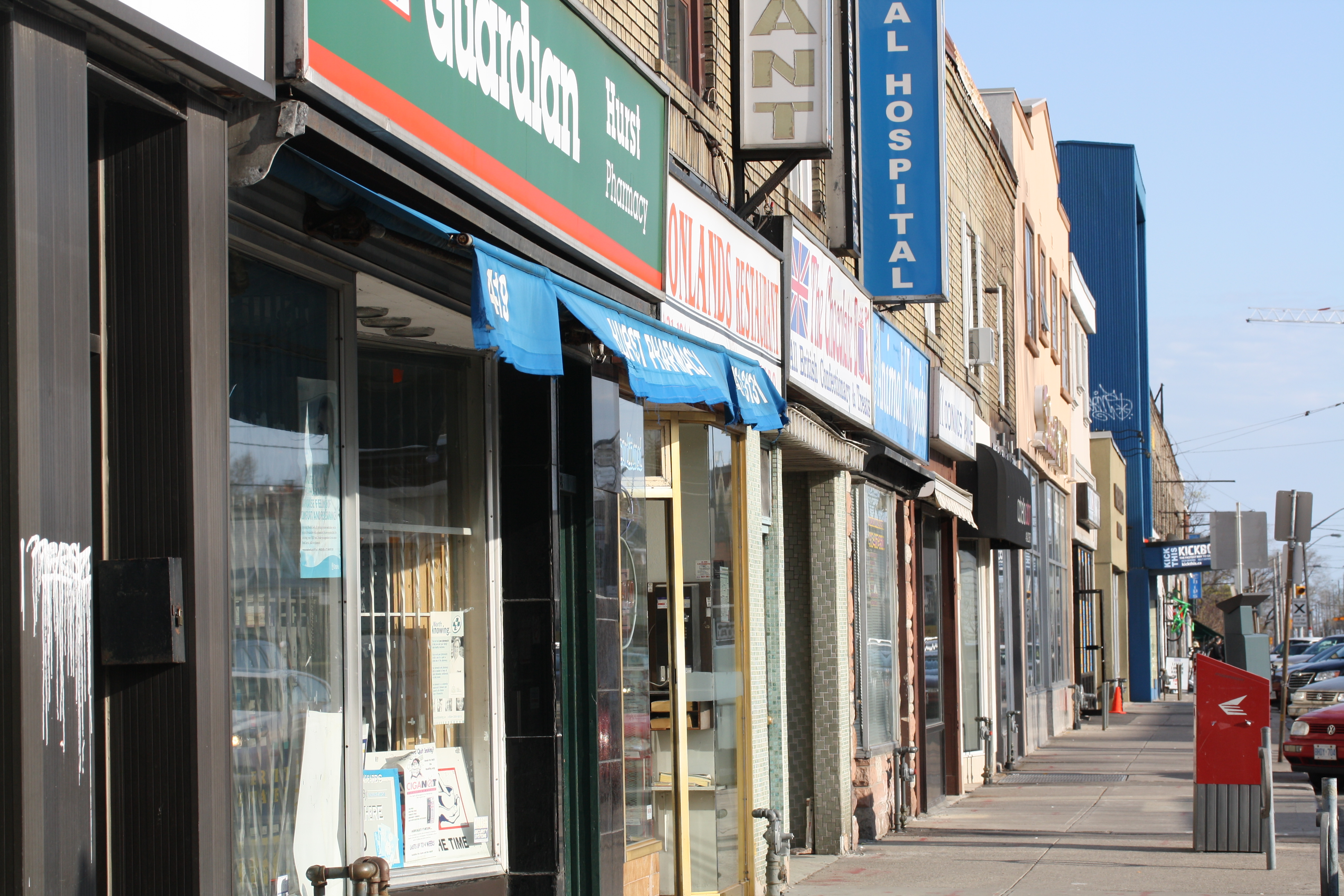
Streetscape of Old East York from O'Connor Drive and Donlands Avenue in 2010

=== Broadview North ===
Broadview North is located at the western end of Old East York bordered by Pape Avenue to the East, Chesterhill and Fulton to the South and the DVP to the west and north. The area is dominated by renters and high rise buildings. There are numerous low income buildings in the area, however, renting (at over 70%) is certainly the norm in this area. However at the very north the area contains many bungalows, many of which are being redone into 2-storey houses because of the decent area and the considerably low housing price. The area has significant Greek and Serbian populations.

=== Crescent Town ===
Crescent Town is at the eastern end of Old East York and was founded on the former site of the Crescent School to take advantage of the adjacent Victoria Park station.

From 1933 to 1969 Crescent School an independent private boys school was located on lands donated by Susan Massey, wife of Walter Massey, who was head his family’s firm Massey Ferguson.

Crescent Town is a diverse, multicultural neighbourhood. Its population includes significant Bengali, Jamaican, Pakistani, and Tamil Canadian communities. The neighbourhood features a variety of housing types, including mid-rise apartment buildings, Victorian mansions, high-rise condominiums, Edwardian workers' cottages, and 1920s Craftsman-style homes.

The adjoining section of Danforth Avenue, stretching from Victoria Park Avenue to Main Street, has a high concentration of Bangladeshi grocery stores, restaurants, clothing shops, and entertainment venues.

Taylor Massey Creek is parkland and home to Children’s Peace Theatre, located in the Massey-Goulding Estate, home built in 1921 for Dorothy (Massey) Goulding, daughter of Walter Massey and Susan Denton.

=== Dentonia Park ===
Dentonia Park is at the eastern edge of Old East York and is located south of Crescent Town, west of Victoria Park, north of the Danforth and generally east of either Main or Dawes (west of Dawes towards Main and beyond is sometimes referred to as :Woodbine Lumsden"). There is an athletic field and park known as Dentonia Park Athletic Field and a street known as Dentonia Park Avenue in the neighbourhood plus a golf course named Dentonia Park Golf Course just across Victoria Park to the northeast.

The park is bordered to the north by Taylor Massey Creek Hydro Corridor which once was the tracks for Canadian Northern Ontario Railway.

=== Glebe Land/Danforth Village ===
Glebe Land/Danforth Village is located in the central section of Old East York. Much of the central section of what became East York was first set aside as 'Clergy Reserves', called 'Glebe Land', a hotly debated feature of the original system of land granting in Ontario which retained land for the use of the church. Arguments over which church should have the use of this land led to the eventual sale of the clergy reserves, most of which had remained undeveloped for many years as surrounding areas were cleared and built on. The clergy lots between Donlands (originally a part of Leslie Street) and Woodbine only began to be developed after the construction of the Prince Edward Viaduct and Leslie Bridge and successful development of the old Todmorden postal village west of Donlands as Pape Village. Given the central location of this within the former East York and the presence of both the former East York Municipal Office and East York Collegiate on its eastern edge (Cosburn Avenue), this is an area that is often just referred to as "East York" or "Old East York".

=== Pape Village ===
Pape Village is a commercial district in the eastern portion of Old East York along Pape Avenue. It has mixed-use shopping street, consisting mainly of small-scale retail, restaurant and personal service uses.

=== Todmorden Village ===
Todmorden Village is located north of O'Connor, at the very edge of Old East York. Much of the village lies atop the Don Valley Ravine which is lined with forest. Mature trees are a big presence in this area of the neighbourhood. Where Pape and the Donlands head north past O'Connor is an area consisting of few streets and homes.

=== Woodbine Heights ===
Woodbine Heights is an Edwardian neighbourhood, straddling parts of Old East York and old Toronto. It is bounded by Coxwell on the West, Main on the East, the Taylor-Massey Creek Ravine on the north and Danforth on the south. Aside from the Danforth, its main foci are the "East York Village", located Coxwell Avenue, north of Mortimer, and the Woodbine Village, centered on the intersection of Woodbine and Mortimer. While Woodbine Heights is situated to the east of the Glebe Lands, it was actually developed earlier, around the railway station and horse-racing facilities at Main and Danforth. This area was known as being the original homestead of the Smith clan, starting with Reuben Smith in the 1920s, followed by his son Thomas and the remainder of his extended family. Housing stock and street patterns at that time were chiefly of Edwardian design, and are typified by distinctive, narrow-lot variants of the Dutch Colonial Revival, Classical, and Cotswold styles. Notable landmarks include the Toronto East General Hospital (Sammon & Woodington) a full-service teaching hospital founded in 1929, the Woodbine Heights Royal Canadian Legion (Woodbine-Barker), the Church of the Resurrection (Woodbine & Milverton), founded in 1912 and the Gledhill Public School (Gledhill-King Edward) built 1917. As late as 2010, this neighborhood was dominated by middle-aged residents and retirees. It is currently undergoing rapid social transformation, with an influx of young families attracted to car-free city living, and character-filled, yet affordable, Edwardian homes. As a result of the influx, the area is experiencing a significant replacement of its original single story homes with larger multi-story family homes.

== Landmarks ==
- East York Civic Centre
- East York Collegiate Institute
- Michael Garron Hospital

== Government ==
The area west of Coxwell Avenue is the federal and provincial riding of Toronto—Danforth and Ward 29, the area east of Coxwell is the federal and provincial riding of Beaches—East York and Ward 31.

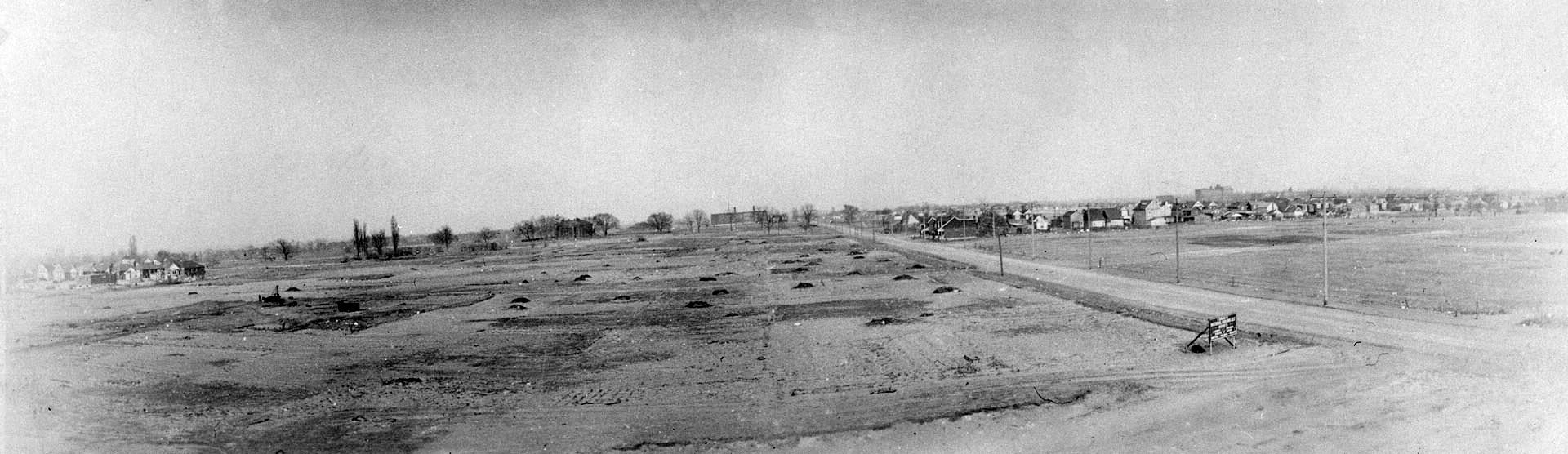
Looking east on Cosburn Avenue from Greenwood Avenue, 1942. Houses on Linsmore Crescent are on right; background centre is East York Collegiate, and background right is Michael Garron Hospital.
