= Pape Village =

- Commercial district
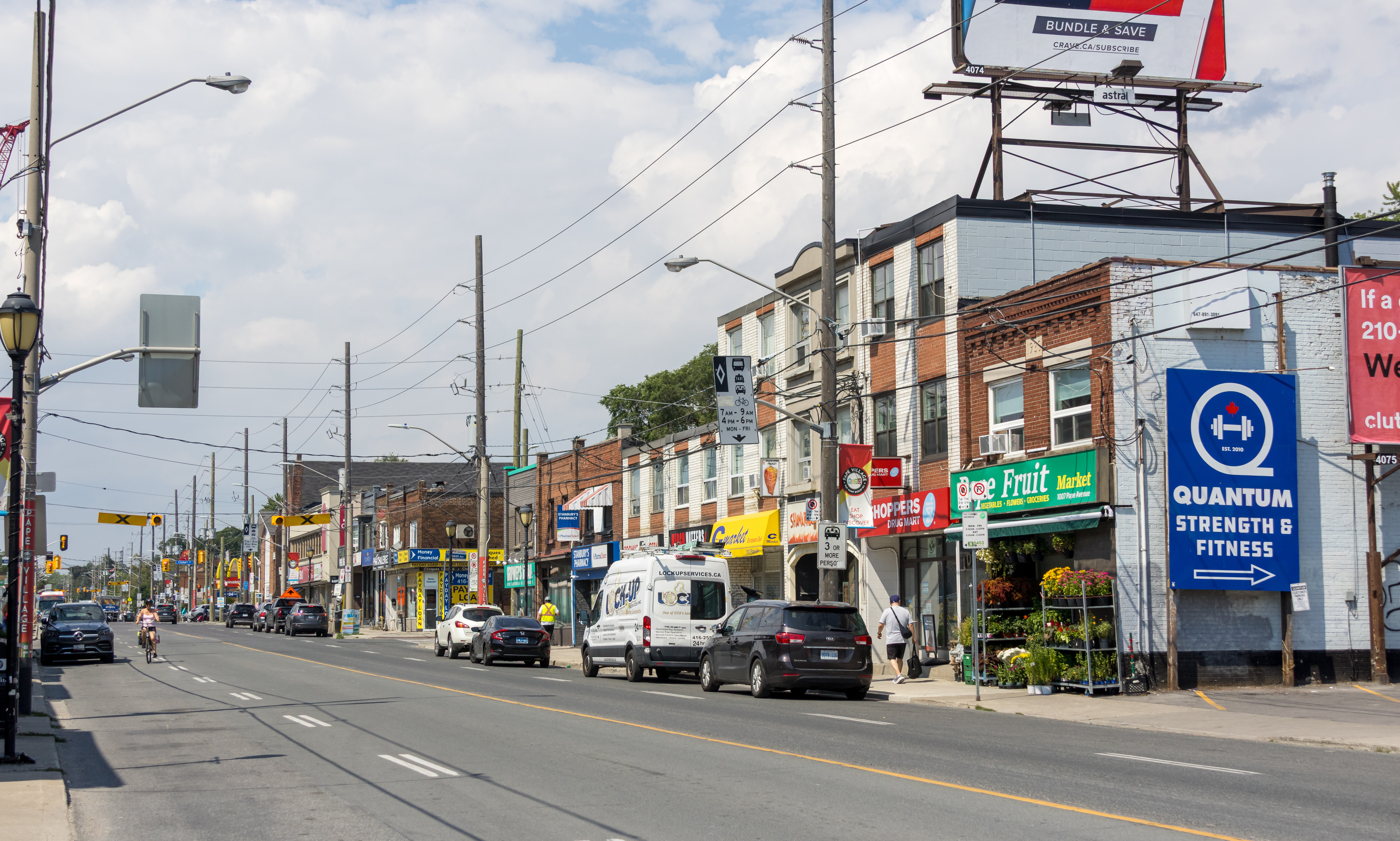
- Pape Village along Pape Avenue in 2026

- Location within Toronto
- Coordinates: 43°41′15″N 79°20′52″W
- Country: Canada
- Province: Ontario
- City: Toronto
- Community: Toronto & East York
- Changed Municipality: 1924 East York from York; 1998 Toronto fromEast York

Government
  - MP: Julie Dabrusin (Toronto—Danforth)
  - MPP: Peter Tabuns (Toronto—Danforth)
  - Councillor: Mary Fragedakis (Ward 29 Toronto—Danforth)

Pape Village is a commercial district in Toronto, Ontario, Canada, located within the neighbourhood of Old East York. It is a mixed-use shopping street, consisting mainly of small-scale retail, restaurant and personal service uses.

== Location ==
The district is located along Pape Avenue, between Mortimer Avenue and Gamble Avenue, in the former Borough of East York. The Danforth is located several blocks to the south, and the Don Valley is located several blocks to the west and north.

Although the Pape Village name was originally the product of local business marketing efforts, some real estate agents and local residents have since used the term to also refer to the adjacent residential area. Otherwise, the area is generally known as Old East York.

== Business Improvement Area ==
The Pape Village Business Improvement Area represents approximately 110 businesses along the thoroughfare, and undertakes efforts to promote and beautify the area. Since much of the existing building stock in Pape Village dates to the 1940s and 1950s, the City of Toronto adopted a new community improvement plan for the district in 2003, in order to assist local businesses to renovate and restore aging commercial façades.

== History ==
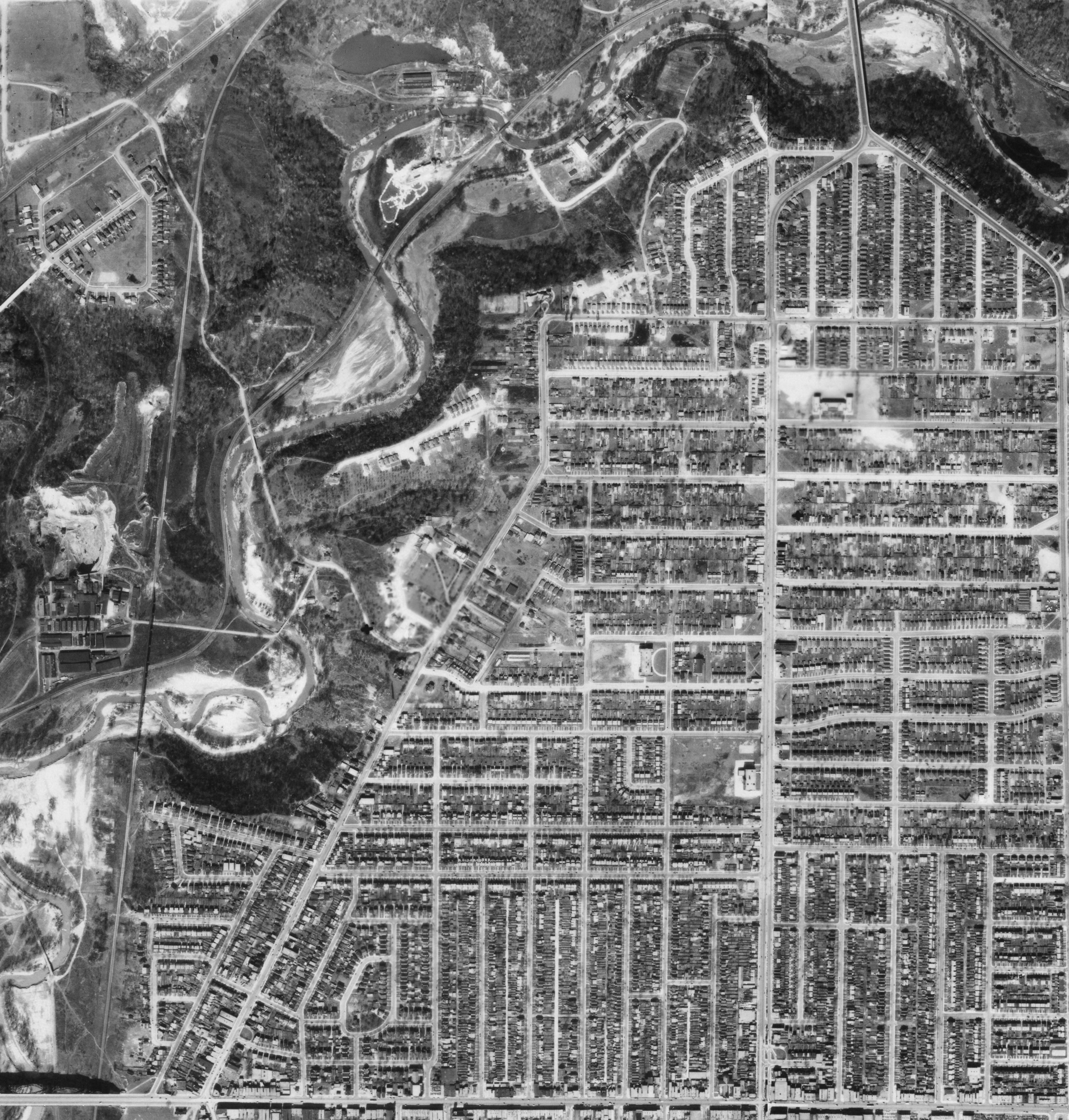
Aerial Photograph, 1942

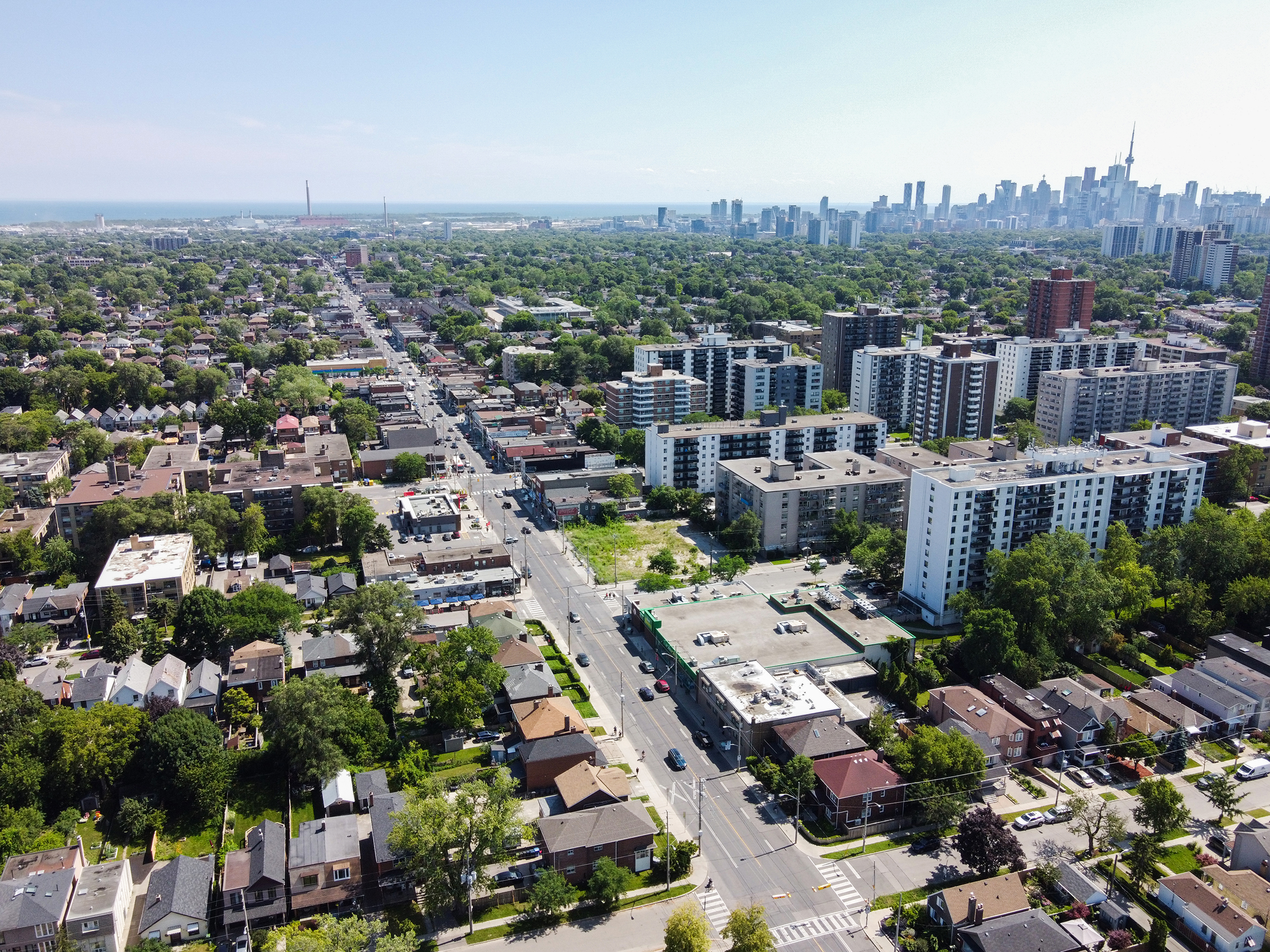
Aerial view of Pape Village, 2023

Historically, the entire area was known as "Todmorden", which extended from the Don Valley to the west and north, to approximately what is now Mortimer Avenue to the south and Donlands Avenue to the east. Todmorden was named by John Eastwood, an early settler in the early 19th century, who believed the landscape was reminiscent of Todmorden in Yorkshire, England. Although Todmorden was never incorporated as a village, the use of the name both colloquially and as a postal address persisted until the 1940s. Today, the name is used solely for three areas of this community Todmorden Mills, a historic industrial settlement in the Don Valley, for a library reference room in the East York Community Centre on Pape Avenue as well as a small street linking Cosburn avenue and Gamble Avenue, its name "Todmorden Lane".

The band Rush reference the area in the instrumental "La Villa Strangiato" from the album Hemispheres (1978), in which section VII is subtitled "Danforth & Pape".
