= East York Collegiate Institute =

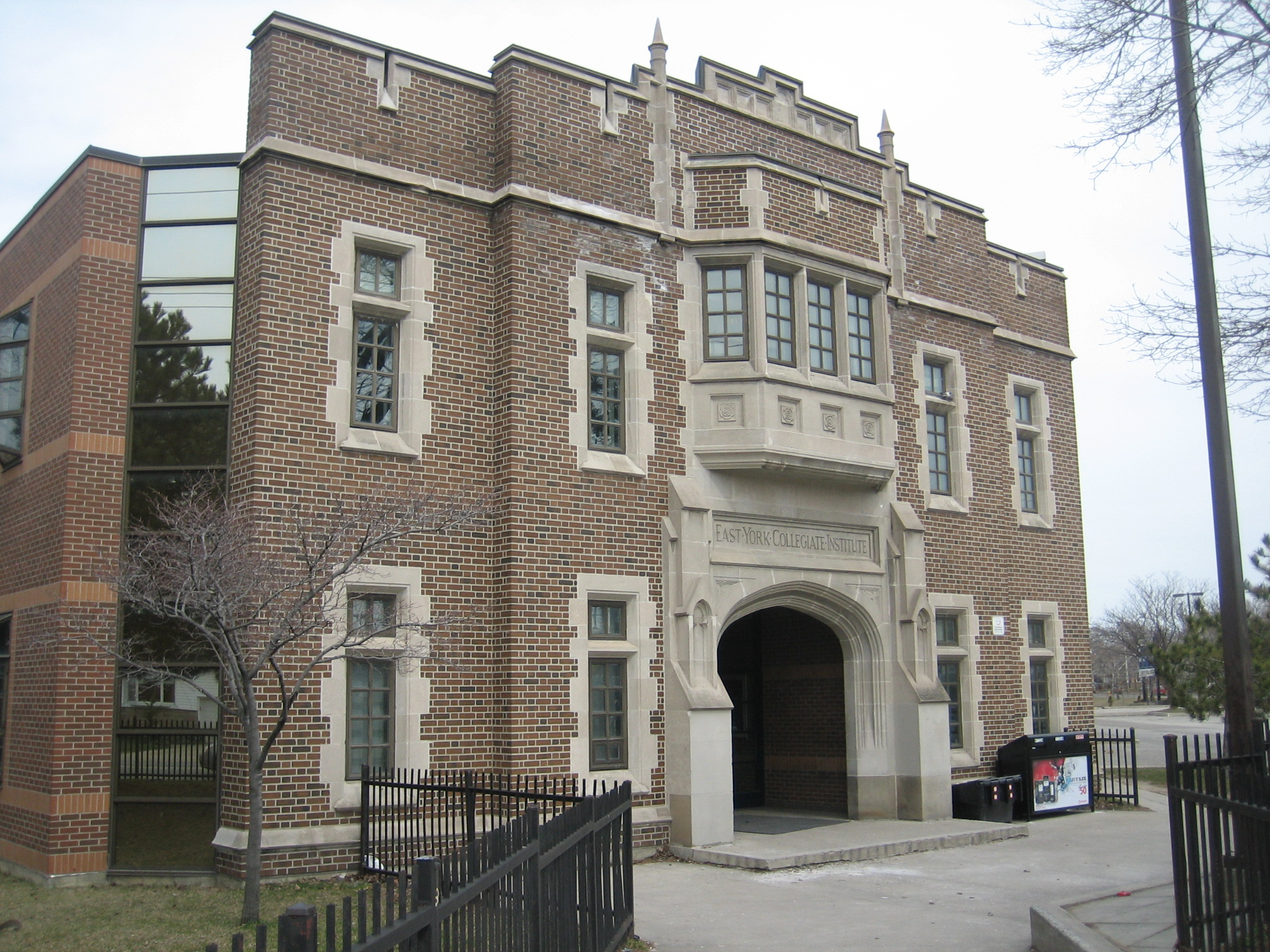
- East York C.I. front facade, after the 1988 reconstruction

Location
- 650 Cosburn Avenue; Toronto, Ontario, M4C 2V2; Canada; 43°41′41.20″N 79°19′40″W

Information
- Former name: East York High School
- School type: Public High school
- Motto: Honos Per Ministrium (Honour through Service)
- Founded: October 3, 1927; 99 years ago
- School board: Toronto District School Board (East York Board of Education)
- Superintendent: Kwame Lennon; FOS 16
- Area trustee: N/A; Ward 16
- School number: 1924 / 906840
- Principal: Stephen Morris
- Grades: 9-12
- Enrolment: 1275 (2024-2026)
- Language: English
- Colours: Blue and Gold
- Mascot: Trogo
- Team name: East York Trojans; East York Goliaths; East York Athenas
- Rival: Leaside High School
- Website: schoolweb.tdsb.on.ca/eastyork

East York Collegiate Institute (East York CI, EYCI, or East York), formerly East York High School is a public high-school in Toronto, Ontario, Canada. It is located in the former borough of East York at the corner of Coxwell and Cosburn Avenues. It was part of the East York Board of Education until 1998 when the board became part of the Toronto District School Board. Its motto is "Honos Per Ministrium" (Honour through Service).

== History ==
In 1924, East York had no high schools, and students of the Town were not permitted to attended schools in neighbouring communities. As a result, East York council purchased five acres of farmland (clergy reserve lands) from the Protestant clergy at a cost of $3,800 an acre and hired architect George Roper Gouinlock, son of George Wallace Gouinlock, to design the new school. In July 1926, George Stewart Henry laid the first foundations of the new building which was officially opened by Ontario Premier Howard Ferguson as East York High School on October 3, 1927 with an initial enrolment of almost 100 students. Prior to the opening of the school, students were being taught in the basement of Danforth Park school; this initial enrollment came from this basement classroom. Designed in the Collegiate Gothic style, it soon merged with a local vocational school and extended the building capacity. It gained its current name of East York Collegiate Institute in 1930 to better reflect the school's academic focus.

In 1940, an additional five acres was purchased east of the school from the Anglican Church synod to use as a playing field for the school. Following the passage of the provincial Physical Fitness Act in 1945, which allocated money to municipalities to create community recreation programs, a stadium was constructed on this field which eventually opened in 1948, planned by East York's Community Centres Committee and Director of Recreation Stan Wadlow. A softball backstop was also added to the school's field around this time. Other additions to the school, such as the auditorium, double gym, and classrooms were added during the 1950s and 1960s.

The school was a particularly notable community hub during the first half of its life and served as the main school in East York. World War II rallies, community fundraisers, and qualifying events for the British Empire Games were held on school grounds. The school was often a site of public meetings for East York council and other community organizations, and also hosted several sporting events and competitions. At one point following the 1945 legislation, a rifle shooting range was built in the basement of the school for the East York Rifle and Revolver club. In 1960, the first annual community-wide Canada Day (then Dominion Day) celebrations were held on the school’s stadium grounds.

In 1977, the school was visited by Prime Minister of Canada Pierre Trudeau.

In 1988, East York Collegiate received major renovations such as the new wing in the north and south, and a second double gym costed at $9.9-million in a similar manner to Scarborough's R.H. King Collegiate Institute during their renovations in 1976. Save for the entrance arch, the original school and components of the building were demolished and now serve as a parking lot. The modern school was designed by architects Page and Steele.

East York Collegiate Institute implemented a school uniform policy in 2002 but decided to remove it in 2023.

== School life ==
=== Sports and athletics ===
EYCI has an athletics program, with strong showings by its Senior Boys' Hockey team, Varsity Girls' Hockey team (who made it to OFSAA in 2008–09 and 2011–12), as well as both the Junior and Senior Boys' Soccer squads. Historically from the 1950s to the 1980s, the school was a perennial powerhouse in Canadian-rules Football (York League) and Baseball (TSSAA). The Senior Boys Cross Country team also qualified for OFSAA in the Fall of 2009 and 2010. The Girls Junior Basketball team won the city championship in 2009–10.

More recently, the Varsity Girls' Outdoor Soccer team won back to back City Championships and qualified for OFSAA in the 2018–19 and 2021-2022 seasons.

The East York men's football team, the Goliaths, have served as a long-standing symbol of the community. In the 1970s, East York council adopted a puppy bulldog in honour of the Borough's 50th anniversary, which was subsequently named Goliath after the EYCI team.

=== Co-curricular programs ===
==== Robotics ====
Since 2002, East York Collegiate Institute has been involved with the FIRST Robotics Competition FIRST Robotics, an international competition in which professionals and high school students are teamed together to solve an engineering design problem in an intense yet cooperative way. In 2002, the East York FIRST Robotics Team won the Highest Rookie Seed Award in recognition of the Highest Placed Rookie of Robotics in Canada [7]. In 2011, East York's Team 907, placed in the Semi-Finals at the Greater Toronto Area Regional and placed twice again in the Semi-Finals at Greater Toronto Regional East and the Greater Toronto Regional West in 2012. East York also won the Creativity Award for their 2012 Robot.

===== Outreach =====
East York's Outreach initiative emphasizes local and national opportunities that take an experiential learning and community service approach. East York's Team 907 has undertaken many outreach projects in Toronto, including mentoring the younger Robotics Teams located in the Greater Toronto Area.

=== Middle School feeders ===
Feeder schools for East York Collegiate include Cosburn Middle School, Westwood Middle School (formerly Westwood Junior High), D.A. Morrison Middle School (formerly Oak Park Junior High) and G.A. Brown Middle School (formerly St. Clair Junior High).

== Notable alumni ==
- Themi Antonoglou, soccer player
- Sharon Bruneau, bodybuilder and actress
- Rich Butler, baseball player
- Rob Butler, baseball player
- Ben Chin, news anchor
- David Collenette, former Cabinet Minister
- Chris Diamantopoulos, actor
- Peter Gastis, soccer player
- Jan de Vries, World War II paratrooper
- Mike Del Grande, former Toronto City councillor
- Tony Featherstone, NHL player
- Mike Holmes, home contractor and television show host
- Argiris Karras, actor
- Chris Kotsopoulos, NHL player
- Peter Mahovlich, NHL player
- Nelson Martin, CFL football player and coach
- Joe Motiki, TV actor, host and radio announcer
- Cam Newton, NHL goaltender
- Fred Sgambati, journalist
- Tim Sims, actor and comedian
- Glenn Smith, NHL player
- Still Life Still, indie rock band
- Barry Stroud (philosopher)
- Brandon Tanev, NHL player
- Christopher Tanev, NHL player
- Steph Tolev, comedian
- Nick Volpe, football player
- Elizabeth Weir, lawyer and former leader of the New Brunswick NDP
- Mike Wilmot, comedian
- Theo Zagar, soccer player

== See also ==
- Education in Ontario
- List of secondary schools in Ontario
