= Leaside High School =

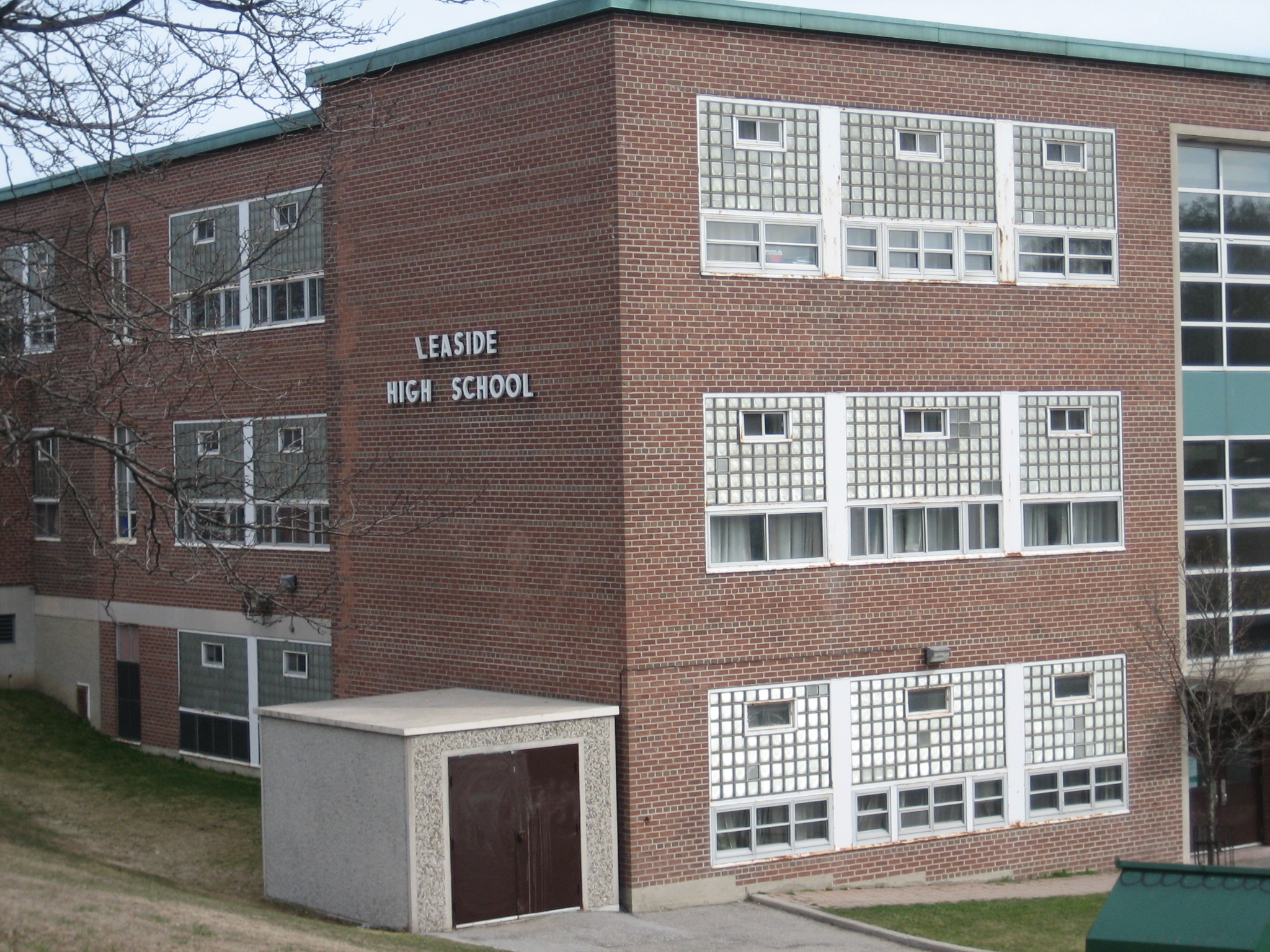
- Leaside High School

Location
- 200 Hanna Road; Toronto, Ontario, M4G 3N9; Canada; 43.7112°N 79.3731°W

Information
- School type: High school
- Motto: "Seas Gu Dileas" (Stand Faithfully)
- Founded: 1945
- School board: Toronto District School Board (East York Board of Education)
- Principal: Rosanna Kerigan
- Grades: 9-12
- Enrolment: 1,100
- Language: English, French
- Campus: Urban
- Area: Leaside
- Colours: Black, green and gold
- Mascot: Lance Lancer
- Nickname: Lancers
- Newspaper: The Leaside Chronicle
- Website: schoolweb.tdsb.on.ca/leasidehs

Leaside High School is a school of between 900 and 1000 pupils in central-east Toronto, Ontario, Canada, at the corner of Eglinton and Bayview Avenues. The school was established in 1945 by the Leaside Board of Education and is located in the Leaside neighbourhood. Prior to 1998, this school was part of the legacy East York Board of Education.

Feeder schools for Leaside High School include Bessborough Public School, Bennington Heights Public School, Northlea Public School, and Rolph Road Public School. The school houses the French immersion program from Cosburn Middle School and Northlea E.M.S, along with the Extended French program from Milne Valley Middle School, Cosburn Middle School, and Valley Park Middle School.

In late 2006, Leaside High was rated "Best Toronto School for Languages" by Toronto Life magazine, featuring courses in French, Spanish, Italian and others.

== Notable alumni ==
- Peter Adjey, athlete
- Will Arnett, actor
- Margaret Atwood, author
- Laura Bertram, actress
- Mike Bradwell, former Canadian football wide receiver and Grey Cup champion
- Edwin, musician
- Terry Fallis, author
- Warren Hill, musician
- Jeff Jones, bass player
- Susan Li, journalist
- Nathaniel G. Moore, author
- Brooke Nevin, actress
- Zach Edey, NBA basketball (Memphis Grizzlies)
- Micha Powell, Canadian Sprinter
- Michael Coteau, Canadian MP
- Brentyn Hall, Football Player
- Weagbe Mombo, Football Player
- Taimour Khan, Cricket Player

== See also ==
- Education in Ontario
- List of secondary schools in Ontario
