= East York Board of Education =

Former public school board

Board of Education for the City of East York

Location
- 840 Coxwell Avenue; East York, Ontario M4C 5T2 Canada

District information
- Established: 1936
- Closed: December 31, 1997
- Chair of the board: Gail Nyberg
- District ID: EYBE

East York Board of Education (EYBE), officially the Board of Education for the Borough of East York is a former school board which administered the school district of the Toronto suburb of East York, Ontario. The board was formed in 1936 and absorbed the Leaside Board of Education when Leaside was annexed into East York in 1967. As of 1990, it was the smallest school board in Metropolitan Toronto.

In 1998, the EYBE was dissolved, its administration transferred to the Toronto District School Board. The headquarters of the school board was located on 840 Coxwell Avenue attached to R.H. McGregor Elementary School and was sold to Toronto East General Hospital in 2011.

== History ==
In 1965 the district presented a resolution to the Ontario Public School Trustees' Association asking the Canadian federal government to install a Ministry of Education; the association supported the proposal.

In 1992 the district board of trustees did not take action on a plan to install condom machines at the district high schools.

In 1993 the school board banned The Valour and the Horror from most classrooms, saying that it had reservations about the series' accuracy. As of September 11, 1993 it was the only board in Metropolitan Toronto to take a public stance on the series.

The last term of trustees, from 1994 to 1998, had a number of budding politicians within its ranks. These included Gail Nyberg who has gone on to administer the Daily Bread Food Bank, Jane Pitfield who would later serve as a city councilor and run, unsuccessfully as Mayor of Toronto and the future leader of the Communist Party of Canada, Elizabeth Rowley.

== Schools ==
Marc Garneau Collegiate Institute

Schools at time of closure:

- Secondary schools
  - East York Collegiate Institute
  - Marc Garneau Collegiate Institute
  - Leaside High School
- Middle
  - Cosburn Middle School
  - Westwood Middle School
- Elementary
  - R.H. McGregor Elementary School
  - Chester Elementary School
  - William Burgess Elementary School

== Curriculum ==
In 1990 the district planned to offer classes teaching Japanese and Mandarin Chinese.
