= List of educational institutions in Etobicoke =

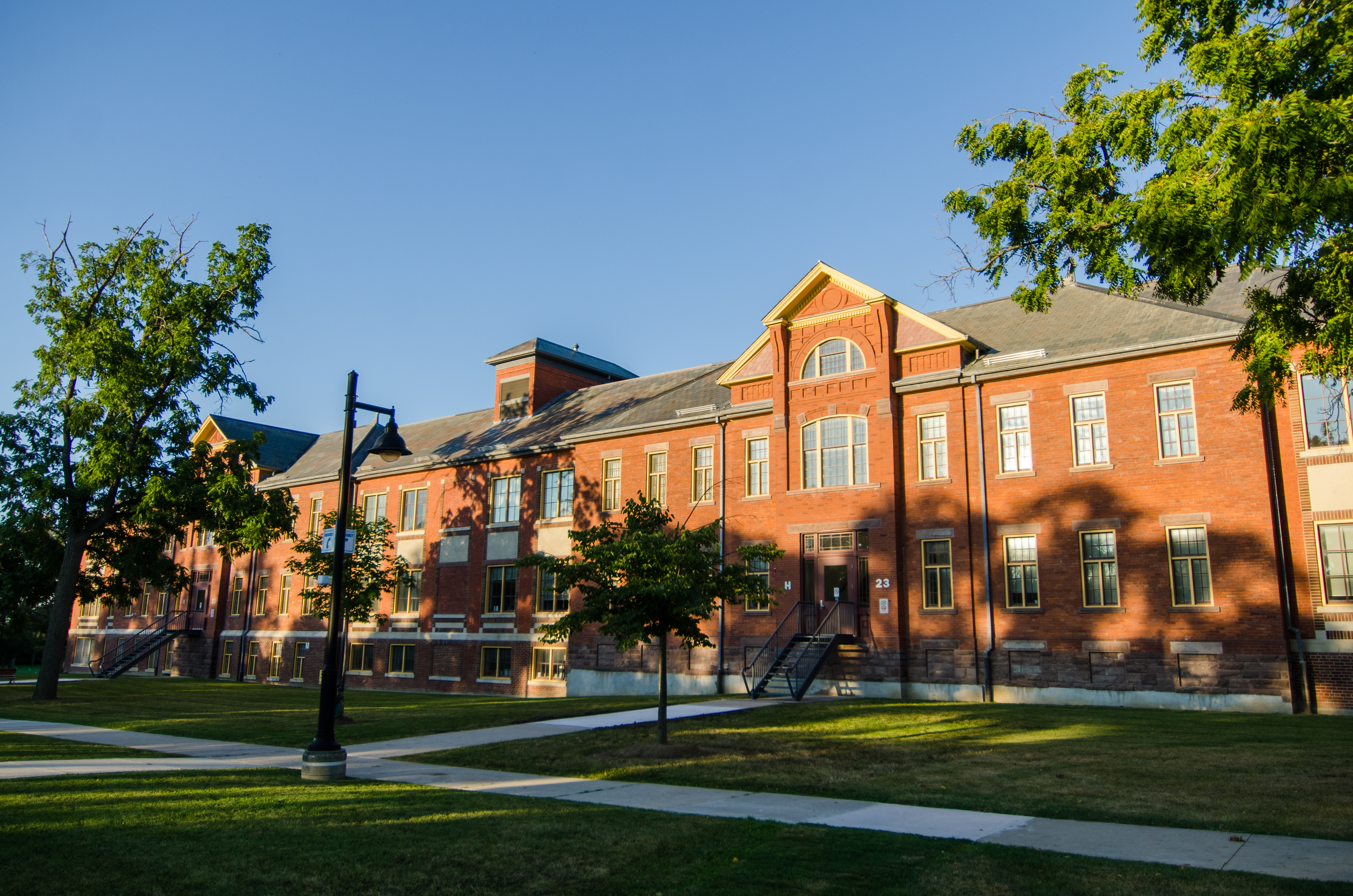
Humber College is a post-secondary institution located in Etobicoke.

The following is a list of educational institutions in Etobicoke, a district of Toronto, Ontario, Canada. Etobicoke is a former municipality within Toronto and served as a suburb of Toronto within Metropolitan Toronto.

Four school boards provide public elementary and secondary education to resident pupils of Etobicoke. The four school boards operate as either English or French first language school boards, and as either secular or separate school boards. In addition to elementary and secondary schools, Etobicoke is also home to two public post-secondary institutions.

== Post-secondary ==
Etobicoke is home to two public post-secondary institutions, Humber College, and the University of Guelph-Humber. Humber College is a public college that operates two campuses in Etobicoke, the Humber North campus, and the Lakeshore campus. University of Guelph-Humber is a post-secondary institutions jointly operated by Humber College, and the University of Guelph. The University of Guelph-Humber does not hold degree granting powers, with Guelph-Humber graduates receiving a degree formally from the University of Guelph.

== Secondary ==
Secondary schools in Etobicoke typically offer schooling for students from Grades 9 to 12. Two public school boards operate secondary schools in Etobicoke, the Toronto Catholic District School Board (TCDSB), and the Toronto District School Board (TDSB). Both school boards are English first language school boards, although TCDSB is a separate school board, whereas TDSB is a secular school board. Toronto's two French first language public school boards, the separate Conseil scolaire catholique MonAvenir, and the secular Conseil scolaire Viamonde (CSV), do not operate a secondary school within Etobicoke. CSV and MonAvenir secondary students attend secondary schools located in the neighbouring districts of North York, or Old Toronto.

In addition to standard secondary schools, the secular English first language school board, the Toronto District School Board (TDSB), also operates adult schools in Etobicoke, such as the Burnhamthorpe Adult Learning Centre at Burnhamthorpe Collegiate Institute.

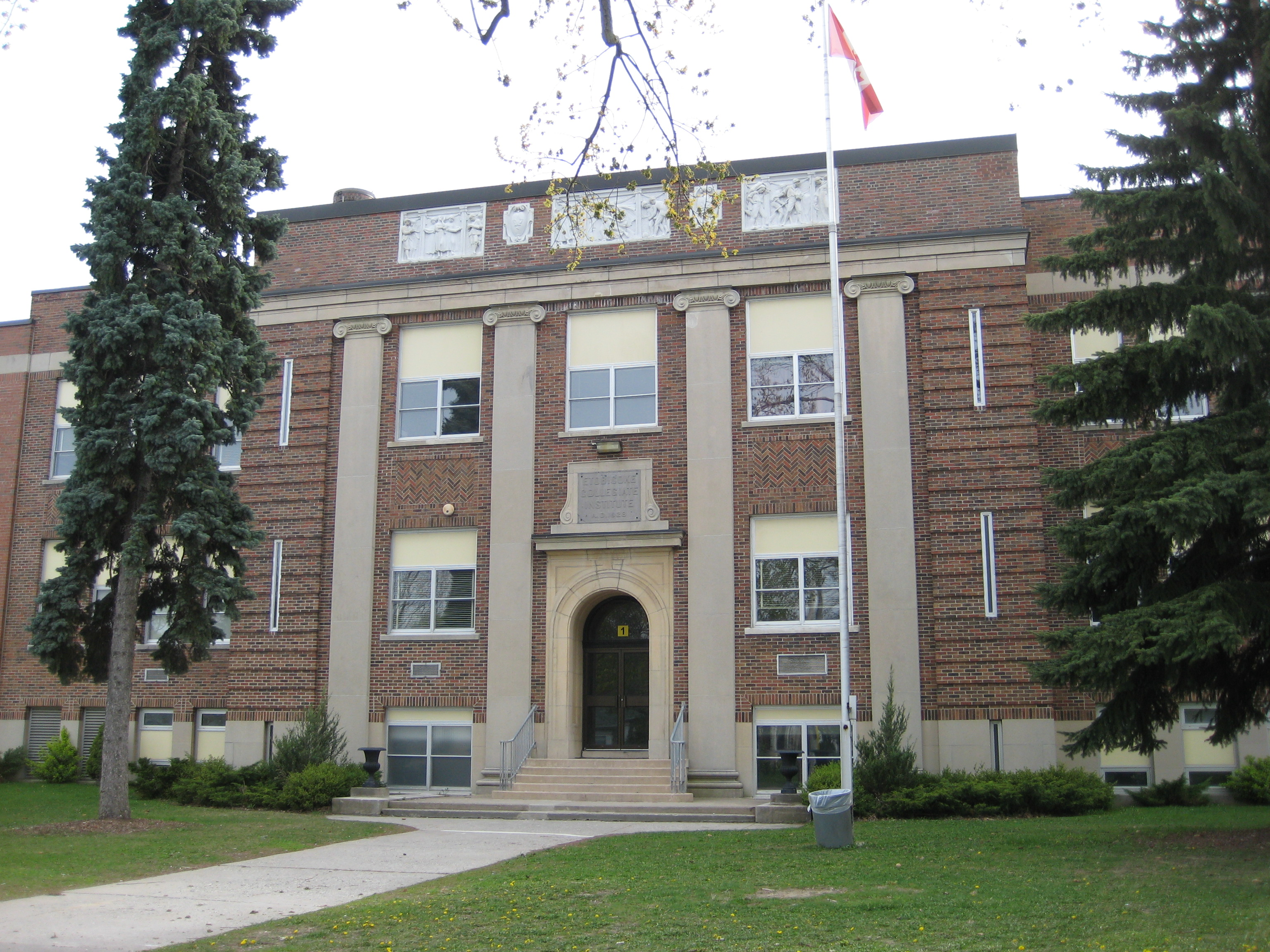
Established in 1928, Etobicoke Collegiate Institute is the oldest public secondary school operating in Etobicoke.

The following is a list of public secondary schools in Etobicoke,

Name	School board	Year established
Bishop Allen Academy	Toronto Catholic District School Board	1989
Burnhamthorpe Collegiate Institute (Note: The following institution operates as an alternative secondary school.)	Toronto District School Board	1956
Central Etobicoke High School	Toronto District School Board	1988
Etobicoke Collegiate Institute	Toronto District School Board	1928
Etobicoke School of the Arts	Toronto District School Board	1981
Etobicoke Year Round Alternative Centre	Toronto District School Board	
Father Henry Carr Catholic Secondary School	Toronto Catholic District School Board	1974
Father John Redmond Catholic Secondary School	Toronto Catholic District School Board	1986 (Note: The school was founded as the southern campus of Michael Power/St. Joseph High School in spring of 1985.)
Kipling Collegiate Institute	Toronto District School Board	1960
Lakeshore Collegiate Institute	Toronto District School Board	1983 (Note: The school was the result of a merger between Alderwood and New Toronto schools in 1983. New Toronto Secondary was established in 1950 and Alderwood Collegiate was established in 1955.)
Martingrove Collegiate Institute	Toronto District School Board	1966
Michael Power/St. Joseph High School	Toronto Catholic District School Board	1982 (Note: The school was the result of a merger between St. Joseph High School and Michael Power High School in 1982. St. Joseph was established in 1949 whereas Michael Power was established in 1957.)
Monsignor Percy Johnson Catholic Secondary School	Toronto Catholic District School Board	1984
North Albion Collegiate Institute	Toronto District School Board	1962
Richview Collegiate Institute	Toronto District School Board	1958
School of Experiential Education	Toronto District School Board	1971
Silverthorn Collegiate Institute	Toronto District School Board	1964
Thistletown Collegiate Institute	Toronto District School Board	1957
West Humber Collegiate Institute	Toronto District School Board	1966

=== Defunct or holding schools ===
Name	School board	Year established	Year closed	Notes
Alderwood Collegiate Institute	Toronto District School Board	1955	1983	Merged with New Toronto to form Lakeshore Collegiate Institute. Building now demolished.
Don Bosco Catholic Secondary School	Toronto Catholic District School Board	1978	2017	
Humbergrove Secondary School (Note: Formerly Humbergrove Vocational School.)	Toronto District School Board	1966	1988	Merged with Westway to form Central Etobicoke High School. Leased to the TCDSB/MSSB and presently operates as Father Henry Carr Catholic Secondary School.
Keiller Mackay Collegiate Institute	Toronto District School Board	1971	1983	
Kingsmill Secondary School (Note: Formerly Kingsmill Vocational School.)	Toronto District School Board	1963	1988	Merged with Westway to form Central Etobicoke High School. Leased to the TCDSB/MSSB and presently operates as Bishop Allen Academy.
Marian Academy Catholic Secondary School	Toronto Catholic District School Board	1988	2002	
Mimico High School	Toronto District School Board	1924	1988	Oldest high school. Building now occupied by John English Junior Middle School.
New Toronto Secondary School	Toronto District School Board	1950	1983	Merged with Alderwood to form Lakeshore Collegiate Institute.
Scarlett Heights Entrepreneurial Academy (Note: Formerly Scarlett Heights Collegiate Institute.)	Toronto District School Board	1963	2018	Merged with Kipling Collegiate Institute.
Vincent Massey Collegiate Institute	Toronto District School Board	1961	1985	Leased to the TCDSB/MSSB and presently operates as Michael Power-St. Joseph High School.
Westway High School (Note: Formerly Westway Vocational School.)	Toronto District School Board	1969	1988	Merged with Humbergrove and Kingsmill to form Central Etobicoke High School.

== Elementary ==
All four Toronto-based public school boards operate institutions in Etobicoke that provide elementary education.

TDSB elementary institutions are categorized as junior schools, middle schools, and junior middle schools. Junior schools typically provide schooling for students from Junior Kindergarten to Grades 5 or 6; whereas middle schools typically provide schooling for students from Grades 6/7 to 8. Junior middle schools are institutions that provides full elementary education from Junior Kindergarten to Grade 8. Elementary institutions in Etobicoke that are operated by TCDSB are named Catholic schools. Elementary schools operated by CSV are named école élémentaire, whereas schools operated by MonAvenir are known as école élémentaire catholique.

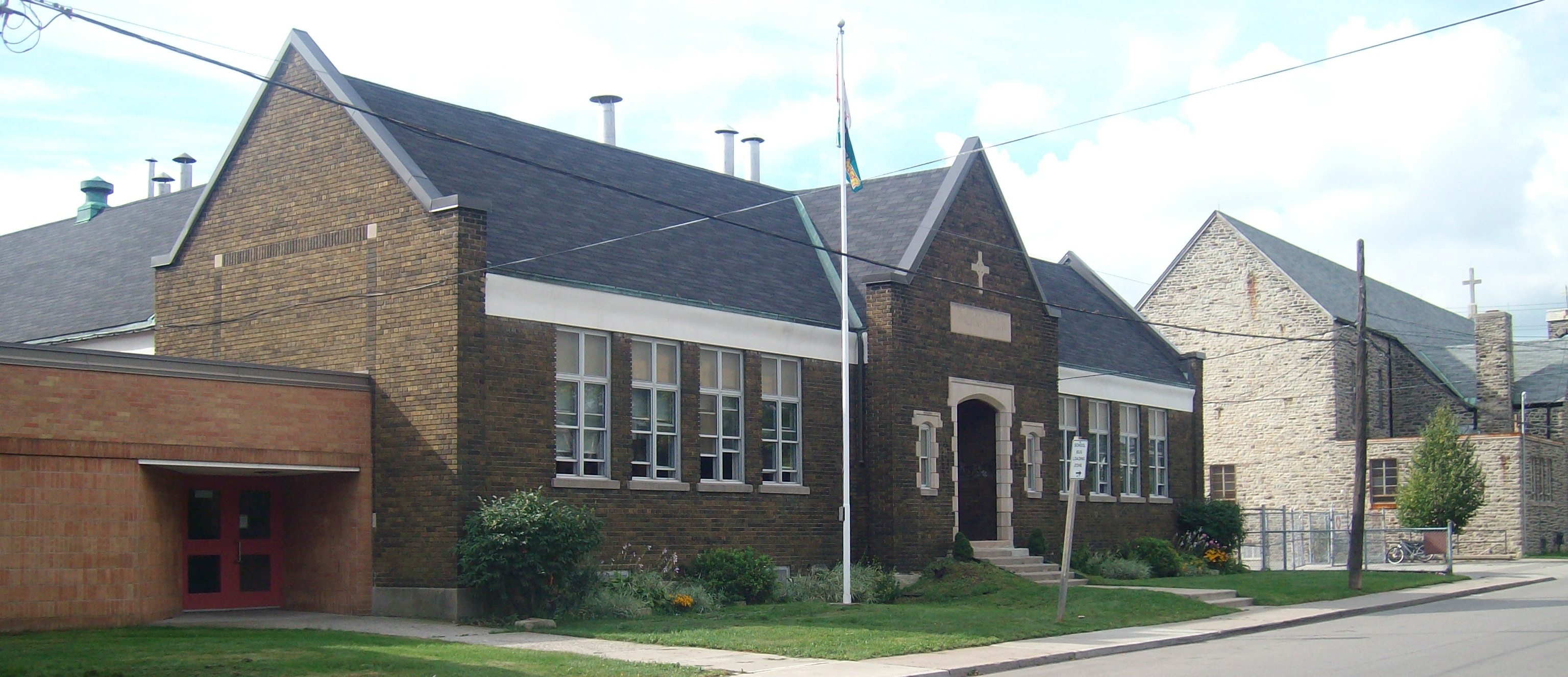
St Leo Catholic School is one of several public separate elementary schools in Etobicoke.

The following is a list of public elementary schools in Etobicoke.

Name	School board
Albion Heights Junior Middle School	Toronto District School Board
All Saints Catholic School	Toronto Catholic District School Board
Beaumonde Heights Junior Middle School	Toronto District School Board
Bloordale Middle School	Toronto District School Board
Bloorlea Middle School	Toronto District School Board
Braeburn Junior School	Toronto District School Board
Briarcrest Junior School	Toronto District School Board
Broadacres Junior School	Toronto District School Board
Clairville Junior School	Toronto District School Board
Dixon Grove Junior Middle School	Toronto District School Board
Eatonville Junior School	Toronto District School Board
Elmbank Junior Middle Academy	Toronto District School Board
Elmlea Junior School	Toronto District School Board
École élémentaire catholique Notre-Dame-de-Grâce	Conseil scolaire catholique MonAvenir
École élémentaire catholique Saint-Noël-Chabanel	Conseil scolaire catholique MonAvenir
École élémentaire catholique Sainte-Marguerite-d'Youville	Conseil scolaire catholique MonAvenir
École élémentaire Félix-Leclerc	Conseil scolaire Viamonde
École élémentaire Micheline-Saint-Cyr	Conseil scolaire Viamonde
Father Serra Catholic School	Toronto Catholic District School Board
George R Gauld Junior School	Toronto District School Board
Greenholme Junior Middle School	Toronto District School Board
Highfield Junior School	Toronto District School Board
Hilltop Middle School	Toronto District School Board
Hollycrest Middle School	Toronto District School Board
Holy Child Catholic School	Toronto Catholic District School Board
Humber Valley Village Junior Middle School	Toronto District School Board
Humberwood Downs Junior Middle Academy	Toronto District School Board
Islington Junior Middle School	Toronto District School Board
James S Bell Junior Middle Sports & Wellness Academy	Toronto District School Board
John G Althouse Middle School	Toronto District School Board
Josyf Cardinal Slipyj Catholic School	Toronto Catholic District School Board
John English Junior Middle School	Toronto District School Board
Mother Cabrini Catholic School	Toronto Catholic District School Board
Karen Kane School of the Arts	Toronto District School Board
Kingsview Village Junior School	Toronto District School Board
Lambton-Kingsway Junior Middle School	Toronto District School Board
Lanor Junior Middle School	Toronto District School Board
Melody Village Junior School	Toronto District School Board
Millwood Junior School	Toronto District School Board
Monsignor John Corrigan Catholic School	Toronto Catholic District School Board
Nativity of Our Lord Catholic School	Toronto Catholic District School Board
Norseman Junior Middle School	Toronto District School Board
North Kipling Junior Middle School	Toronto District School Board
Our Lady of Peace Catholic School	Toronto Catholic District School Board
Park Lawn Junior Middle School	Toronto District School Board
Parkfield Junior School	Toronto District School Board
Princess Margaret Junior School	Toronto District School Board
Rivercrest Junior School	Toronto District School Board
Rosethorn Junior School	Toronto District School Board
Second Street Junior Middle School	Toronto District School Board
Seventh Street Junior School	Toronto District School Board
Sir Adam Beck Junior School	Toronto District School Board
Smithfield Middle School	Toronto District School Board
St Andrew Catholic School	Toronto Catholic District School Board
St Angela Catholic School	Toronto Catholic District School Board
St Benedict Catholic School	Toronto Catholic District School Board
St Clement Catholic School	Toronto Catholic District School Board
St Demetrius Catholic School	Toronto Catholic District School Board
St Dorothy Catholic School	Toronto Catholic District School Board
St Eugene Catholic School	Toronto Catholic District School Board
St George's Junior School	Toronto District School Board
St Gregory Catholic School	Toronto Catholic District School Board
St John Vianney Catholic School	Toronto Catholic District School Board
St. Leo Catholic School	Toronto Catholic District School Board
St Marcellus Catholic School	Toronto Catholic District School Board
St Maurice Catholic School	Toronto Catholic District School Board
St Stephen Catholic School	Toronto Catholic District School Board
Sunnylea Junior School	Toronto District School Board
The Elms Junir Middle School/Boys Leadership Academy	Toronto District School Board
Transfiguration of our Lord Catholic School	Toronto Catholic District School Board
Twentieth Street Junior School	Toronto District School Board
Valleyfield Junior School	Toronto District School Board
Wedgewood Junior School	Toronto District School Board
Wellesworth Junior School	Toronto District School Board
West Humber Junior Middle School	Toronto District School Board
West Glen Junior School	Toronto District School Board
Westmount Junior School	Toronto District School Board
Westway Junior School	Toronto District School Board

== See also ==
- Education in Toronto
- List of educational institutions in Scarborough
- List of schools of the Conseil scolaire Viamonde
- List of schools of the Conseil scolaire catholique MonAvenir
- List of schools in the Toronto Catholic District School Board
- List of schools in the Toronto District School Board
