= List of Gamma Sigma chapters =

Gamma Sigma was the first international secondary school fraternity. It was originally founded as a literary society in 1869 at the Brockport Normal School in Brockport, New York, and chartered at least 119 chapters at normal schools and high schools in the United States and Canada. The organization no longer has active chapters at the secondary school level, with the last active chapter ending around 1994. However, it has an active alumni based in the Niagara Region, Ontario, Canada.

== Alumni clubs ==
Following are the Gamma Sigma alumni clubs in order of formation, with active clubs indicated in bold and inactive chapters in italics.

Club	Charter date and range	Location	Status	Ref.
Beta Alumni Club	1912–before 1969	Rochester, New York	Inactive	(Note: This club was formed when the fraternity was banned from Rochester's schools.)
Azak Alumni Club	19xx ?–before 1969	Niagara Falls, Ontario, Canada	Inactive	
Baltimore Alumni Club	19xx ?–before 1969	Baltimore, Maryland	Inactive	
Beta Zeta Alumni Club	19xx ?–before 1969	Toronto, Ontario, Canada	Inactive	
Gamma Delta Nu Alumni Club	19xx ?–before 1969	Willowdale, Toronto, Ontario, Canada	Inactive	
Gamma Sigma Toronto Alumni Club	19xx ?–xxxx ?	Toronto, Ontario, Canada	Inactive	
Beta Pi Alumni Club	19xx ?–before 1969	New Toronto, Ontario, Canada	Inactive	
Gamma Beta Alumni Club	19xx ?–before 1969	Cooksville, Ontario, Canada	Inactive	
Gamma Tau Alumni Club	19xx ?–before 1969	Toronto, Ontario, Canada	Inactive	
Gamma Sigma York Alumni Club	19xx ?–xxxx ?	Toronto, Ontario, Canada	Inactive	
Gamma Pi Alumni Club	19xx ?–xxxx ?	Etobicoke, Ontario, Canada	Inactive	

== Secondary school chapters ==
Chapters were named according to the Greek alphabet; however, the letters Omega and Gamma Sigma were never assigned. Following is a list of chapters through 1969, with inactive chapters and institutions in italics.

Chapter	Charter date and range	Institution	Location	Status	Ref.
Alpha	October 11, 1869 – 1932	Brockport State Normal School	Brockport, New York	Inactive	
Beta (First)	September 30, 1890 – March 10, 1914	Rochester Free Academy	Rochester, New York	Inactive, Reassigned	(Note: This chapter was formed in early 1890 without the consent of the society. It was never officially chartered but was, instead permission to operate. It closed when the school system banned fraternities.)
Gamma (First)	December 5, 1890 – February 28, 1894	Buffalo Normal School	Buffalo, New York	Inactive, Reassigned	
Delta	December 21, 1892 – c. 1918	Cortland Normal School	Cortland, New York	Inactive	(Note: Chapter formed from the Normal Debating Club (local), established in 1870.) (Note: Chapter closed during World War I and did not reorganize after the war.)
Epsilon	1892–c. 1918	Ithaca High School	Ithaca, New York	Inactive	(Note: This was the first chapter chartered at a high school, rather than a normal school.)
Zeta	December 20, 1893 – c. 1918	Geneseo Normal and Training School	Geneseo, New York	Inactive	(Note: Chapter formed from the Zetamathean Society (local), established in 1892.)
Eta	November 24, 1894	Evanston Township High School	Evanston, Illinois	Inactive	(Note: Chapter formed from the S. F. Club (local), established in the summer of 1894.)
Gamma (Second)	April 2, 1894	Central High School	Buffalo, New York	Inactive	
Gamma (Second)	April 2, 1894	Lafayette High School	Buffalo, New York	Inactive	
Gamma (Second)	April 2, 1894	Masten Park High School	Buffalo, New York	Inactive	
Theta	May 19, 1896 – c. 1918	Hyde Park High School	Chicago, Illinois	Inactive	(Note: Chapter was chartered at Hyde Park High School, but appears to added Englewood High School at a later date.)
Theta	May 19, 1896 – c. 1918	Englewood High School	Chicago, Illinois	Inactive	(Note: Chapter was chartered at Hyde Park High School, but appears to added Englewood High School at a later date.)
Iota	March 11, 1898 – c. 1918	Lockport High School	Lockport, New York	Inactive	
Kappa	May 16, 1899	Malden High School	Malden, Massachusetts	Inactive	
Lambda	June 2, 1899 – c. 1918	Oak Park High School	Oak Park, Illinois	Inactive	
Mu	March 11, 1900 – 1903	Central High School	Cleveland, Ohio	Inactive	(Note: The chapter's charter was withdrawn due to a lack of supervision.)
Mu	March 11, 1900 – 1903	University School of Cleveland	Cleveland, Ohio	Inactive	(Note: The chapter's charter was withdrawn due to a lack of supervision.)
Nu	June 1, 1901 – c. 1918	Geneva High School	Geneva, New York	Inactive	
Xi	April 4, 1903 – c. 1918	Newton High School	Newton, Massachusetts	Inactive	
Omicron	May 5, 1903	Syracuse High School	Syracuse, New York	Inactive	
Pi	May 19, 1904 – c. 1918	University High School	Chicago, Illinois	Inactive	
Rho	March 30, 1904 – c. 1918	Niagara Falls High School	Niagara Falls, New York	Inactive	
Sigma	April 29, 1905 – c. 1918	Hornell High School	Hornell, New York	Inactive	(Note: Chapter formed at the Hornellsville High School from the Young Men's Club of Hornellsville High School, established in October 1904. The town's name was changed to Hornell c. 1904.)
Tau	February 2, 1906 – 1960	Classical High School	Worcester, Massachusetts	Inactive	(Note: Chapter formed from Upsilon Sigma Pi, a local secret society established in November 1904. Only active members were accepted, not the alumni.)
Tau	February 2, 1906 – 1960	English High School	Worcester, Massachusetts	Inactive	(Note: Chapter formed from Upsilon Sigma Pi, a local secret society established in November 1904. Only active members were accepted, not the alumni.)
Tau	February 2, 1906 – 1960	South High Community School	Worcester, Massachusetts	Inactive	(Note: Chapter formed from Upsilon Sigma Pi, a local secret society established in November 1904. Only active members were accepted, not the alumni.)
Upsilon	September 15, 1906 – c. 1918	Omaha High School	Omaha, Nebraska	Inactive	(Note: Chapter formed from Kappa Sigma Tau Fraternity (local), established March 2, 1905. It included several high schools in the area.)
Phi	June 1, 1907 – c. 1918	Classical High School	Providence, Rhode Island	Inactive	(Note: Chapter formed from Delta Kappa (local), established in 1900.)
Phi	June 1, 1907 – c. 1918	Hope Street High School	Providence, Rhode Island	Inactive	(Note: Chapter formed from Delta Kappa (local), established in 1900.)
Phi	June 1, 1907 – c. 1918	Providence Career and Technical Academy	Providence, Rhode Island	Inactive	(Note: Chapter formed from Delta Kappa (local), established in 1900.)
Chi	September 28, 1907 – c. 1918	Central High School	Detroit, Michigan	Inactive	(Note: Chapter formed from the Gamma Sigma Society, a former pledging club for Gamma Delta Psi.)
Chi	September 28, 1907 – c. 1918	University Schools of Detroit	Detroit, Michigan	Inactive	(Note: Chapter formed from the Gamma Sigma Society, a former pledging club for Gamma Delta Psi.)
Psi	1913	East High School	Columbus, Ohio	Inactive	(Note: Chapter formed from Phi Delta Upsilon (local).)
Psi	1913	North High School	Columbus, Ohio	Inactive	(Note: Chapter formed from Phi Delta Upsilon (local).)
Omega				Unassigned	
Alpha Alpha	1915	Barringer High School	Newark, New Jersey	Inactive	
Alpha Alpha	1915	Central High School	Newark, New Jersey	Inactive	
Alpha Alpha	1915	South Side High School	Newark, New Jersey	Inactive	
Alpha Beta	1916		Washington, D.C.	Inactive	(Note: Chapter included various high schools in the city.)
Alpha Gamma	June 11, 1923	Amsterdam High School	Amsterdam, New York	Inactive	
Alpha Delta (First)	March 3, 1926 – c. 1942	Kenmore High School	Kenmore, New York	Inactive, Reassigned	(Note: Chapter went inactive during World War II.)
Alpha Epsilon	January 10, 1927	Quincy High School	Quincy, Massachusetts	Inactive	
Alpha Zeta	December 11, 1927	Niagara Falls Collegiate Institute	Niagara Falls, Ontario, Canada	Inactive	(Note: Chapter formed from Nu Di Gamma Fraternity (local).)
Alpha Eta	February 4, 1927	Bowen High School	Chicago, Illinois	Inactive	
Beta (Second)	October 26, 1928 – c. 1942; October 13, 1950	John Marshall High School	Rochester, New York	Inactive	(Note: Chapter formed from Alpha Gamma Sigma, established in April 1927.)
Alpha Theta	September 29, 1929		Lima, Ohio	Inactive	
Alpha Iota	1929		Chicago, Illinois	Inactive	
Alpha Kappa	April 21, 1930	Stamford Collegiate	Stamford, Ontario, Canada	Inactive	
Alpha Lambda	September 29, 1930	Bennett High School	Buffalo, New York	Inactive	
Alpha Mu	October 15, 1930		Chicago, Illinois	Inactive	
Alpha Nu	August 14, 1930	Hamilton Central Collegiate Institute	Hamilton, Ontario, Canada	Inactive	(Note: Chapter formed from Sigam Phi Sigma Fraternity (local), Y.H. Club (local), and O.S. Club (local).)
Alpha Xi	December 10, 1930		Birmingham, Alabama	Inactive	(Note: Chapter formed from Alpha Theta Pi (local). It included students from various Birmingham high schools.)
Alpha Omicron	January 26, 1931 – September 1959	Washington-Lee High School	Cherrydale, Virginia	Inactive	(Note: Chapter closed due to anti-fraternity agitation.)
Alpha Pi	January 21, 1931		Baltimore, Maryland	Inactive	
Alpha Rho	December 5, 1931	Parker High School	Chicago, Illinois	Inactive	
Alpha Sigma	December 1931–late 1930s; May 30, 1940 – c. 1942; August 26, 1953	St. Catharines Collegiate	St. Catharines, Ontario, Canada	Inactive	
Alpha Tau	1932–193x ?		Detroit, Michigan	Inactive	
Alpha Upsilon	1932		Washington, D.C.	Inactive	
Alpha Phi	October 19, 1932	Riverside High School	Buffalo, New York	Inactive	
Alpha Chi	1932–1940; January 10, 1953		Baltimore, Maryland	Inactive	
Alpha PsiFirstst)	November 3, 1932 – 19xx ?	Wilmington High School	Wilmington, Delaware	Inactive	
Alpha Omega (First)	December 1932–c. 1942	Amherst Central High School	Snyder, New York	Inactive, Reassigned	
Beta Alpha	1935 ?–1938	Santa Ana Junior College	Santa Ana, California	Inactive	
Beta Beta	June 18, 1935	Alexis I. duPont High School	Wilmington, Delaware	Inactive	
Beta Gamma	January 3, 1936		Fort Erie, Ontario, Canada	Inactive	
Beta Delta	April 6, 1936		St. Petersburg, Florida	Inactive	(Note: Chapter formed from the Ty-Zon Club (local) and Tau Eta Tau (local).)
Beta Epsilon	January 30, 1937	East Aurora High School	East Aurora, New York	Inactive	(Note: Chapter formed from Sigma Xi Kappa (local), established on April 27, 1932.)
Beta Zeta (First)	1939–March 1940	Runnymede Collegiate Institute	Toronto, Ontario, Canada	Inactive	
Beta Eta	December 10, 1939 – c. 1942	Hutchinson Central Technical High School	Buffalo, New York	Inactive	
Beta Theta	April 29, 1940	Forest Park High School	Baltimore, Maryland	Inactive	
Beta Iota	June 18, 1942 – 194x ?; March 3, 1956	Baltimore Polytechnic Institute	Baltimore, Maryland	Inactive	
Beta Kappa	January 8, 1944	Baltimore City College	Baltimore, Maryland	Inactive	
Beta Lambda	February 1946–195x ?; January 8, 1961 – 1964	Towson High School	Baltimore, Maryland	Inactive	(Note: After going dormant, the chapter was reformed in 1961 by absorbing Beta Gamma Delta (local), established on September 25, 1960. The chapter's charter was revoked in 1960.)
Beta Mu	May 21, 1951	Baldwinsville Academy and Central School	Baldwinsville, New York	Inactive	
Beta Nu	May 2, 1952	Mimico High School	Mimico, Ontario, Canada	Inactive	
Alpha Omega (Second)	195x ?–1960		Eggertsville, New York	Inactive	(Note: Chapter was expelled because of outstanding back taxes.)
Beta Zeta (Second)	December 28, 1952 – 1953	Ryerson Institute of Technology	Toronto, Ontario, Canada	Inactive	(Note: This was the first collegiate chapter.)
Beta Zeta (Second)	December 28, 1952 – 1953	University of Toronto	Toronto, Ontario, Canada	Inactive	(Note: This was the first collegiate chapter.)
Beta Zeta (Third)	December 28, 1952	Oakwood Collegiate Institute	Toronto, Ontario, Canada	Inactive	(Note: Charter was issued to Oakwood Collegiate and Vaughn Road Collegiate. However, it was transferred to only Vaugh Road on April 23, 1954.)
Beta Zeta (Third)	December 28, 1952	Vaughan Road Collegiate Institute	Toronto, Ontario, Canada	Inactive	(Note: Charter was issued to Oakwood Collegiate and Vaughn Road Collegiate. However, it was transferred to only Vaugh Road on April 23, 1954.)
Alpha Delta (Second)	February 27, 1954	Grover Cleveland High School	Buffalo, New York	Inactive	
Beta Xi	March 7, 1954	Catonsville High School	Baltimore, Maryland	Inactive	
Beta Xi	March 7, 1954	City High School	Baltimore, Maryland	Inactive	
Beta Xi	March 7, 1954	Baltimore Polytechnic Institute	Baltimore, Maryland	Inactive	
Beta Omicron	April 23, 1954	Etobicoke Collegiate Institute	Etobicoke, Ontario, Canada	Inactive	
Beta Pi	April 23, 1954	New Toronto Secondary School	New Toronto, Ontario, Canada	Inactive	(Note: The school closed in 1983.)
Beta Rho (First)	January 30, 1955 – 1956	Notre Dame College School	Welland, Ontario, Canada	Inactive	(Note: The chapter's charter was withdrawn due to misconduct.)
Beta Rho (Second)	May 3, 1958		Buffalo, New York	Inactive	
Beta Sigma	August 24, 1956 – 1959		Mobile, Alabama	Inactive	(Note: Chapter closed due to its inability to recruit new members.)
Beta Tau	November 7, 1956	Niagara District Secondary School	Niagara-on-the-Lake, Ontario, Canada	Inactive	(Note: The school closed in 2010.)
Alpha Psi (Second)	November 7, 1956	A. N. Myer Secondary School	Niagara Falls, Ontario, Canada	Inactive	(Note: Chapter formed from the Hi-Y Club (local), which became Alpha Psi (local) on November 19, 1955. It then chartered with Gamma Sigma in 1966.)
Beta Upsilon	December 29, 1956	Royal York Collegiate Institute	Etobicoke, Ontario, Canada	Inactive	(Note: The school closed in 1982.)
Beta Phi	December 29, 1956	Alderwood Collegiate Institute	Alderwood, Toronto, Ontario, Canada	Inactive	
Beta Chi	January 19, 1957	Lewiston-Porter High School	Lewiston, New York	Inactive	
Beta Psi	March 9, 1957	Catonsville High School	Catonsville, Maryland	Inactive	(Note: Chapter formed from Phi Nu Omega (local).)
Beta Omega	March 9, 1957	McDonogh School	Baltimore, Maryland	Inactive	(Note: Chapter formed from Kappa Beta Phi (local).)
Gamma Alpha	March 30, 1957	Burnhamthorpe Collegiate Institute	Etobicoke, Ontario, Canada	Inactive	
Gamma Beta	April 7, 1957	Thomas L. Kennedy Secondary School	Cooksville, Ontario, Canada	Inactive	
Gamma Gamma	April 1957–1958; March 1969	La Salle High School	La Salle, New York	Inactive	(Note: The chapter's charter was revoked for low recruitment. However, it continued to operate as a local organization until March 1969, when it applied for re-recognition.)
Gamma Delta	May 26, 1957	Earl Haig Collegiate Institute	Willowdale, Toronto, Ontario, Canada	Inactive	
Gamma Epsilon	November 22, 1958	Richview Collegiate Institute	Etobicoke, Ontario, Canada	Inactive	
Gamma Zeta	November 22, 1958 – 1967; November 17, 1968		Toronto, Ontario, Canada	Inactive	(Note: Chapter was expelled for poor pledging practices.)
Gamma Eta	November 1958		Niagara Falls, New York	Inactive	
Gamma Theta	July 18, 1959		Parkville, Maryland	Inactive	
Gamma Iota	December 5, 1959	Weston Collegiate Institute	Weston, Toronto, Ontario, Canada	Inactive	
Gamma Kappa	December 5, 1959	Burlington Central High School	Burlington, Ontario, Canada	Inactive	
Gamma Lambda	December 5, 1959	West Hill Collegiate Institute	West Hill, Toronto, Ontario, Canada	Inactive	
Gamma Mu	February 29, 1960 – 19xx ?	Pelham High School	Fonthill, Ontario, Canada	Inactive	(Note: School closed in 1974.)
Gamma Nu	March 27, 1960	Northview Heights Collegiate Institute	Willowdale, Toronto, Ontario, Canada	Inactive	
Gamma Xi	June 17, 1960 – September 1960		Pembroke, Ontario, Canada	Inactive	
Gamma Omicron	November 26, 1961	Thistletown Collegiate Institute	Rexdale, Ontario, Canada	Inactive	
Gamma Pi	October 28, 1962	Kipling Collegiate Institute	Etobicoke, Ontario, Canada	Inactive	
Gamma Rho	January 20, 1963	Eastdale Secondary School	Welland, Ontario, Canada	Inactive	
Gamma Sigma				Unassigned	
Gamma Tau	April 7, 1963	George Harvey Collegiate Institute	Toronto, Ontario, Canada	Inactive	
Gamma Upsilon	April 7, 1963	North Albion Collegiate Institute	Rexdale, Ontario, Canada	Inactive	
Gamma Phi	September 23, 1963	Westlane Secondary School	Niagara Falls, Ontario, Canada	Inactive	
Gamma Chi	February 15, 1964	Sir Winston Churchill Secondary School	St. Catherines, Ontario, Canada	Inactive	
Gamma Psi	February 29, 1964	Gordon Graydon Memorial Secondary School	Port Credit, Peel, Ontario, Canada	Inactive	
Gamma Omega	March 1, 1964	W. A. Porter Collegiate Institute	Scarborough, Ontario, Canada	Inactive	
Delta Alpha	1964	Richmond Hill High School	Richmond Hill, Ontario, Canada	Inactive	
Delta Beta	November 8, 1964 – 196x ?; 1968		Clarkson, Ontario. Canada	Inactive	
Delta Gamma	December 6, 1964	Woburn Collegiate Institute	Scarborough, Ontario, Canada	Inactive	
Delta Delta	January 1965	Victoria Park Collegiate Institute	Richmond Hill, Ontario, Canada	Inactive	
Delta Epsilon	January 17, 1965		Fort Erie, Ontario, Canada	Inactive	
Delta Zeta	January 17, 1965		Niagara Falls, Ontario, Canada	Inactive	
Delta Eta	April 25, 1965	Scarlett Heights Collegiate Institute	Etobicoke, Ontario, Canada	Inactive	
Delta Theta	May 1965	Aldershot School	Burlington, Ontario, Canada	Inactive	
Delta Iota	June 27, 1965	C. W. Jefferys Collegiate Institute	Downsview, Toronto. Ontario, Canada	Inactive	
Delta Kappa	October 11, 1965	Burnhamthorpe Collegiate Institute	Etobicoke, Ontario, Canada	Inactive	(Note: Chapter formed from the Kappa Pi chapter of Omega Sigma Psi (local), established on October 11, 1963.)
Delta Lambda	April 10, 1966	Emery Collegiate Institute	Weston, Toronto, Ontario, Canada	Inactive	
Delta Mu	April 16, 1967	West Humber Collegiate Institute	Etobicoke, Ontario, Canada	Inactive	
Delta Nu	April 16, 1967	Port Credit Secondary School	Port Credit, Ontario, Canada	Inactive	
Delta Xi	April 16, 1967	Sir Wilfrid Laurier Collegiate Institute	Scarborough, Ontario, Canada	Inactive	(Note: Chapter formed from the Lambda Gamma Club, established in September 1966.)
Delta Omicron	April 30, 1967	Waterdown District High School	Waterdown, Ontario, Canada	Inactive	
Delta Pi	May 12, 1967	Vincent Massey Collegiate Institute	Etobicoke, Ontario, Canada	Inactive	
Delta Rho	October 11, 1967	Streetsville Secondary School	Streetsville, Ontario, Canada	Inactive	
Delta Sigma	January 14, 1968	Oakville Trafalgar High School	Oakville, Ontario, Canada	Inactive	
Delta Tau	January 14, 1968	Thomas A. Blakelock High School	Oakville, Ontario, Canada	Inactive	
Delta Upsilon	April 7, 1968	Denis Morris Collegiate	Thorold, Ontario, Canada	Inactive	
Delta Phi	April 7, 1968	Glendale Secondary School	Hamilton, Ontario, Canada	Inactive	
Delta Chi	April 7, 1968	Westdale Secondary School	Hamilton, Ontario, Canada	Inactive	
Delta Psi	November 17, 1968	Applewood Heights Secondary School	Mississauga, Ontario, Canada	Inactive	
