= North Albion Collegiate Institute =

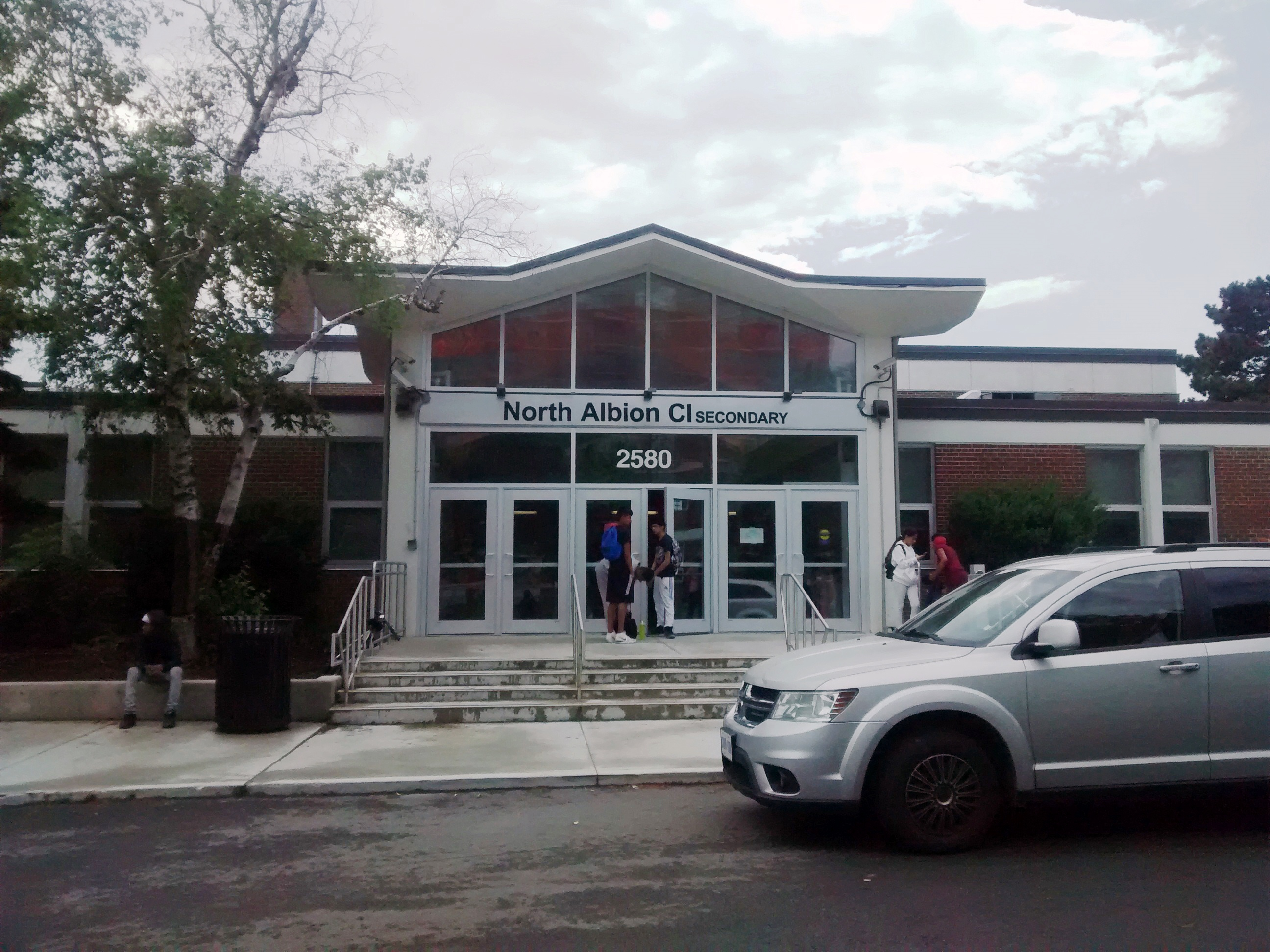

Location
- 2580 Kipling Avenue; Toronto, Ontario, M9V 3B2; Canada; 43.747170°N 79.585117°W

Information
- School type: Public, high school
- Motto: Virtus, Officium, Veritas (Excellence, Service, Truth)
- Founded: 1962
- School board: Toronto District School Board (Etobicoke Board of Education)
- Superintendent: Ali Jahangir; LN01
- Area trustee: Dennis Hastings; Ward 1
- School number: 2807 / 929468
- Principal: Carolyn Vranesic
- Grades: 9-12
- Enrolment: 827 (June 30, 2022)
- Language: English
- Schedule type: Semestered
- Campus size: 11.5 acres
- Colours: Orange and blue
- Mascot: Cougar
- Team name: North Albion Cougars
- Website: schoolweb.tdsb.on.ca/naci/
- Last updated: April 17, 2025

North Albion Collegiate Institute (abbreviated as North Albion CI, NACI or North Albion) is a high school in the Etobicoke area of the city of Toronto, Ontario, Canada. It is part of the Toronto District School Board. Prior to 1998, it was part of the Etobicoke Board of Education. Its motto is Virtus, Officium, Vertias ("Excellence, Service, Truth").

== History ==
The school was constructed in 1961 and opened on September 4, 1962 to serve the growing suburb of Rexdale as Etobicoke's eleventh high school and its tenth collegiate. The North Albion school was designed by architects Craig, Madill, Abram and Ingleson.

Clubs include student council, year book club, Deca, Model UN, and chess club.

The school's most notable sports teams are cricket, volleyball and basketball teams.

The enrolment of the school is 827 students, as of 2024. The building can hold up to 1,095 students.

On 23 September 2014, student Hamid Aminzada, age 19, was stabbed in the school hallway while he was trying to defuse a fight among two fellow students. He later died in hospital due to his injuries.

== Overview ==
North Albion earned a reputation for academic and athletic excellence from the time of its inception through the 1980s. In recent years, discipline has improved and, as a result, the post-secondary success rate has been rising dramatically. From 2000 to 2004, the graduation rate rose to 40%. It is placed above other local schools such as West Humber Collegiate Institute, Thistletown Collegiate Institute, and Martingrove Collegiate Institute, as a school known for excellence in academics.

Community involvement is shown by the institute's contributions through Student Government, Parent Council, Leadership Club, Breakfast Club, the United Way Committee, the Duke of Edinburgh Club, World Vision Volunteers, Crime Stoppers, and participation in community beautification days.

An integral part of NACI is the multi-grade, whole school Teacher Advisor Program.

Its feeder schools include North Kipling Junior Middle School and Smithfield Middle School, as well as nearby St. Andrew and St. Angela Separate Schools.

North Albion became the first school in North America to offer steel band as a full credit course in high school.

=== Building ===
North Albion Collegiate Institute is a 171,804 sq ft (15,961.1 m^{2}) two-storey secondary school in 12.16 acres (4.92 ha) of land, features 29 academic classrooms, six science labs, seven computer labs, two music rooms, a visual arts room, a drama room, three vocational shops for automotive and construction, a 750-seat auditorium, cafeteria with servery, three gymnasiumsd, and a library. There is a child care centre in the northwestern corner of the school.

The building has a composite layout, like most high schools in Etobicoke built in the 1950s and 1960s.

== Crest ==
During the 1962-63 inaugural academic year, the Hon. J. Keiller MacKay opened the school officially and gave North Albion its motto: Virtus, Officium, Veritas – Excellence, Service, Truth. The Olympian torch and the book below the motto on the crest signify the struggle for the light of knowledge. The trees are for growth. The mountain ash was chosen for its white flowers and orange berries. The triangle in the centre is a blue spruce, completing the school colours of orange, blue and white.

The G.M. Hull Award commemorates North Albion C.I.'s former Principal Hull. It is NACI's most prestigious award and is given to a student in the graduating class who best represents his or her grade.

== Notable alumni ==
- Teri Austin, actress
- Daniel Dearing, Canadian Beach volleyball Olympian
- Andrés Fresenga, current soccer player with the Ottawa Fury FC
- Johnny Legend, stand-up comedian, radio show host and actor
- Dean McDermott, actor and husband of Tori Spelling
- Bruce McDonald, film director, The Tracey Fragments, Highway 61, Roadkill, Hard Core Logo
- Craig Ramsay, former NHL player and coach
- John L. Wallace, medical researcher; co-founder of NicOx and founder of Antibe Therapeutics; fellow of the Royal Society of Canada

== See also ==
- Education in Ontario
- List of secondary schools in Ontario
