= Kingsmill Secondary School =

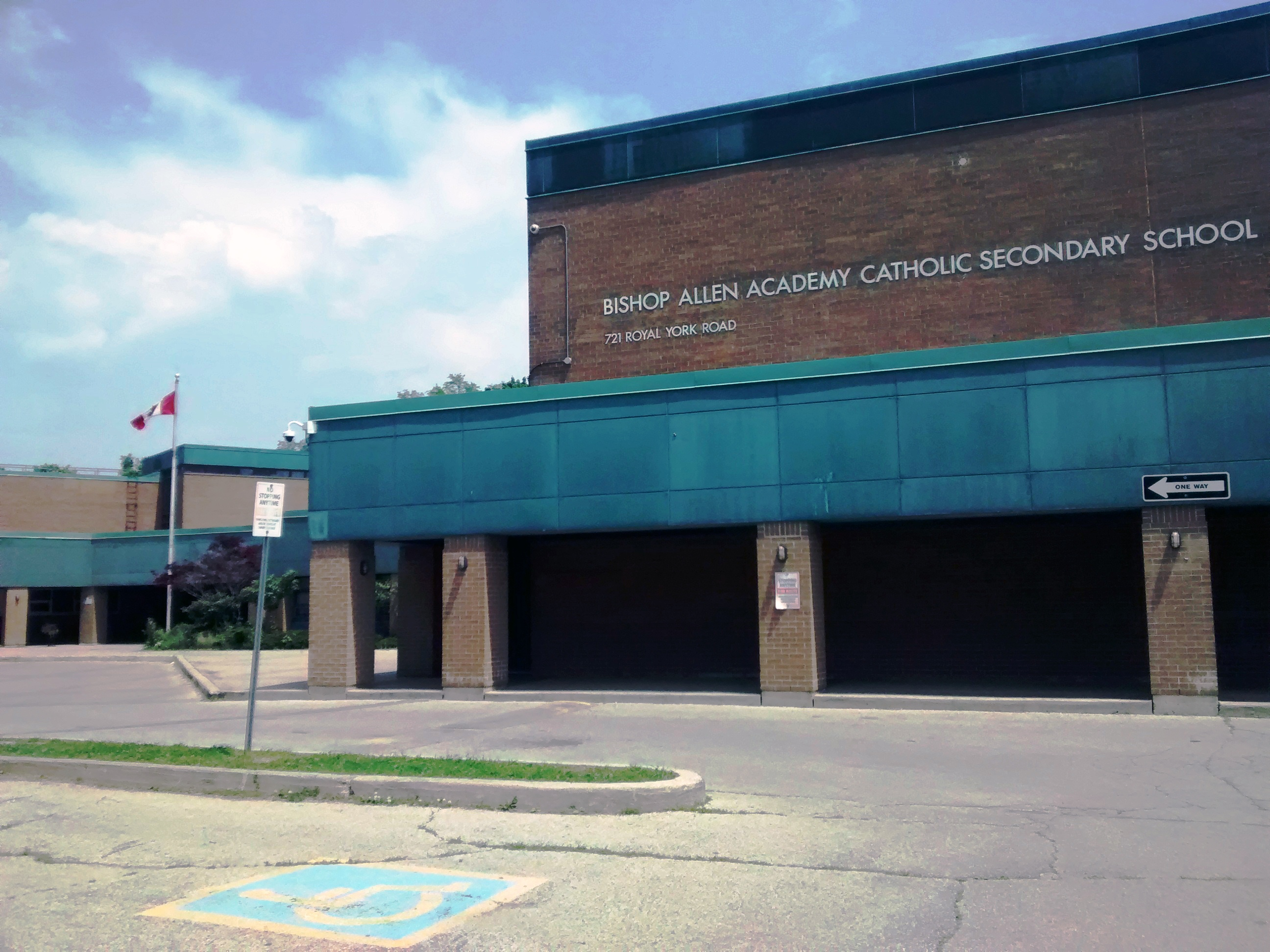

Location
- 721 Royal York Road; Etobicoke, Toronto, Ontario, M8Y 2T3; Canada; 43.6344°N 79.5045°W

Information
- Former name: Kingsmill Vocational School
- School type: Vocational High School; Public High School
- Motto: Industry. Integrity.
- Religious affiliation: Secular
- Founded: 1963
- Status: Leased out
- Closed: 1988
- School board: Toronto District School Board (Etobicoke Board of Education)
- Oversight: Toronto Lands Corporation
- Superintendent: Beth Butcher; LC1, Executive Superintendent; Tracy Hayhurst; LN20
- Area trustee: Patrick Nunziata; Ward 3
- School number: 919845
- Grades: 9-13
- Enrollment: 717
- Language: English
- Colours: Maroon and Gold
- Team name: Kingsmill Tigers
- Public transit access: TTC: North/South: 76 Royal York South; West/East: 15 Evans, 38 Horner; Rapid Transit: Royal York
- Website: Kingsmill Secondary School on Facebook

Kingsmill Secondary School (also called Kingsmill (Vocational) Collegiate Institute, KCI, KSS, or simply Kingsmill), originally known as Kingsmill Vocational School is a Toronto District School Board building that existed as a public and vocational high school existed from 1963 until its closure in June 1988 run by the Etobicoke Board of Education. The school property as of 2026, remains under TDSB possession. This school was the first vocational school built in Etobicoke. Its motto was "Industry. Integrity."

== History ==
Originally a piece of land surveyed in the township of Etobicoke in 1793 by local developer Frederick Davidson which was set aside for the use of the government mill or the King's Mill located at the first rapids upstream from Lake Ontario and was later used for his 'Brookwood' estate. The house was eventually demolished in 1961 and the Etobicoke Board of Education built and opened Kingsmill (named after the Old 'King's' Mill) on September 3, 1963, at cost of $982,210.00. Designed by architect Gordon Adamson, the school building featured 8 classrooms 1 art room, 11 multiple shops (wood working, machine, sheet metal, general, horticulture, art, grooming-barbering-hairdressing, sewing and infant care, home economics, 2 boys' occupations) tailored for students with slow learning disabilities, a cafetorium, double gymnasium, and library.

In 1972, Kingsmill hosted Humber College's women's basketball team due to lack of home games at their campus.

From 1976 until 1979, Kingsmill's students were accommodated at nearby Crestwood Junior School, which was then closed in 1976 (the school has since been reopened as Karen Kain Arts School).

An accommodation review occurred in 1987 when EBE originally decided to close Kingsmill and Humbergrove Secondary School in April 1987 since enrolment went down at the 207 mark in 1987 and 191 in 1988. Meanwhile, the Metropolitan Separate School Board (now the Toronto Catholic District School Board) has offered to hand over Kingsmill to ease overcrowding conditions at Michael Power/St. Joseph High School.

In March 1988, the EBE approved the closure of Kingsmill effective June 1988. At the April 28, 1988 meeting with the Metropolitan Toronto School Board and the MSSB, the Kingsmill property has been perpetually leased for 99 years which was approved in November 1988. The programs at Kingsmill and Humbergrove were consolidated into Westway High School that is renamed to Central Etobicoke High School. The site needed a complete revamp to become academically oriented schools and costs $3 million. As a result, the Kingsmill transfer money of $4.8 million was allocated for the renovation of Etobicoke School of the Arts in 1989.

The Kingsmill campus was temporarily used in early 1989 when De La Salle College was destroyed by student vandalism and flood costed over $4,000,000.00 of damage to the main building at the Fanham campus. On September 5, 1989, the school was officially reopened as Bishop Allen Academy with the area previously served by Etobicoke's first Catholic secondary schools in Our Lady of Sorrows Parish; Michael Power school for boys and St. Joseph's, Islington for girls which, having combined, moved from the area in 1993.

== See also ==
- List of high schools in Ontario
- Bishop Allen Academy
