= Jason Gavadza =

Canadian NFL and CFL football player

Jason Gavadza (born January 31, 1976, in Toronto, Ontario) is a former National Football League (NFL) tight end and Super Bowl champion as a member of the Baltimore Ravens, and also played in the Canadian Football League (CFL) as a fullback for the Toronto Argonauts, Montreal Allouettes, and BC Lions.

He graduated from Michael Power/St. Joseph High School, and from Kent State University. Drafted as tight end in the 2000 NFL Draft in the sixth round, he was a member of the Pittsburgh Steelers, Tennessee Titans, Carolina Panthers, Green Bay Packers, Baltimore Ravens, St. Louis Rams, Cincinnati Bengals and won the Super Bowl championship in 2000 as a member of the Baltimore Ravens of the NFL.
