= Etobicoke Board of Education =

Canadian public school board

Board of Education for the City of Etobicoke District 12

Location
- 1 Civic Centre Court, Etobicoke, Ontario M9C 2B3 Canada

District information
- Established: 1949
- Closed: December 31, 1997
- Chair of the board: Suzan Hall
- District ID: EBE

The Etobicoke Board of Education (EBE commonly known as School District 12), officially known as the Board of Education for the City of Etobicoke is the former public-secular school board administering the schools of Etobicoke, Ontario, headquartered in the Etobicoke Civic Centre. In 1998, it was merged into the Toronto District School Board. The former EBE offices remain in use today by the TDSB as the West Education Office.

== History ==
The Etobicoke Board of Education was formed in 1949. Around that period the district had over 50,000 students. The board expanded through the mergers of three small lakeside municipalities — the Village of Long Branch, the Town of New Toronto, and the Town of Mimico — to form the borough of Etobicoke in 1967.

In its lifetime the district has offered continuing education programs. Furthermore, it had 52 elementary schools, nine of which included the French Immersion Program. After an increasing in advertising of the programs, by January 1988 the district's programs had an increase of students.

In January 1985 65 secretaries in elementary schools of the district went on strike. At the time the Etobicoke secretaries earned $11.07 hourly or $387.52 weekly, while Toronto Board of Education secretaries earned $11.96 hourly or $418.49 weekly.

In April 1990 the district increased its tax rate by 9.9 percent, meaning each Etobicoke homeowner would be paying $130 more in school taxes. At the time, the district had a $202.3 million operating budget.

In 1991 the district was attempting to have its early French immersion program closed effective 1992.

== Schools ==
The following schools of the Etobicoke Board of Education were transferred to and remain active with the TDSB

- Burnhamthorpe Collegiate Institute
- Central Etobicoke High School (formerly Westway High School)
- Elmbanks Junior Middle Academy
- Etobicoke Collegiate Institute
- Etobicoke School of the Arts (formerly Royal York Collegiate Institute, 1953-1982)
- James S. Bell Junior Middle School (formerly Long Branch Public School)
- John English Junior Middle School (formerly Mimico High School)
- Kipling Collegiate Institute
- Lakeshore Collegiate Institute (formerly New Toronto Secondary School)
- Martingrove Collegiate Institute
- North Albion Collegiate Institute
- Richview Collegiate Institute
- Silverthorn Collegiate Institute
- Thistletown Collegiate Institute
- West Humber Collegiate Institute

The following schools of the board were transferred or sold to the MSSB (some were sold outright years later, see below):

- Alderwood Collegiate Institute (vacant since 2006, sold 2012)
- Douglas Park Public School
- Heatherbrae Middle School (sold 2004)
- Humbergrove Secondary School
- Kellier Mackay Collegiate Institute (sold 1983)
- Kingsmill Secondary School
- Queensway Public School (closed 1969, demolished 1990s)
- High Park School, Toronto (closed 1990, demolished 1996)
- Vincent Massey Collegiate Institute
- Vincent Massey Public School (formerly Daisy Avenue Public School c. 1929 and now 68 Daisy Avenue as Vincent Massey Childcare Centre)
- West Deane Public School

=== Leasing of campuses to separate board ===
In 1986, 9 of the 10 Etobicoke trustees rejected the Metropolitan Separate School Board or MSSB (now the Toronto Catholic District School Board)'s application to lease the Parkview Junior School. The MSSB wanted 400 students of the Christ the King School to attend classes at the campus. EBE had also leased three secondary school sites and five elementary school properties to the MSSB.

For a brief period in 1985, the MSSB occupied the Sunnylea Junior School building near Bloor Street West and Royal Oak Road, calling it Josyf Cardinal Slipyj Catholic School. The school had Eastern Rite Catholicism classes and Ukrainian language heritage classes. The board had evicted the MSSB from the Sunnylea building when the lease expired in July 1990 it stated that south Etobicoke neighborhoods have a shortage of classrooms, so it wanted to use the school building. Surveys from the board projected that Sunnylea would have 200 students in 1994. Area Catholic residents expressed opposition to the proposal. Later the Slipyj school was relocated to the West Deane Junior School building which was closed in 1984.
