= Smithfield, Toronto =

Part of a neighbourhood in Toronto, Ontario, Canada

Smithfield
- Neighbourhood
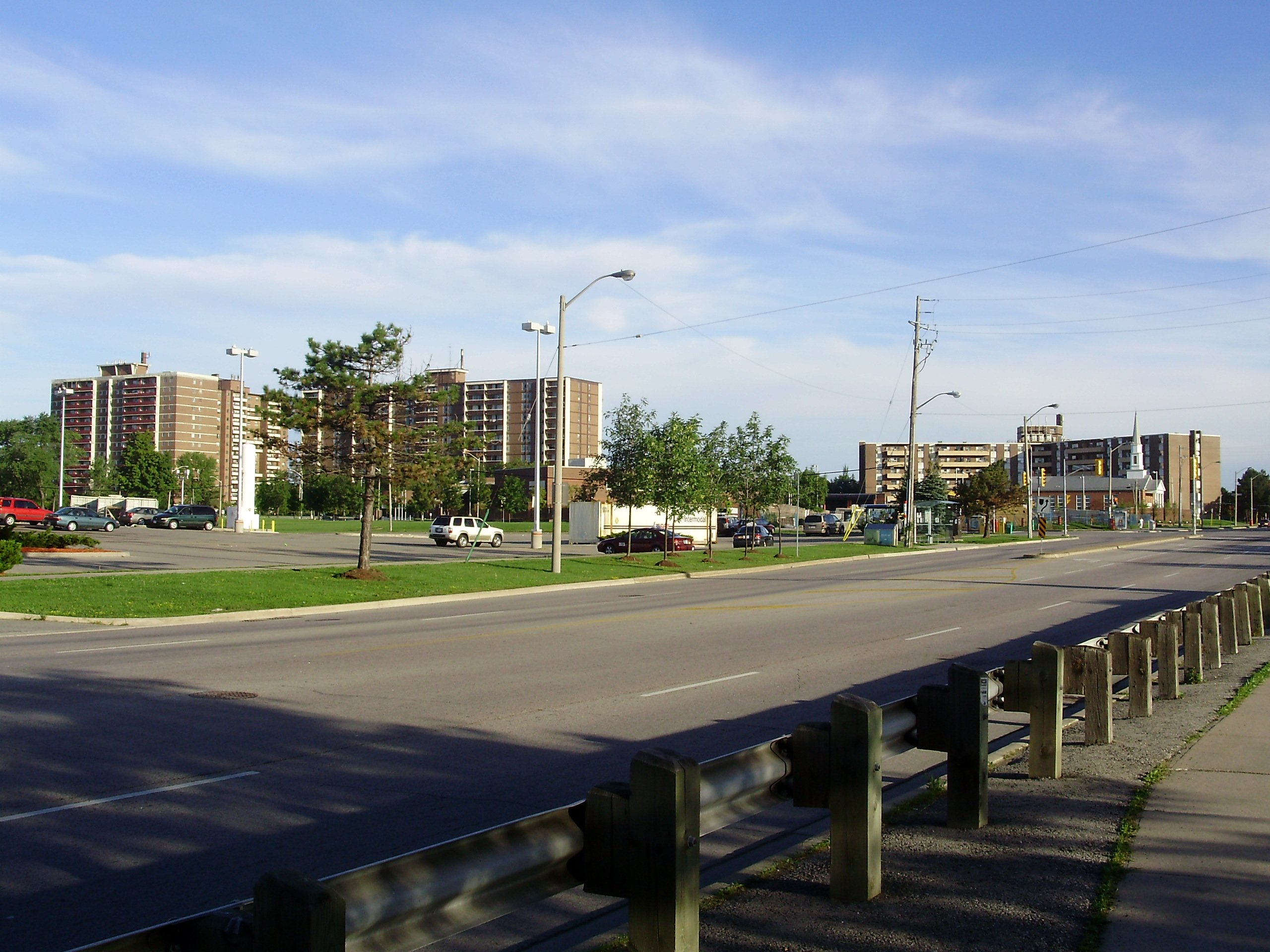
- View of Smithfield from Kipling Avenue

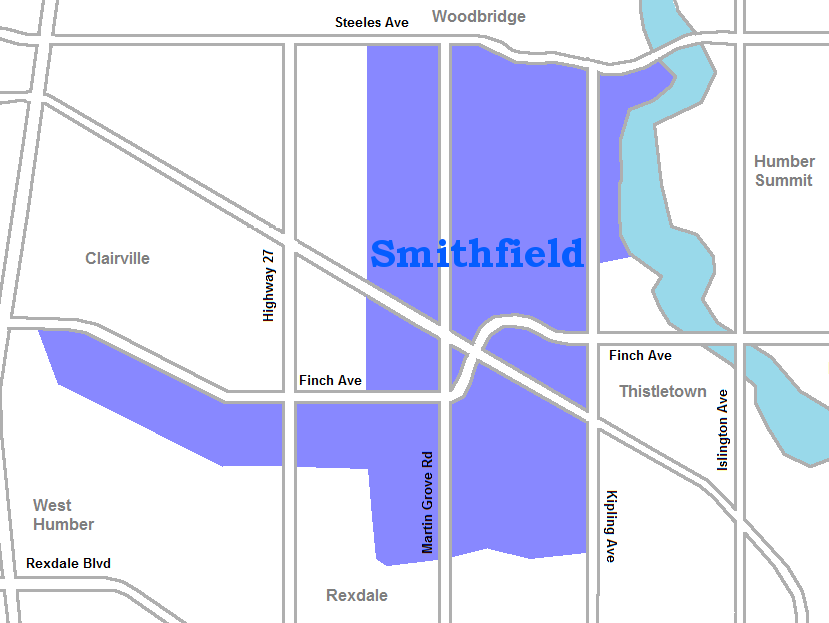

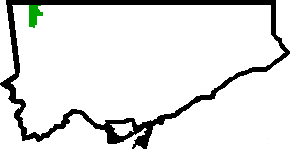
- Coordinates: 43°44′23″N 79°34′49″W
- Country: Canada
- Province: Ontario
- City: Toronto
- Established: 1870 Postal village 'Etobicoke'
- Changed municipality: 1998 Toronto from Etobicoke

Government
  - MP: John Zerucelli (Etobicoke North)
  - MPP: Doug Ford (Etobicoke North)
  - Councillor: Vincent Crisanti (Ward 1 Etobicoke North)
- Postal codes: M9V, M9W
- Area code: 416, 647 and 437

Smithfield is a neighbourhood and former village in Toronto, Ontario, Canada. Some new residents of Toronto and new immigrants to Canada are attracted to this neighbourhood, mainly because there is a large amount of affordable public housing. It is named after the former village of Smithfield located at the intersection of Albion Road and Martin Grove Road. The neighbourhood is located north of the west branch of the Humber River and west of Kipling Avenue.

Smithfield was established as a postal village in 1870 to serve the then-agricultural district. It started becoming urbanized after World War II as part of the development of the Rexdale district. Today, the area is fully urbanized. Originally part of Etobicoke Township, which later became the City of Etobicoke, it has been part of Toronto since 1998.

Primarily residential, the west and north of the neighbourhood are small industrial areas. For social purposes, the city identifies the neighbourhood as Mount Olive-Silverstone-Jamestown, named for three streets in the area. Mount Olive is the name given to the area north of Albion Road between Kipling and Martin Grove. Jamestown is the part of the community south of Albion between Kipling and Martin Grove. Silverstone covers the area west of Martin Grove and north of Finch. The northernmost section of the neighbourhood, above the hydro right of way, is known as South Steeles. The western projection of the area running along the south side of Finch is known as Woodbine Downs.

Smithfield is represented by Ward 1 Etobicoke North along with the federal and provincial ridings of Etobicoke North and the postal codes are M9V and M9W. It is patrolled by the 23 Division of the Toronto Police Service.

== Character ==
Smithfield has experienced a large influx of citizens from Eastern Europe, Asia, the Caribbean, and the Middle East. The large expanses of rowhouse developments dating to the 1930s located on Mount Olive Drive just off Kipling Ave has been home to the first newcomers especially from Somalia and the West Indies. North Albion Collegiate Institute, opened in 1962 and located on Kipling and Mount Olive, has for years held showcases for the Asian and South East Asian Communities, attracting audiences from far and wide. Directly across the street, the St. Andrews School and Father Henry Carr Secondary School reflect the Catholic tradition and culture that many resident Filipinos, and Assyrians share.

The Albion Centre (formerly known as "Shoppers World Albion") Is the main shopping mall in the area. Containing a variety of small boutiques and stores, the Albion Centre also contains such franchises as Pizza Pizza, Canadian Tire, and Shoppers Drug Mart. The Albion Cinemas have been operating since before 1970 and are still in operation. The cinemas, well known for their broadcasts of modern Bollywood/Indian/Asian films, have attracted many to this location.

Over the past few decades, multiple attempts have been made to crackdown on gang violence in Rexdale. In May 2006, Toronto Police apprehended 106 members of the "Jamestown Crips" in the largest gang sweep in Toronto's history. In total, there were over 1,000 charges laid in the anti-gang offensive called Project XXX. Sometimes known by the nickname Doomstown because of its reputation as a poor neighbourhood ridden with gang violence, the neighbourhood was the setting of the 2006 Canadian television movie Doomstown.

On June 04, 2015, more than 700 police officers participated in the series of raids, part of a multi-year investigation dubbed Project Pharaoh, which targeted a faction of the Mount Olive Crips known as "The Monstarz", who police alleged were involved in a series of deadly gunplay including 8 homicides & were known rivals to the nearby Jamestown Crips.

== Cityscape ==
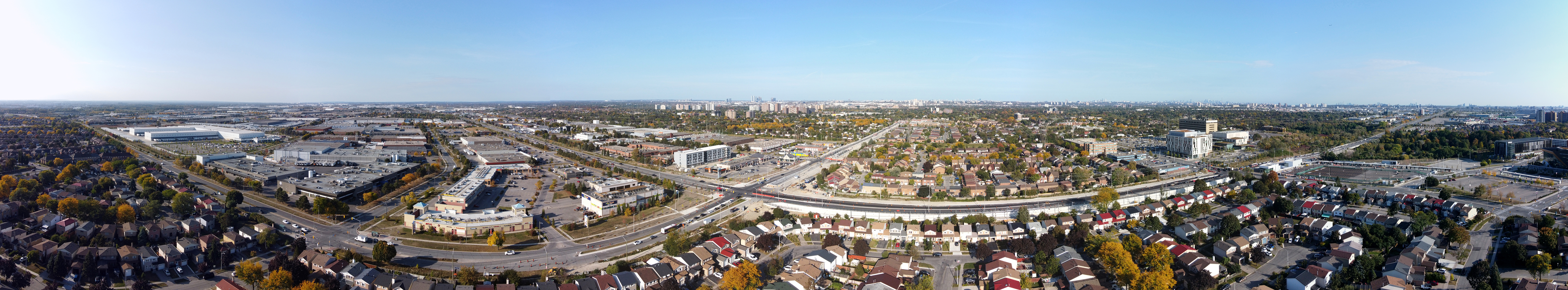
Aerial view of Clairville and Smithfield in 2023

== Institutions ==
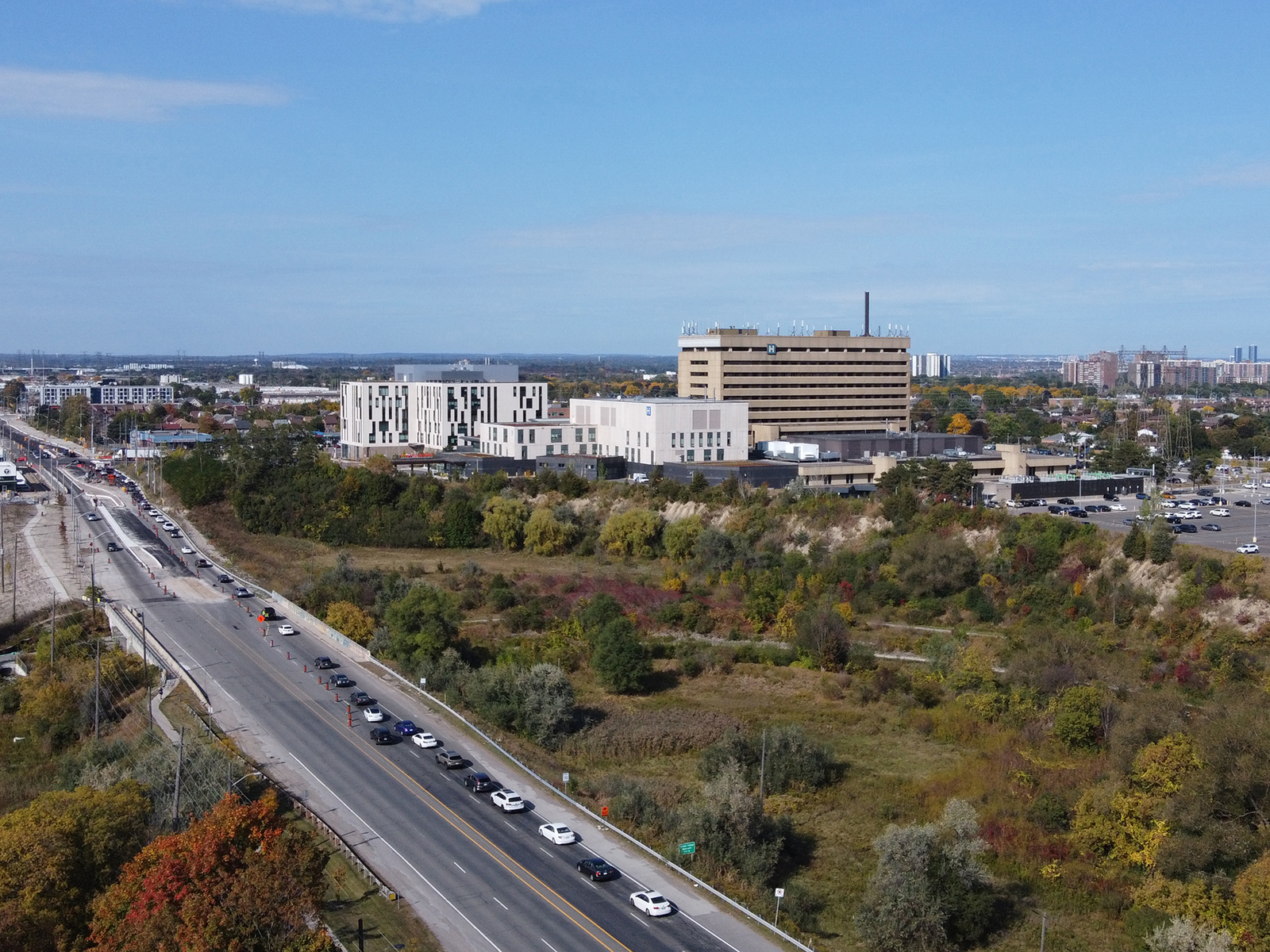
Etobicoke Hospital

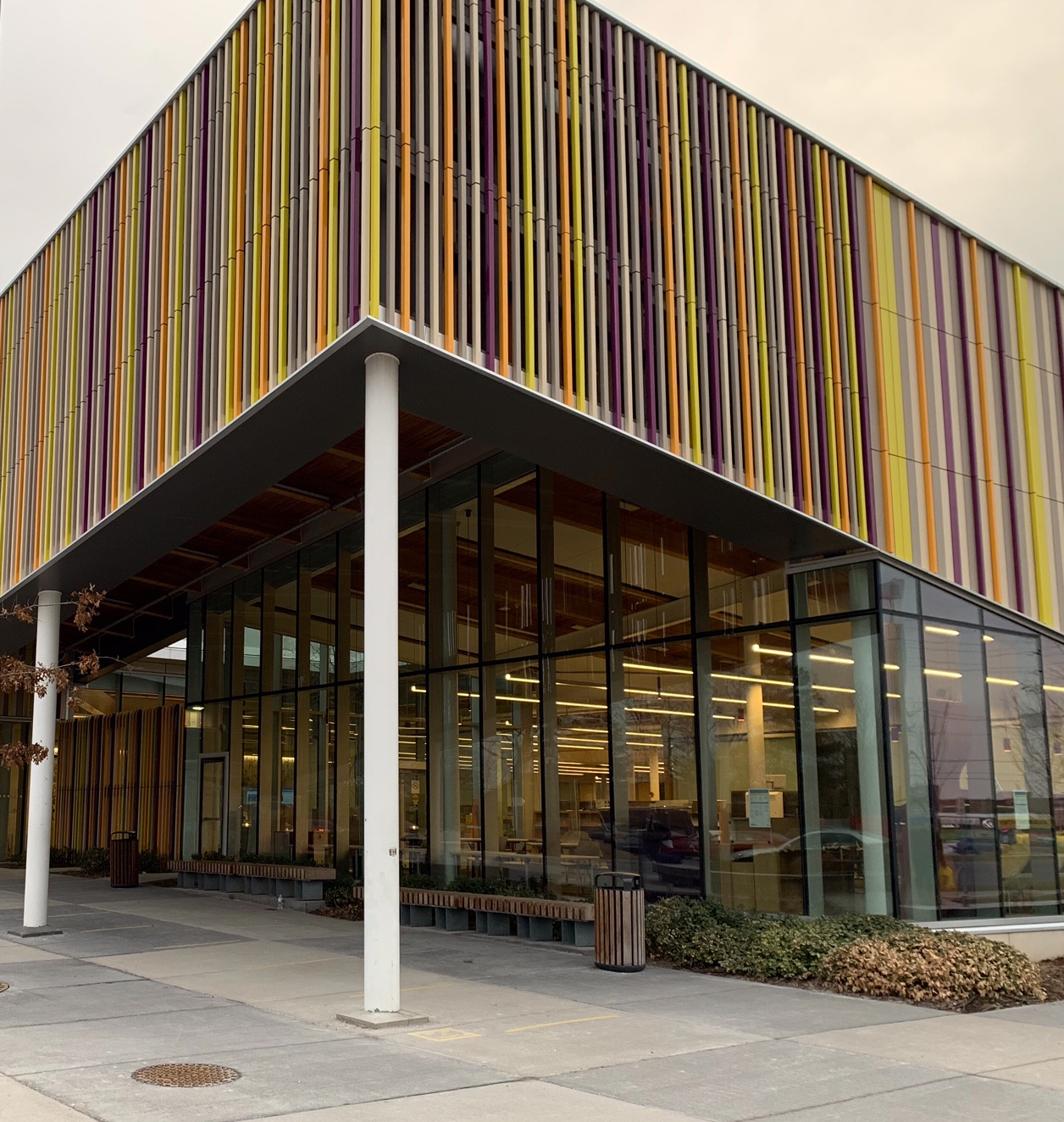
The Albion branch of Toronto Public Library is located in Smithfield.

- Etobicoke General Hospital
- Albion Public Library
- Albion Community Centre
- Albion Centre
- Finch Albion Centre

=== Parks ===
- Smithfield Park
- Highfield Park

=== Place of worship ===
- Kipling Baptist Church
- Martingrove United Church
- Rexdale Singh Sabha Religious Centre
- Saint Andrew Roman Catholic Church
- Sikh Spiritual Centre Toronto
- Thistletown Baptist Church

== Education ==
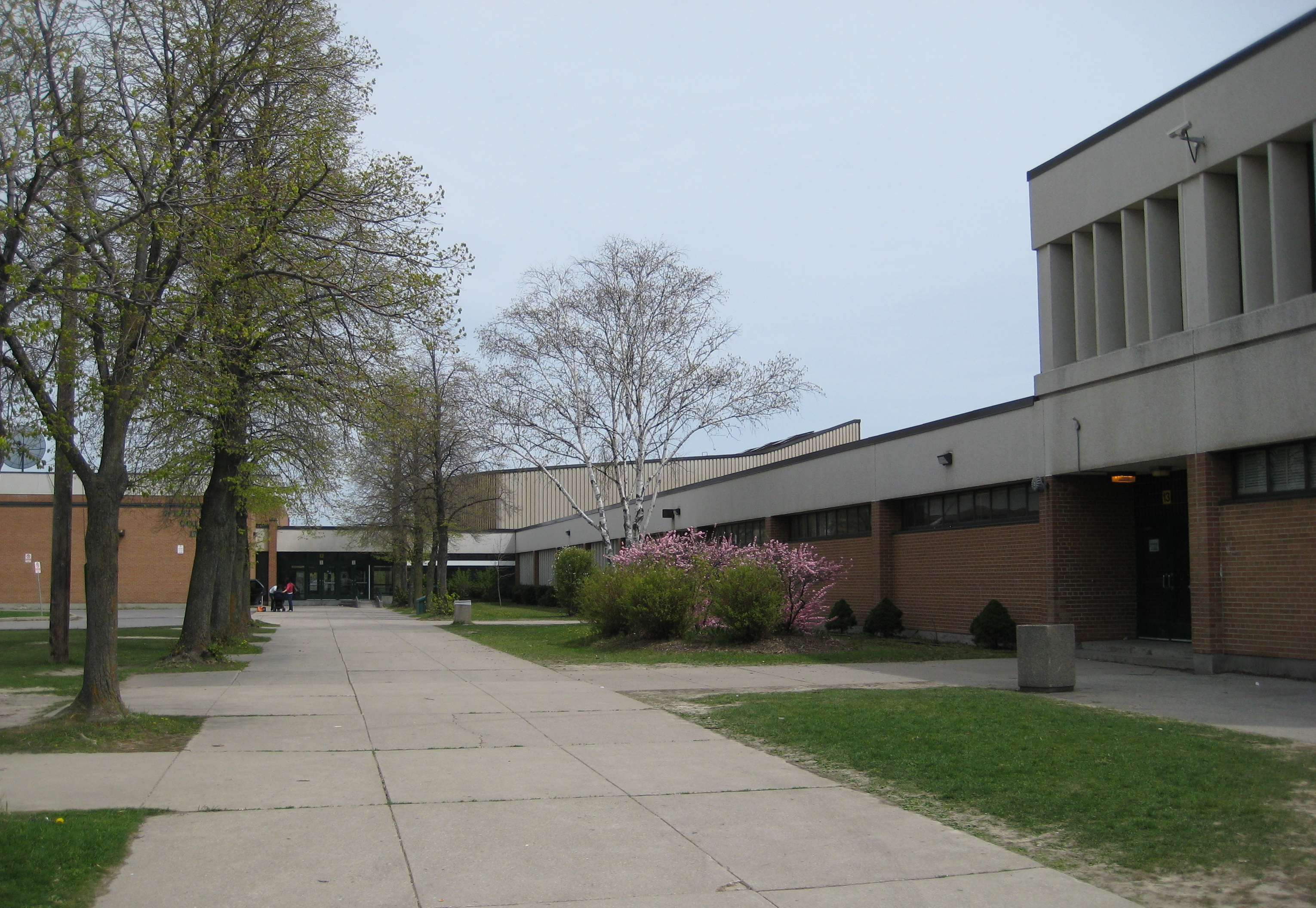
West Humber Collegiate Institute is a secondary school located in Smithfield.

Two public school boards operate elementary schools and secondary schools in the neighbourhood, the Toronto District School Board (TDSB), and the Toronto Catholic District School Board (TCDSB). Two secondary schools are located in the neighbourhood, West Humber Collegiate Institute (operated by TDSB), Father Henry Carr Catholic Secondary School (operated by TCDSB). Father Henry Carr Secondary School was relocated to Smithfield in 2007, taking the space of the former Marian Academy.

Elementary schools in the neighbourhood include:

- North Kipling Junior Middle School - A school that goes from kindergarten – grade 8, includes gifted program located on Rowntree Road and Kipling Avenue which opened in 1999. At the top of the school crest visually appeals a purple cougar cup paw to represent their school.
- Albion Heights Junior Middle School
- St. Dorothy's Catholic School
- Beaumonde Junior Middle School - A public elementary school near the intersection of Albion Road and Finch Avenue. It was opened in 1959 as a Kindergarten to Grade 8 school. From 1970 until 1984, the school operated from Kindergarten to Grade 5. After 1984, it reverted to an entire elementary program.
- Elmbank Junior Middle Academy - A public elementary school located at 10 Pittsboro Drive, near the corner of Martin Grove Road and Finch Avenue. It opened in 1967.
- Greenholme Junior Middle School - A public elementary school located at 10 Jamestown Crescent, close to the intersection of Albion Road and Kipling Avenue. It overlooks the Humber River.
- Highfield Junior School - A public elementary school located at 85 Mount Olive Drive, which opened in 1963. At the top of the school crest burns the lamp of learning that has lit the way for young children for over 170 years. The three bells on the crest represent the three locations for the school since 1845 when the first log schoolhouse was erected at the southeast corner of Rexdale Blvd. and Martin Grove Road in the village of Highfield. The black iron school bell from the second Highfield school, built of brick in 1874 at the southeast corner of Rexdale Blvd and Hwy 27, hangs at the end of the new student forum, part of the extensive addition completed in 1997. In September 2006, Highfield earned the National Quality Institute's Blue Leaf Award for excellence in education.
- Humberwood Downs Junior Middle Academy - A public elementary school located at 850 Humberwood Blvd. It was opened in 1996.
- Melody Village Junior School - A public elementary school located at 520 Silverstone Drive. It was built in 1970.
- Smithfield Middle School - A public middle school located at 175 Mount Olive Drive. It officially opened on October 17, 1966.
- John D. Parker Junior School - A public elementary school located at 202 Mount Olive Drive. It was opened in 1974 and was expanded in 1994 and 1996. The school was named in honour of Mr. John D. Parker, one of the original seven trustees elected to the Board of Education for the Township of Etobicoke in May 1969. He served on the Board from that time until the end of 1972.
- St Angela Catholic Elementary School

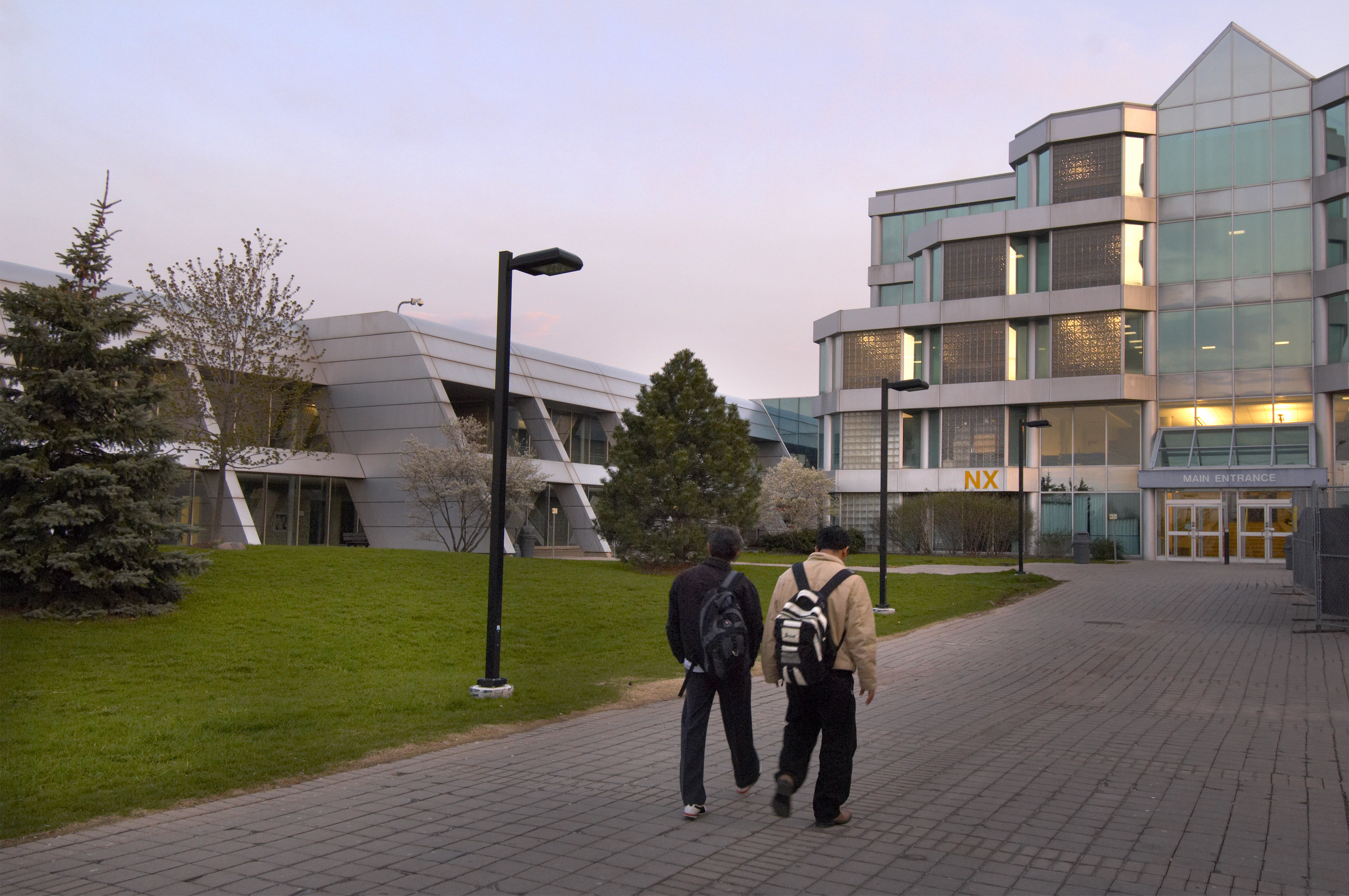
The North Campus of Humber College is located in Smithfield.

The North Campus of Humber College, a post-secondary institution, is also in the neighbourhood. The University of Guelph's satellite campus, the University of Guelph-Humber, is on the same campus as Humber College's North Campus.

== Transportation ==
=== Roads ===
One of the area's most high-profile roads is John Garland Boulevard. The street was named for Nipissing MP and Minister of National Revenue John Richard 'Jack' Garland and fought to create housing development like Thistletown. Garland died of a heart attack in 1964 and the street was named in his honour in 1965.
