= Vincent Massey Collegiate Institute =

Vincent Massey Collegiate Institute (Vincent Massey Centre)
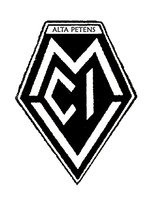

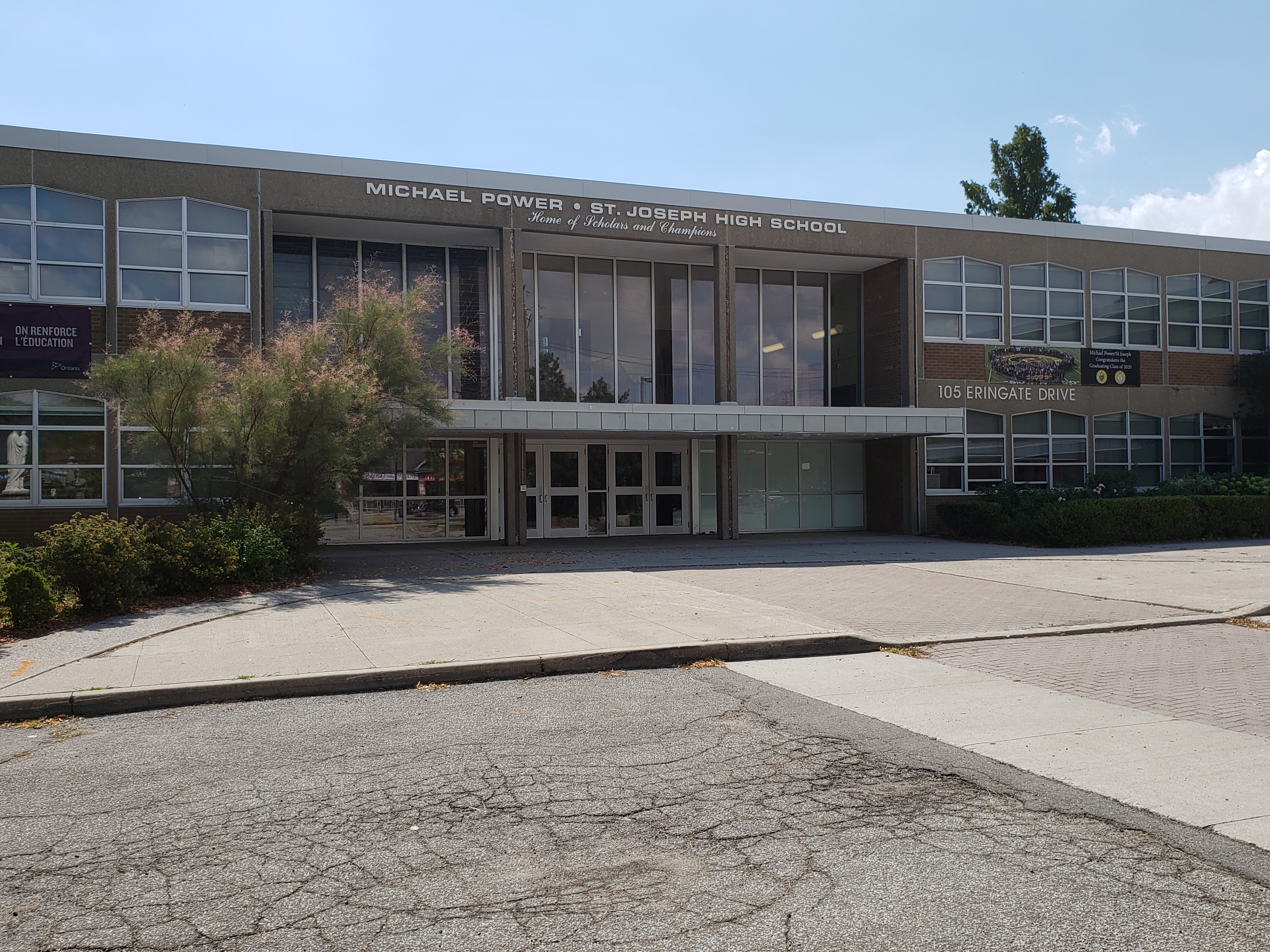

Location
- 105 Eringate Drive; Toronto, Ontario, M9C 3Z7; Canada; 43.659343°N 79.582311°W

Information
- School type: Public High School; Adult High School
- Motto: Alta Petens (Seeking the Heights)
- Founded: 1961
- Status: Leased out
- Closed: 1985
- School board: Toronto District School Board (Etobicoke Board of Education)
- Oversight: Toronto Lands Corporation
- Superintendent: Susan Winter
- Area trustee: Chris Glover
- School number: 949485; 949663
- Grades: 9–13
- Enrollment: 1644
- Language: English
- Colours: Blue and Black
- Public transit access: TTC: North/South: 112 West Mall; West/East: 48 Rathburn; Rapid Transit: Kipling, Royal York; GO Transit: Train: Kipling
- Website: www.vmcireunion.com

Vincent Massey Collegiate Institute (Vincent Massey, VMCI, or Massey) is a Toronto District School Board facility that was previously operated as public secondary school in Toronto, Ontario, Canada. It was operated by the Etobicoke Board of Education in the former suburb of Etobicoke from its opening in 1961 until its closure in 1985 and later became the Vincent Massey Centre as an adult school until 1993. Owned and overseen by the board's arm's-length division, Toronto Lands Corporation, it is one of two schools in Etobicoke to be named for the late Governor General of Canada, the other was Vincent Massey Public School (which also closed in the 1980s).

== History ==
On May 10, 1960, the Etobicoke Board of Education agreed to construct Vincent Massey Collegiate Institute at a cost of $1,120,000 with 14 standard classrooms, 1 art, 1 music, 2 science labs, 1 library, 1 home economics, 1 shop, 1 typing room, double gym and cafeteria. After hefty construction work, the school opened its doors in September 1961. The school was designed in modern architectural style by architectural firm D. Ross King.

The school had erected its first addition in 1963, next is the second addition in 1966 with the new western classroom wings and the auditorium, then the third addition being the library in 1970, and concluded with the fourth and final addition containing extra classrooms, single gymnasium, and technical shops built in 1975.

During its existence, it produced two Reach for the Top National Championship teams in 1966 and 1978, and was the only high school in Canada to accomplish this during the original 20 year Canadian Broadcasting Corporation production of the show.

After its closure in 1985 due to low enrollment, the building served for several years as an adult education centre and later moved to Burnhamthorpe Collegiate Institute in September 1987.

Later, the building was used as a temporary campus of Dufferin-Peel Separate School Board's Philip Pocock Catholic Secondary School in Mississauga, Ontario while the Pocock primary campus was under renovation. Since then, most of its students were rehoused at Silverthorn Collegiate Institute. The Pocock school began leasing the Massey site in September 1987. Massey served as the Pocock Etobicoke campus, serving 1,200 students in grades 11–13. The school's 9th- and 10th-grade students remained at the original Pocock. Originally the school planned to lease the Massey campus for at least five years. In May 1988 the Dufferin-Peel separate board announced that it would give Massey to the Ontario government in exchange for an addition funded by the provincial government built at the original Pocock and at least $10 million. The Mississauga News described the relationship as a "strong tie to Mississauga."

A reunion for those who attended the campus from 1962 to 1985 was held in 2009. It was the first full reunion for the student body in 20 years.

== See also ==
- List of high schools in Ontario
- Michael Power-St. Joseph High School
