= Central Etobicoke High School =

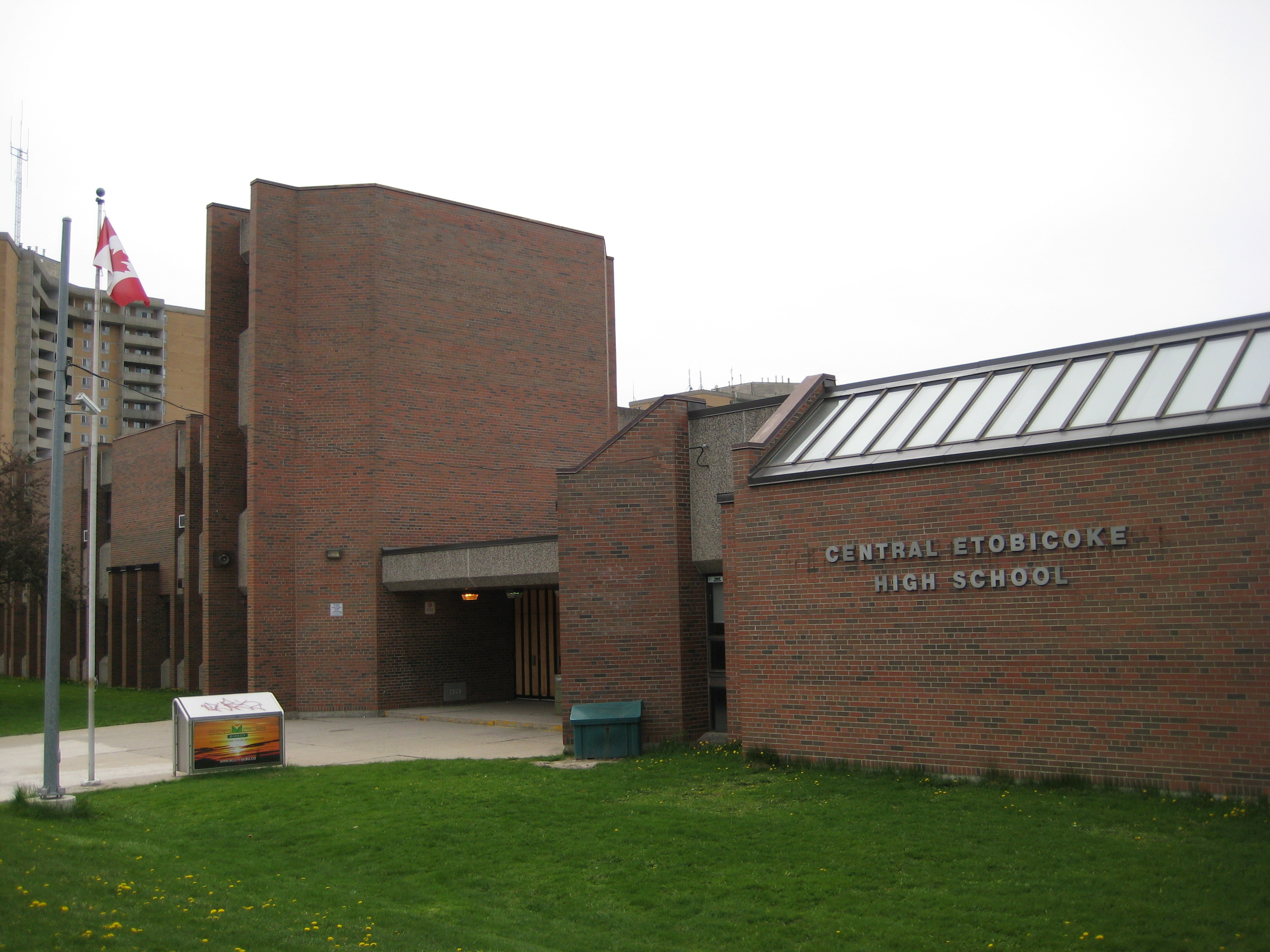

Location
- 10 Denfield Street; Toronto, Ontario, M9R 3H1; Canada; 43°40′44″N 79°33′19″W

Information
- Former name: Westway High School (1969–1988)
- School type: Public High School; Special Ed High School
- Founded: 1969
- School board: Toronto District School Board (Etobicoke Board of Education)
- Superintendent: Susan Winter
- Area trustee: Chris Glover
- School number: 2816 / 952842
- Principal: Marta Smodis
- Grades: 9-12
- Enrolment: 134 (2019-20)
- Language: English
- Colours: Yellow and Black
- Team name: Central Etobicoke Eagles
- Website: schools.tdsb.on.ca/centraletobicoke/

Central Etobicoke High School (or Central Etobicoke, CEHS); formerly Westway High School is a secondary school in Toronto, Ontario, Canada. It is located at 10 Denfield Street, bordered by Widdicombe Hill Blvd to the South and Clement Rd to the North, in the Richview neighbourhood of the former suburb of Etobicoke. It is operated by the Toronto District School Board since being transferred from the Etobicoke Board of Education in 1997.

== History ==
Westway High School was established as a small high school in 1969 by the Etobicoke Board of Education.

As enrolment decreased in Etobicoke's public schools during the 1980s, many seriously underpopulated public schools in the area were abandoned as the children were transferred to the Catholic school system when full funding was introduced. As a result, Central Etobicoke High School was formed in 1988 at the same site and assimilated its basic level programs at Westway, Humbergrove Secondary School and Kingsmill Secondary School, with both of the latter schools closed and transferred to the Metropolitan Separate School Board (now the Toronto Catholic District School Board).

== See also ==
- Education in Ontario
- List of secondary schools in Ontario
