= Michael Power - St. Joseph High School =

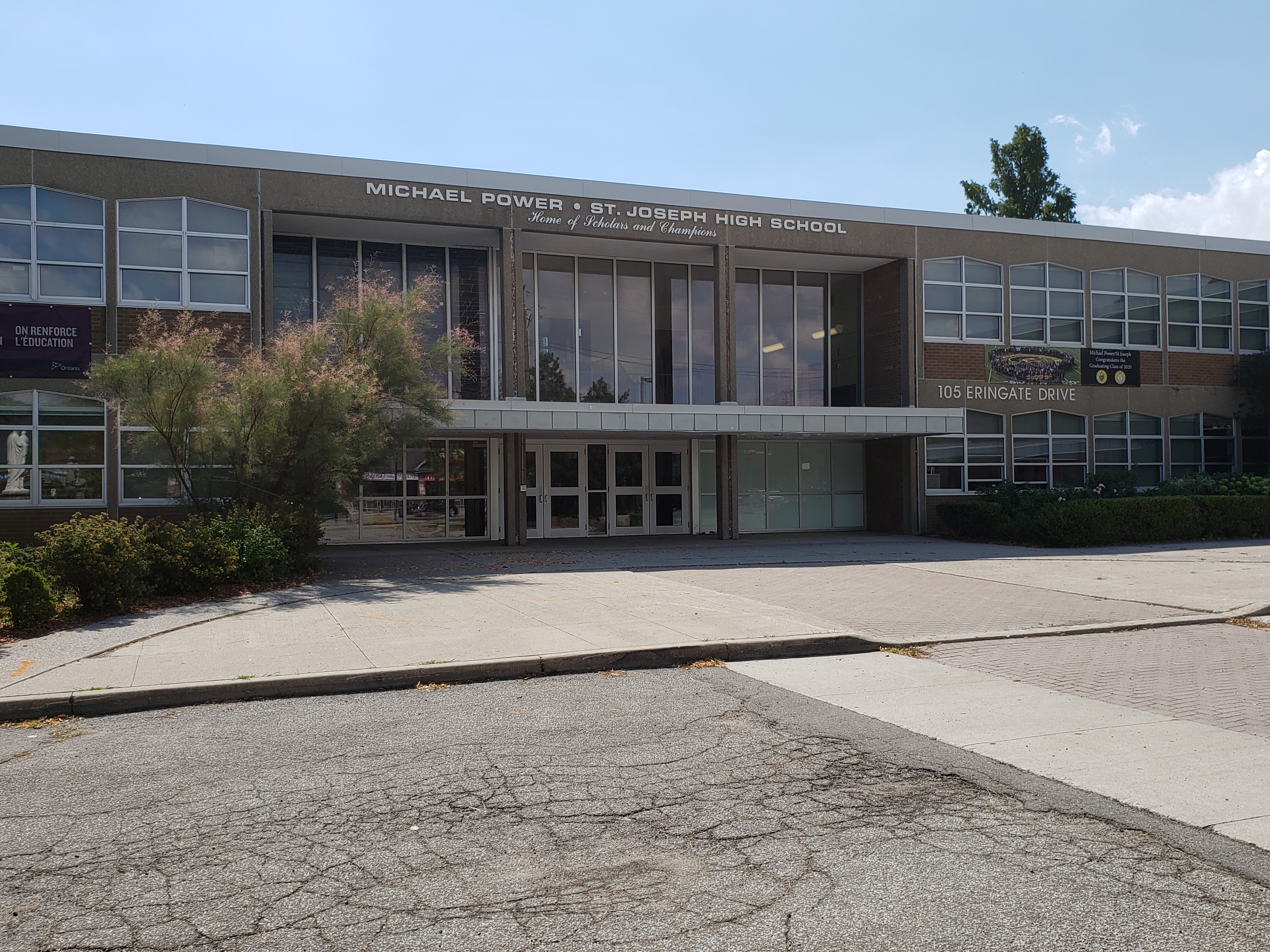
- Michael Power - St. Joseph

Location
- 105 Eringate Drive; Toronto, Ontario, M9C 3Z7; Canada; 43.6593°N 79.5823°W

Information
- Former name: St. Joseph High School, Islington (1949–1982); Michael Power High School (1957–1982) Vincent Massey Collegiate Institute (1961–1985)
- School type: Separate, Catholic High School; IB World School
- Motto: Doce Me Bonitatem et Disciplinam et Scientiam; Teach me goodness, discipline, and knowledge • Congregavit nos in unum Christi amor The love of Christ has gathered us together into one
- Religious affiliations: Roman Catholic (Basilian Fathers and Sisters of St. Joseph)
- Founded: September 12, 1949; 76 years ago - as St. Joseph High School, Islington; September 3, 1957; 68 years ago - as Michael Power High School
- School board: Toronto Catholic District School Board (Metropolitan Separate School Board)
- Superintendent: Flora Cifelli; Area 1
- Area trustee: Markus de Domenico; Ward 2
- School number: 529 / 731820
- Principal: Lisa Tomeczek
- Grades: 9-12
- Enrolment: 2090 (2023-2024)
- Language: English
- Colours: Maroon and Gold
- Slogan: Home of Scholars and Champions
- Mascot: Trojan
- Team name: Power Trojans
- Parish: Nativity of Our Lord
- Specialist High Skills Major: Health and Wellness; Sports
- Program Focus: Extended French; International Baccalaureate; Gifted
- Website: www.tcdsb.org/o/michaelpowerstjoseph

Michael Power - St. Joseph High School (colloquially known as Michael Power, MPSJ or Power) is a Catholic secondary school in Toronto, Ontario, Canada. The school was founded as an amalgamation of two independent schools in the neighbourhood, Michael Power High School (an all-male school secondary school founded by the Basilian Fathers in 1957 initially known as St. Francis High School, later Bishop Power High School) and St. Joseph Islington High School (an all-female school led by the Sisters of St. Joseph in 1949) with the two schools amalgamated in 1982 officially. The school joined the Metropolitan Separate School Board (now Toronto Catholic District School Board) in 1987.

In 1993, Michael Power - St. Joseph moved west and north to the former site of Vincent Massey Collegiate Institute, built in 1961 by the Etobicoke Board of Education (later amalgamated with the Toronto District School Board) and closed in 1985, on Eringate Drive, in which the campus has been leased to the MSSB/TCDSB since 1990.

It is the largest high school in the Toronto Catholic District School Board and one of the largest secondary school populations in Toronto with 1941 students in the 2017–18 year and the second largest in Toronto. MPSJ is ranked 244 out of 739 in the 2018-2019 Fraser Institute report card with a 6.9 rating. MPSJ has offered the International Baccalaureate (IB) program since 2002 and is one of the few TCDSB schools to offer it.

The mottos for the school are in the Basilian tradition of "Doce Me Bonitatem et Disciplinam et Scientiam" (Teach me goodness, discipline and knowledge) and the Sister of St. Joseph belief of "Congregavit nos in unum Christi amor" (The love of Christ has gathered us together into one).

== History ==
=== Background of namesakes ===
The Sisters of St. Joseph as founded in Le Puy by the Jesuit Jean Paul Médaille on October 15, 1650. On the following March 10, the local bishop, Henri de Maupas, granted ecclesiastical approval to these women. On December 13, 1651, the Sisters of St. Joseph presented themselves to the Royal Notary in Le Puy-en-Velay for their legal incorporation. The Sisters of St. Joseph at Toronto came into existence in 1851. The sisters taught in many schools across Canada since their establishment in the country.

Michael Power was born in Halifax, Nova Scotia, Canada to Captain William Power and Mary Roach. He went to Seminary of St. Sulpice, Montreal and Seminary of Quebec and was ordained a priest in 1827 by Bishop Dubois. He served as missionary priest of the Archdiocese of Québec and the Diocese of Montréal until 1839 when he was appointed Vicar General of Montréal. Power was canonically erected as Bishop of Toronto in 1841 by Pope Gregory XVI. Father Michael Power was appointed the first Catholic Bishop of Toronto. He was also the first English-speaking Catholic bishop to be born in Canada. His tenure came to an end as he died from typhus in Toronto on October 1, 1847, while ministering to recently arrived Irish immigrants, escaping the Great Famine.

=== The school history ===
The present school began as two distinct high schools in the Islington-City Centre West neighbourhood (better known as Six Points) of Kipling, Dundas and Bloor. Auxiliary Bishop Francis V. Allen of Our Lady of Sorrows Parish was instrumental on setting up two high schools in the Archdiocese of Toronto for Etobicoke's Roman Catholic community. The first principal of that school was Sister Mary Rita C.S.J.

Eight years later, starting in 1957, the Basilian Fathers started Michael Power High School, an all-boys high school on 5055 Dundas Street West behind a farmhouse, in an orchard and next to an Esso station, named after the first Catholic bishop of Toronto. Initially, the Basilians wanted to name the school after one of their patrons, St. Francis. This led to James Charles McGuigan's advice to the Basilians to settle the name of Bishop Power High School for the deeds and documents, which the name was later displayed on the "1957" cornerstone. Eventually, the Archdiocese established the school name of Michael Power High School as its official name. Construction of the school began in 1956 and the building was completed within the span of nine months until it opened on September 3 of the following year.

Under the school's founding principal Reverend John Mullins C.S.B., six Basilian Fathers were appointed to run the school the first year, with 160 students enrolled and tuition was $150. McGuigan officially opened and blessed the school on September 15, 1957.

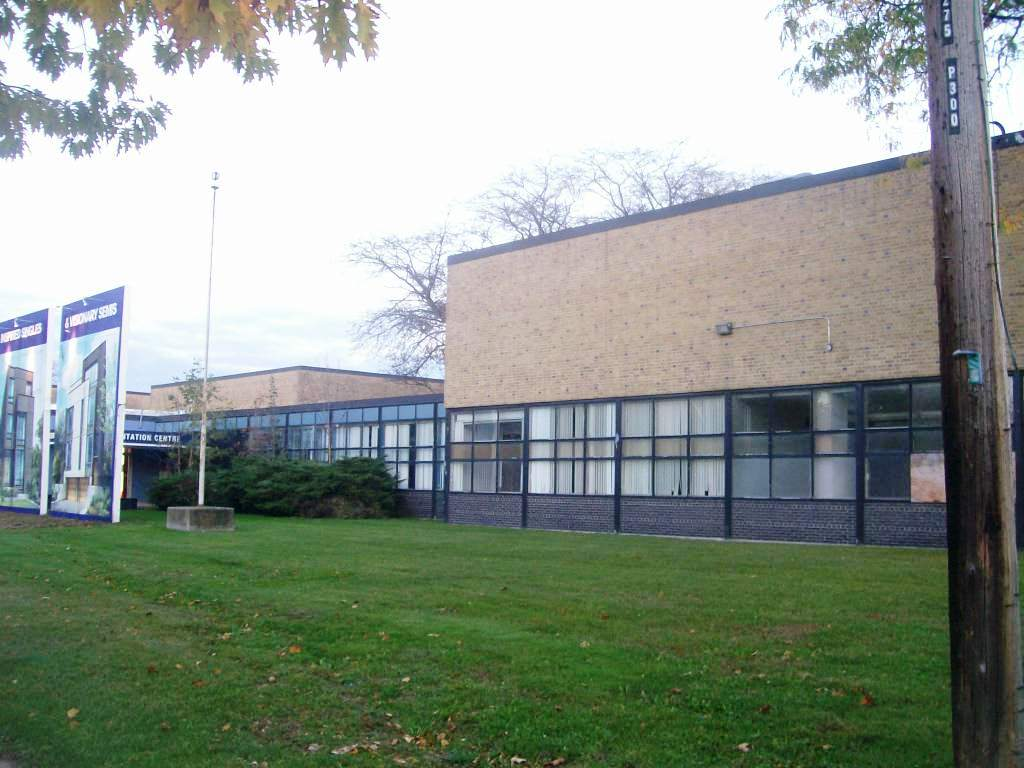
The southern campus of Michael Power - St. Joseph that established in spring of 1985 that was evolved into today's Father John Redmond

In September 1993, the school moved to its present location on 105 Eringate Drive, the former home of Vincent Massey Collegiate Institute, which was closed in 1985 by the Etobicoke Board of Education due to low enrolment and the property was transferred to the MSSB by July 1, 1990. However, that site was served as an adult learning centre and the campus for Mississauga's Philip Pocock Catholic Secondary School for grades 11-13 from 1987 to 1992. Following the retirement of Fr. Paul James and the withdrawal of the Basilian Fathers and the Sisters of St. Joseph in 1995, the school was turned over to lay teachers and administration team. Eventually, the area served by MPSJ was filled the void by the opening of Bishop Allen Academy in 1989, in which the school was named after the former pastor of Our Lady of Sorrows.

At one point, the old buildings on Dundas and Bloor served as the new campus for Monsignor Fraser College from 1994 until it moved to Thistletown Blvd (later Plunkett Blvd. and now on Norfinch Drive) when the schools were demolished in the late 1990s and was sold to the condo developer, Pemberton Group to make way for the condos that were built on the old campuses in 2003 and a park built as well.

== Notable alumni ==
- Drake Berehowsky, NHL hockey player, former Toronto Maple Leaf
- Connor Brown, NHL hockey player, current Edmonton Oilers
- Bonnie Crombie, MP for Mississauga—Streetsville (2008–2011), City Councillor Ward 5 (Mississauga) 2011–2014, Mayor of Mississauga (2014–2024), Leader of the Ontario Liberal Party (2023–present)
- Cynthia Dale, actress
- Jennifer Dale, actress
- Jason Gavadza, CFL/NFL football player
- Guy Giorno, Chief of Staff to Prime Minister Stephen Harper and Ontario Premier Mike Harris
- Glenn Goldup, NHL hockey player
- Mike Kennedy, NHL/DEL hockey player, former Toronto Maple Leaf
- Chris Kolankowski, Toronto Argonauts Offensive Lineman
- James Maloney, MP Etobicoke-Lakeshore
- Mark Nohra, CFL/NFL football player
- Gerry O'Flaherty, NHL hockey player, former Toronto Maple Leaf
- Brendan O'Leary-Orange, Canadian football player
- Mike Pelyk, NHL/WHA hockey player, former Toronto Maple Leaf
- Evan Rodrigues, NHL hockey player, Florida Panthers
- Brendan Shanahan, former NHL hockey player, former league official, current President Toronto Maple Leaf Hockey Club

== See also ==
- Education in Ontario
- List of secondary schools in Ontario
- Vincent Massey Collegiate Institute
