= Kipling Collegiate Institute =

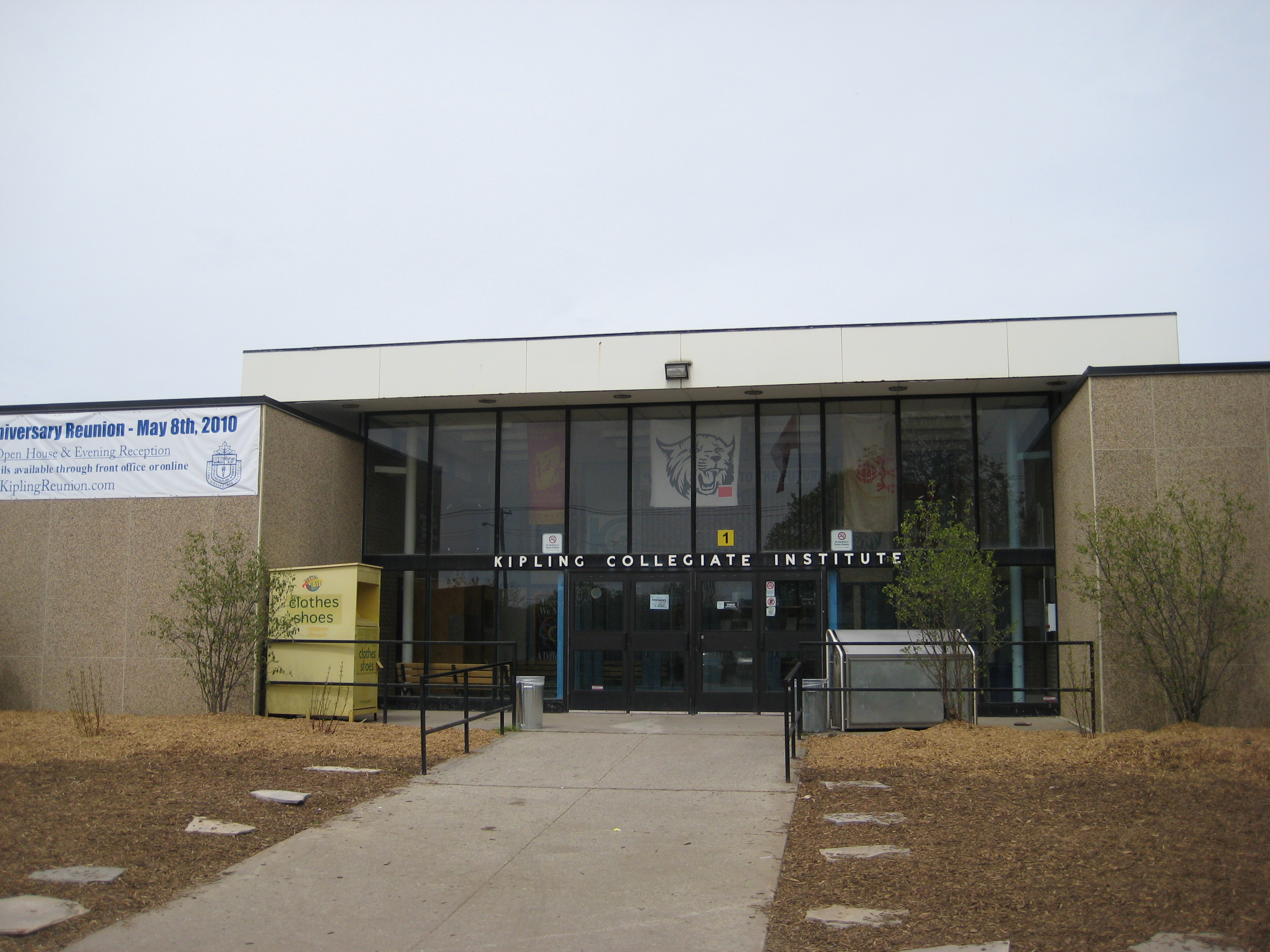

Location
- 380 The Westway; Toronto, Ontario, M9R 1H4; Canada; 43.6853°N 79.5622°W

Information
- School type: Public High school
- Motto: Portas ad Futura Aperimus (We open the doors to the future)
- Founded: 1960
- School board: Toronto District School Board (Etobicoke Board of Education)
- Superintendent: Beth Butcher; LC1, Executive Superintendent; Angela Nardi-Addesa; LN03
- Area trustee: Dan MacLean; Ward 2
- School number: 2803 / 920231
- Principal: Melvin Lowe
- Grades: 9-12
- Enrolment: 732 (2013-14)
- Language: English
- Schedule type: Semestered
- Colour: Oxford Blue And Cambridge Blue
- Team name: Kipling Wildkats
- Website: schools.tdsb.on.ca/kiplingci/

Kipling Collegiate Institute (Kipling CI, KCI, or Kipling) is a public high school in Toronto, Ontario, Canada. It is located in the former suburb of Etobicoke under the management of the Toronto District School Board, operating since 1960.

== History ==
Kipling Collegiate was constructed in 1959 and opened its doors in September 1960. The school was built in a modernist design by architect Gordon Adamson.

The school merged with Scarlett Heights Entrepreneurial Academy in 2018 and attempts to rename the school failed.

== See also ==
- Education in Ontario
- List of secondary schools in Ontario
