= Burnhamthorpe Collegiate Institute =

Burnhamthorpe Collegiate Institute Burnhamthorpe Adult Learning Centre
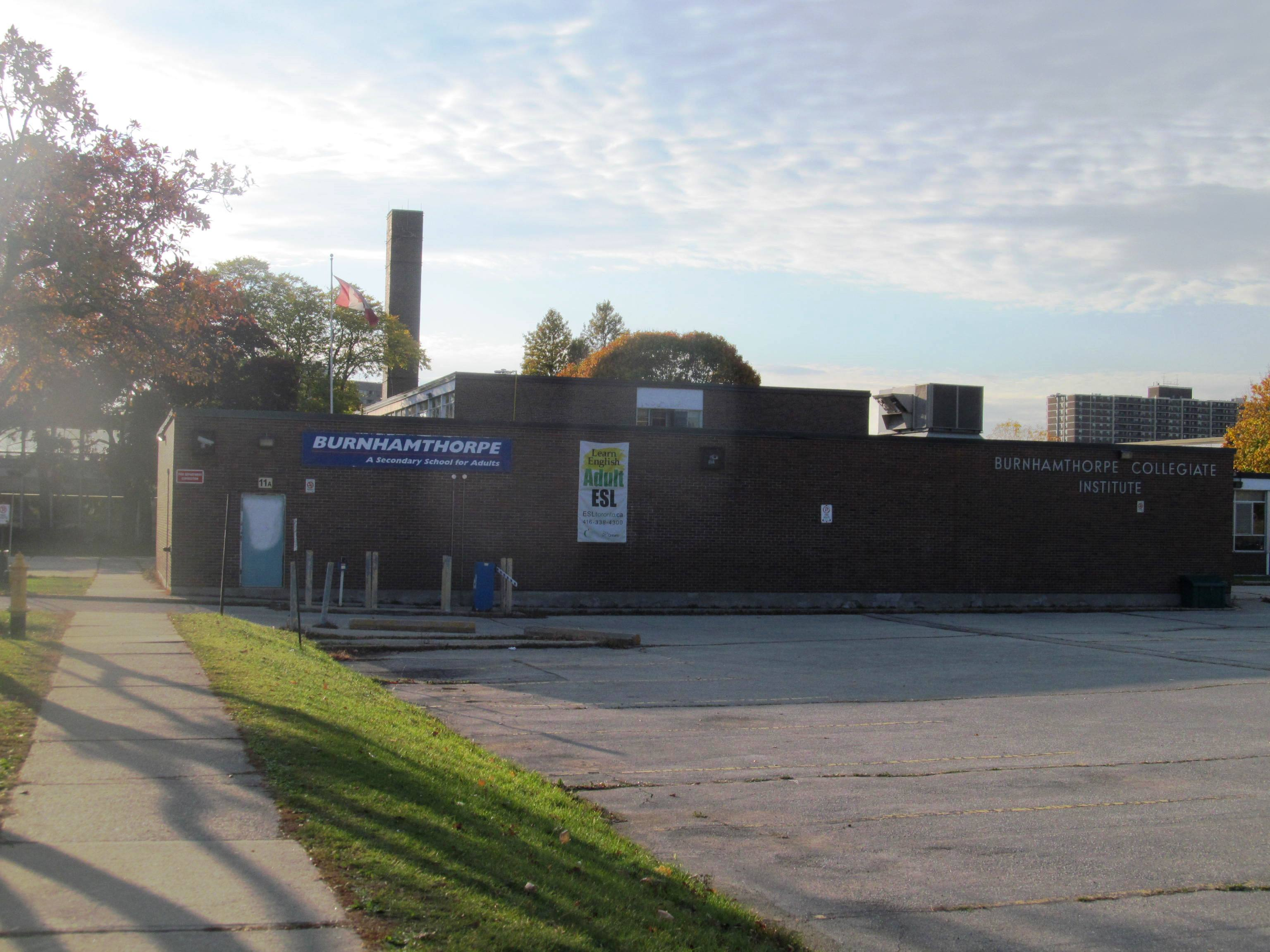

Location
- 500 The East Mall; Toronto, Ontario, M9B 2C4; Canada; 43°38′58.668″N 79°33′42.624″W

Information
- School type: Alternative high school Adult high school
- Motto: Quisque Praestet Officium (No matter whose attention offers)
- Religious affiliation: Secular
- Founded: 1956; 70 years ago
- School board: Toronto District School Board (Etobicoke Board of Education)
- Superintendent: Peter Chang
- Area trustee: Dan MacLean
- School number: 2832 / 897485; 2801 / 897485
- Principal: Eric Dallin
- Grades: 9–12
- Enrolment: Adult: 800; EdVance: 260 (2023–24)
- Language: English
- Colours: Navy, White and Red
- Team name: Burnhamthorpe Buccaneers
- Website: schoolweb.tdsb.on.ca/burnhamthorpehome
- Last updated: April 14, 2025

Burnhamthorpe Collegiate Institute and Adult Learning Centre (Burnhamthorpe CI, BCI, Burnhamthorpe ALC, BCALC, or Burnhamthorpe) is an adult and alternative high school in Toronto, Ontario, Canada. It is located in the Eatonville neighbourhood of the former suburb of Etobicoke. It has operated since 1956, currently by the Toronto District School Board, originally part of the Etobicoke Board of Education. It offers credit courses to adult learners (21 and over) and to young adults (18–20). The motto for Burnhamthorpe is Quisque Praestet Officium which translates to "No matter whose attention offers".

== History ==
The school was constructed in 1955 and opened on September 4, 1956, to students. The original street address was 76 Keane Avenue. The building was designed by architects Shore and Moffat. Burnhamthorpe was officially opened on November 9, 1956.

During the 1966 school year BCI shared classrooms with students at Martingrove Collegiate Institute, whose school was not completed in time for the start of the school year. In the 1970s, faculty included future Mississauga mayor Carolyn Parrish.

== Notable alumni ==
- Robin Duke – actress, Second City Television and Saturday Night Live
- Catherine O'Hara – actress and writer, Second City Television, Schitt's Creek, Home Alone franchise
- Linda Manzer – luthier (guitar maker)
- Nik Ranieri – Supervising Animator, Walt Disney Feature Animation
- George Smitherman – former Ontario Deputy Premier

== See also ==
- Education in Ontario
- List of secondary schools in Ontario
