= Silverthorn Collegiate Institute =

Public high school in Toronto, Ontario, Canada

- The crest of Silverthorn Collegiate Institute

Location
- 291 Mill Road; Toronto, Ontario, M9C 1Y5; Canada; 43.638080°N 79.580197°W

Information
- School type: High School
- Motto: "Nil Veriteur Veritas" (The Truth Fears Nothing)
- Founded: 1964
- School board: Toronto District School Board (Etobicoke Board of Education)
- Superintendent: Susan Winter
- Area trustee: Chris Glover
- School number: 2811 / 941425
- Principal: Mark Varvas
- Grades: 9-12
- Enrolment: 875 (2019-20)
- Language: English
- Schedule type: Semestered
- Area: Burnhamthorpe Road and Mill Road
- Colours: Garnet, Green and Silver
- Mascot: Spartacus the Spartan
- Team name: Silverthorn Spartans
- Yearbook: Veritas
- Website: www.silverthornci.com

Silverthorn Collegiate Institute is a public high school in Toronto, Ontario, Canada. It is located in the neighbourhood of Markland Wood in the former suburb of Etobicoke. It is under the sanction of the Toronto District School Board (the successor to the former Etobicoke Board of Education). The name comes from the Silverthorn Woods that borders to the south and the west. This was the northern limit of an old property known locally as the Silverthorn Mill Farm.

== History ==
The Silverthorn name, in coming from the Somerset/Wiltshire county areas of Southwest England, have this surname originating from the Holy Thorn of Glastonbury. The first Silverthorns to come to North America seems to have arrived and settled in New Jersey (and Virginia) well before the American Revolution. The New Jersey branch lost all of their land holdings since they were 'loyalists' and came to Canada, receiving land grants via the United Empire Loyalist grants. Although there is no 'official' coat of arms for this surname, there is a very old 'unofficial' one (from the Bristol/Bathe area of Wiltshire County, England) that often surfaces. Researchers of this surname state that there are more Silverthorn's in the Toronto white pages and surrounding cemeteries than any other area in the world. Please refer to the 1982 Silverthorn History published by Frank Fremont Reed, with the English Origins co-authored by William D Silverthorn (both of California, USA).

When the Markland Wood's area was developed in the early 1960s, the Etobicoke Board of Education (the forerunner of the TDSB) decided to build a secondary school for the area. The school was to be named Silverthorn Collegiate Institute after the family who had first settled the area. The cornerstone was laid in 1963, and the school opened in September 1964 with a teaching staff of 24 and a support staff of 7. The building was designed by Dunlop, Wardell, Matsui & Aitken Architects. Murray Young was the first principal. The school had only grades 9, 10, and 11 in 1964. In the next two years, it added grades 12 and 13. In 1968-69 the school was doubled in size, with the addition of an auditorium, the library, science labs and technical and business areas. A second gym was added later on.

SCI is a semestered school. Days run from 9:00 am to 3:15 pm. Silverthorn's colours are garnet, green, and silver and its mascot is a Spartan. The school's motto is "Nil Veretur Veritas" which is Latin for "The Truth Fears Nothing".

== Sports ==
Silverthorn C.I. boasts a number of high-level sports athletes, as the school is one of few with a high-performers (HP) sports program. The Silverthorn HP program offers students balancing school and intense training schedules, a flexible timetable to balance commitments, allowing students to strive for athletic excellence while maintaining academic achievement. Depending on training schedules, the students may attend school for a half-day in order to practice the other half.

Sports included: Basketball, Hockey, Gymnastics, Swimming, Rowing, Soccer, Football, Track & Field, Tennis, Volleyball, Baseball, Skiing and much more.

== Arts ==
At Silverthorn, they also place a focus on the Arts through a Specialist High Skills Major in Arts and Culture (SHSM). SHSM is a program that allows students to choose to specialize in learning in the arts (performing arts, visual arts, dance and/or music) while meeting the requirements of their Ontario Secondary School Diploma. SHSM also assists in the transitions to college, apprenticeship, university and the workplace by allowing students to learn hands-on, with creative liberty.

Silverthorn's SHSM program offers a number of customized learning opportunities in the arts, including attending arts focused workshops, visiting post-secondary art institutions, and watching guest speakers, and more.

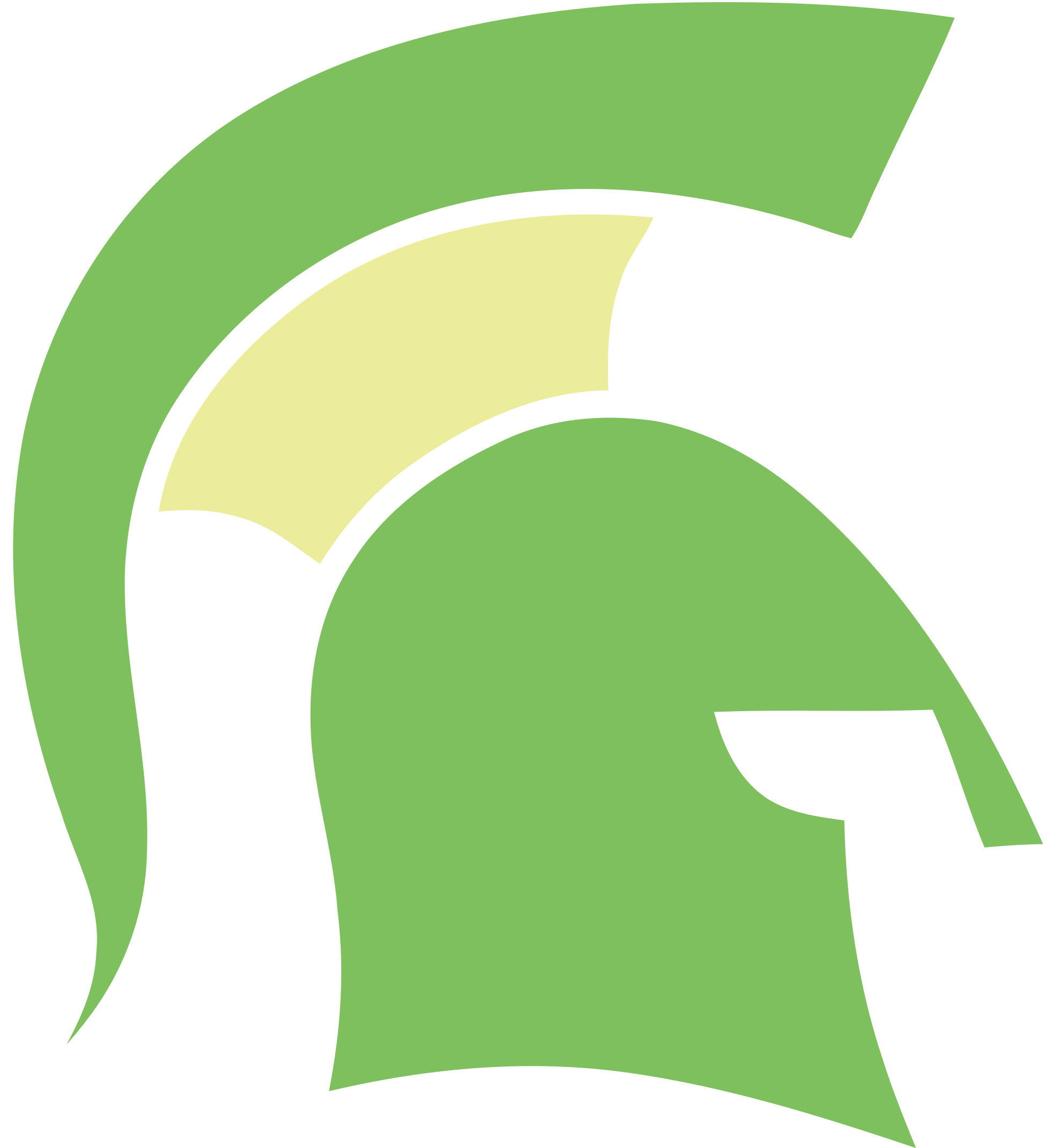
SCI Mascot

Furthermore, students completing the SHSM programme will earn an 'Arts and Culture' designation on their Ontario Secondary School Diploma as recognition of their hard-work and achievement.

== Notable alumni ==
- Will Cuylle, professional hockey player
- Summer McIntosh, Olympic swimmer
- Elfi Schlegel, gymnast and sportscaster
- Kiefer Sutherland, actor
- Estella Warren, actress
- Steve Gilchrist, former Member of Provincial Parliament in Ontario
- Brittany MacLean, freestyle Olympic swimmer
- Verica Bakoc, professional water polo player
- Nikola Kalinic, professional NFL player
- Llevi Noel, professional CFL player
- Mark Robinson (meteorologist), professional storm chaser
- Connor Brown (ice hockey), professional hockey player
- Ethan Czata (ice hockey), professional hockey player
- Andrea Mitrovic, Volleyball player, member of Canada women's national volleyball team.

== See also ==
- Education in Ontario
- List of secondary schools in Ontario
