= Martingrove Collegiate Institute =

High school in Toronto, Canada

Location
- 50 Winterton Drive; Etobicoke, Toronto, Ontario, M9B 3G7; Canada; 43.673406°N 79.560810°W

Information
- School type: High School
- Motto: Latin: Lumen in Vobis Est (The Light is Within You)
- Founded: May 28, 1966
- School board: Toronto District School Board
- Superintendent: Lorraine Linton; FOS02
- Area trustee: Dan MacLean; Ward 2
- School number: 2804
- Principal: Leigh Thornton
- Grades: 9 - 12
- Enrolment: 944 (June 30, 2022)
- Language: English
- Schedule type: Semestered
- Colours: Brown, White and Orange
- Mascot: Bear
- Team name: Martingrove Bears
- Newspaper: The Martingrove Beacon
- Website: sites.google.com/tdsb.on.ca/martingroveci/mci-home

Martingrove Collegiate Institute is a semestered public secondary school in the Etobicoke district of Toronto, Ontario, Canada. It opened in 1966 and is currently overseen by the Toronto District School Board.

== Academics ==
=== Gifted Program ===
Martingrove is currently one of two TDSB designated high schools for the Gifted Program in Etobicoke (the other being Thistletown Collegiate Institute).

=== AP & Pre-AP Program ===
Martingrove offers the Advanced Placement Program and Pre-AP Program to its students. The Pre-AP Program historically ran from Grade 9 through Grade 11, but was limited to Grade 11 in recent years. It is designed to teach students the necessary skills, knowledge, and foundations for success in preparation for the Advanced Placement Program in grade 12. Senior-level AP courses offered as of 2026 include: English Literature, French Language & Culture, Calculus AB/BC, Physics, Biology, Chemistry, and Psychology.

== Extracurricular Activities ==
=== Reach for the Top ===
Martingrove has a history of participation in the high school quiz program Reach for the Top. They have won numerous local, regional and provincial tournaments, with appearances at both the provincial and national level finals. They have qualified for the national level finals for 6 years straight as of 2018.

Notable Victories:

- 2013 - Ontario Provincial Champions
- 2014 - Canadian National Champions
- 2015 - Ontario Provincial Champions
- 2016 - Ontario Provincial Champions

Martingrove has recently abstained from competing in the Reach for the Top circuit, due to budget concerns and controversial price raises on the part of the trivia circuit. In recent years the school has opted to compete in other competitions and circuits, the most notable of which being Consensus Trivia, for which they have gone to nationals all of the past 3 years.

=== Model United Nations ===
Martingrove is host to one of the largest Model United Nations in Ontario, Martingrove Model United Nations, running the annual 2-day event since 1986. The event draws on hundreds of students across the Toronto District School Board, as well as notable guest speakers such as Bob Rae (former Ontario Premier), Allan Rock (former Justice Minister), Jean Chrétien (former Canadian Prime Minister), Lloyd Axworthy (former Foreign Affairs Minister), and Elizabeth Dowdeswell (current Lieutenant Governor of Ontario).

=== School Newspaper ===
Martingrove's student-run news magazine is called The Martingrove Beacon. It was created in 2002 and since then has won 15 Toronto Star high school newspaper awards. Previously (in the late 1980s and early 90s), the newspaper was called The Bear Facts, so named after the school's mascot.

=== Auditorium Facilities Crew ===
Martingrove's Auditorium Facilities Crew (AFC) is a student-run organization that takes care of the school's stage productions, assemblies, and shows, as well as third party permits. They have worked with groups like the Etobicoke Philharmonic Orchestra, hosted a Toronto Mayoral Debate for the 2023 Toronto mayoral by-election with John Campbell, and hosted speeches from notable Toronto figures such as Yvan Baker and Anthony Morgan.

== Notable alumni ==
- Basia Bulat, musician
- Tom Cochrane, musician
- Nathan Cullen, Canadian Federal politician in the New Democratic Party
- Daniel DeSanto, actor (Half Baked, Are You Afraid of the Dark?, Mean Girls, Breakaway)
- Bruce Driver, former NHL Hockey Player and Stanley Cup champion (New Jersey Devils)
- Mark Ellis, co-creator, Executive Producer of Flashpoint and X-Company
- Brad Giffen, former News Anchor/Reporter (ABC, CTV, CITY-TV / Host-Toronto Rocks)
- Ed Iacobucci, dean and Professor of Law, Faculty of Law, University of Toronto
- Heather MacLean, an Olympic Swimmer on the Swim Relay Squad in London, 2012
- Maneesh, producer and DJ
- Denis McGrath, screenwriter and producer
- Frank Morrone, audio engineer, Canadian Screen Award winner for The Book of Negroes, Emmy award winner
- Keith Pelley, sports executive, CEO of the PGA European Tour, former presidents of Rogers Media, Toronto Argonauts and TSN
- Malcolm Subban, NHL goalie for the Buffalo Sabres
- Kiefer Sutherland, actor (24, The Lost Boys, A Time to Kill)
- Claire Thompson, hockey player for the Canadian Women's National Hockey Team, Olympic Gold Medalist
- Ravi Vakil, professor of Mathematics, Stanford University.
- Matthew Wright, basketball Player (Phoenix Fuel Masters, Philippines National Team)
- Lindsay Zier-Vogel, writer and arts educator

== See also ==
- Education in Ontario
- List of secondary schools in Ontario
