= West Humber Collegiate Institute =

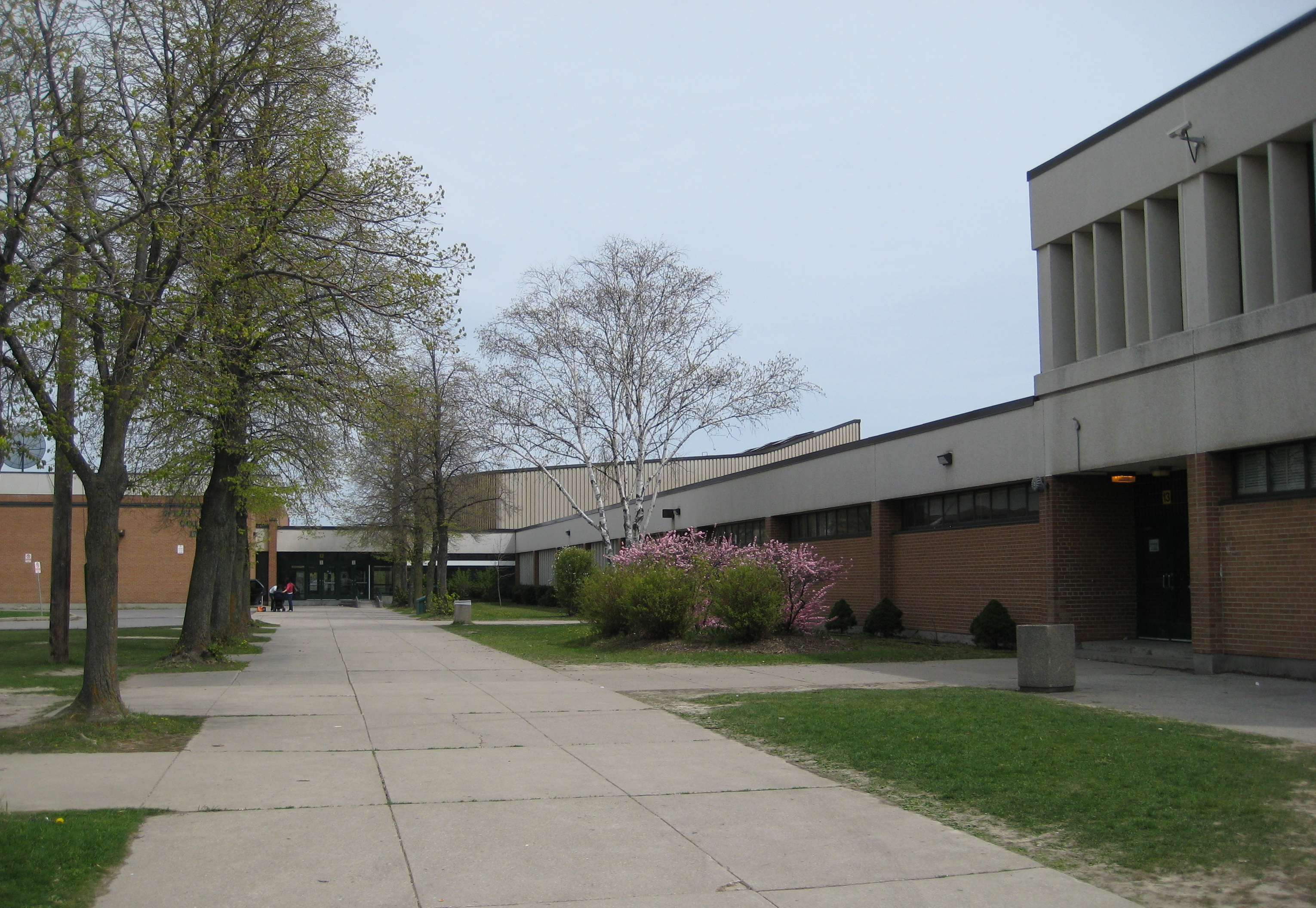

Location
- 1675 Martin Grove Road; Toronto, Ontario, M9V 3S3; Canada; 43°43′51″N 79°35′12″W

Information
- School type: Public, high school
- Motto: Achievement through effort
- Founded: 1966
- School board: Toronto District School Board (Etobicoke Board of Education)
- Superintendent: Ali Jahangir; FOS01
- Area trustee: Dennis Hastings
- Principal: Bernard Lee
- Grades: 9-12
- Enrolment: 1096 (September 30, 2021)
- Language: English
- Schedule type: Semestered
- Colours: Blue & Gold
- Mascot: Viking
- Team name: Vikes
- Website: schoolweb.tdsb.on.ca/whci/
- Last updated: April 17, 2025

West Humber Collegiate Institute (WHCI, West Humber) is a public high school in Toronto, Ontario, Canada. It is situated at the corner of Martin Grove Road and John Garland Blvd., just south of Finch Avenue West in the neighbourhood of Rexdale. Opened in 1966, the institute is owned and operated by the Toronto District School Board. Prior to 1998, it was overseen by the Etobicoke Board of Education.

Since 1998, the school has annually awarded the Pamela M. Prinold Memorial Scholarship to a student who demonstrates community involvement, making a difference in their community, and strength in volunteering and leadership.

== Feeder schools ==
- Albion Heights Junior Middle School
- West Humber Junior Middle School
- Elmbank Junior Middle Academy
- Greenholme Junior Middle School
- Humberwood Downs Junior Middle Academy
- Beaumonde Heights Junior Middle School

== Notable alumni ==
- David Visentin – realtor and television host
- Hodan Nalayeh – media executive and entrepreneur
- Wayne Gretzky – NHL hockey player

== See also ==
- Education in Ontario
- List of secondary schools in Ontario
