= List of schools in the Toronto Catholic District School Board =

The following is a list of schools in the Toronto Catholic District School Board. The Toronto Catholic District School Board governs 196 schools in the Toronto area that makes up 163 elementary schools, 29 secondary schools, 2 schools that combine both elementary and secondary grades, and 2 alternative schools.

== Elementary schools ==
- All Saints
- Annunciation
- Bishop Macdonell
- Blessed Sacrament
- Blessed Trinity
- Canadian Martyrs
- Cardinal Leger
- D'Arcy McGee
- Divine Mercy
- Epiphany of Our Lord
- Father Serra
- Holy Angels
- Holy Child
- Holy Cross
- Holy Family
- Holy Name
- Holy Rosary
- Holy Spirit
- Immaculate Conception
- Immaculate Heart of Mary
- James Culnan
- Josyf Cardinal Slipyj
- Monsignor John Corrigan
- Mother Cabrini
- Our Lady of Fatima
- Our Lady of Grace
- Our Lady of Lourdes
- Our Lady of Peace
- Our Lady of Perpetual Help
- Our Lady of Sorrows
- Our Lady of the Assumption
- Our Lady of Victory
- Our Lady of Wisdom
- Pope Francis
- Precious Blood
- Prince of Peace
- Regina Mundi
- Sacred Heart
- Santa Maria
- St. Agatha
- St. Agnes
- St. Aidan
- St. Albert
- St. Alphonsus
- St. Ambrose
- St. Andre
- St. Andrew
- St. Angela
- St. Anselm
- St. Anthony
- St. Antoine Daniel
- St. Augustine
- St. Barbara
- St. Barnabas
- St. Bartholomew
- St. Bede
- St. Benedict
- St. Bernard
- St. Bonaventure
- St. Boniface
- St. Brendan
- St. Brigid
- St. Bruno / St. Raymond
- St. Catherine
- St. Cecilia
- St. Charles
- St. Charles Garnier
- St. Clare
- St. Clement
- St. Columba
- St. Conrad
- St. Cyril
- St. Demetrius
- St. Denis
- St. Dominic Savio
- St. Dorothy
- St. Dunstan
- St. Edmund Campion
- St. Edward
- St. Elizabeth
- St. Elizabeth Seton
- St. Eugene
- St. Fidelis
- St. Florence
- St. Francis Assisi
- St. Francis de Sales
- St. Francis Xavier
- St. Gabriel
- St. Gabriel Lalemant
- St. Gerald
- St. Gregory
- St. Helen
- St. Henry
- St. Ignatius of Loyola
- St. Isaac Jogues
- St. James
- St. Jane Frances
- St. Jean De Brebeuf
- St. Jerome
- St. Joachim
- St. John
- St. John Bosco
- St. John The Evangelist
- St. John Vianney
- St. John XXIII
- St. Josaphat
- St. Joseph
- St. Jude
- St. Kateri Tekakwitha
- St. Kevin
- St. Lawrence
- St. Leo
- St. Louis
- St. Luigi
- St. Malachy
- St. Marcellus
- St. Margaret
- St. Margherita of Città di Castello
- St. Marguerite Bourgeoys
- St. Maria Goretti
- St. Mark
- St. Martha
- St. Martin de Porres
- St. Mary
- St. Mary of the Angels
- St. Matthew
- St. Maurice
- St. Michael
- St. Monica
- St. Nicholas
- St. Nicholas of Bari
- St. Norbert
- St. Paschal Baylon
- St. Paul
- St. Paul VI
- St. Pier Giorgio Frassati
- St. Pius X
- St. Raphael
- St. Rene Goupil
- St. Richard
- St. Rita
- St. Robert
- St. Roch
- St. Rose Of Lima
- St. Sebastian
- St. Simon
- St. Stephen
- St. Sylvester
- St. Theresa Shrine
- St. Thomas Aquinas
- St. Thomas More
- St. Timothy
- St. Ursula
- St. Victor
- St. Vincent de Paul
- St. Wilfrid
- Stella Maris
- Sts. Cosmas and Damian
- The Divine Infant
- The Holy Trinity
- Transfiguration of Our Lord
- Venerable John Merlini

== Secondary schools ==
- Bishop Allen
- Bishop Marrocco/Thomas Merton
- Brebeuf
- Chaminade
- Dante Alighieri
- Father Henry Carr
- Father John Redmond
- Francis Libermann
- James Cardinal McGuigan
- Loretto
- Loretto Abbey
- Madonna
- Marshall McLuhan
- Mary Ward
- Michael Power/St. Joseph
- Monsignor Percy Johnson
- Neil McNeil
- Notre Dame
- Senator O'Connor
- St. Basil-the-Great
- St. Joan of Arc
- St. John Henry Newman
- St. John Paul II
- St. Joseph's
- St. Joseph's Morrow Park
- St. Mary
- St. Mother Teresa
- St. Oscar Romero
- St. Patrick

== Combined schools ==
- Cardinal Carter
- St. Michael's Choir
- Natvity Of Our Lord Catholic School

== Alternative schools ==
- A.P.P.L.E
- Monsignor Fraser

== Future schools ==
- Baycrest Public School (pending negotiations with the TDSB)
- St. John Henry Newman Catholic High School — 2685 Kingston Road, former Scarboro Missions (opening date to be determined)
- Bridgeport/Lawrence (co-owner with TDSB)
- MacAshpalt (Progress/Sheppard)
- Nelson A. Boylen Collegiate Institute (Actively being demolished)
- Regent Park/Duke of York Public School (demolished)
- Scarlett Heights Entrepreneurial Academy (pending negotiations with the TDSB)

== Former schools ==
Previously the district operated French-language schools in addition to English-language schools. As of May 1980 the district operated five of the seven public French-language schools in Metropolitan Toronto, with the other two being operated by the North York Board of Education. The Metropolitan Separate School Board required any potential student to have at least one French-speaking parent before being admitted to a French-speaking school. One of the francophone schools operated by the board was the Ecole Sacre Coeur, which first opened in 1891 in a building basement and moved to its own facility in 1896. In the year it started, Toronto had 130 francophone families. As of 2026, all French-language public schools in Toronto are operated by the Conseil scolaire Viamonde and the Conseil scolaire catholique MonAvenir.

Meanwhile, the Board operated and funded two schools that they were part of since 1967 namely De La Salle College and St. Michael's College School. The schools, however, were re-privatized in 1985 and 1994 (although De La Salle spent almost 7 years with the board). In addition, three high schools such as Brother Edmund Rice, Marian Academy, and Regina Pacis were run by the Metropolitan Separate School Board. Both schools were closed between 2001 and 2002 due to low enrolment and the facilities were later reused. Also there was a Don Bosco which was also closed in 2017 due to low enrolment and as well was reused.

== See also ==
- List of educational institutions in Etobicoke
- List of educational institutions in Scarborough
- List of schools in the Conseil scolaire catholique MonAvenir
- List of schools in the Conseil scolaire Viamonde
- List of schools in the Toronto District School Board
