= List of educational institutions in Scarborough, Ontario =

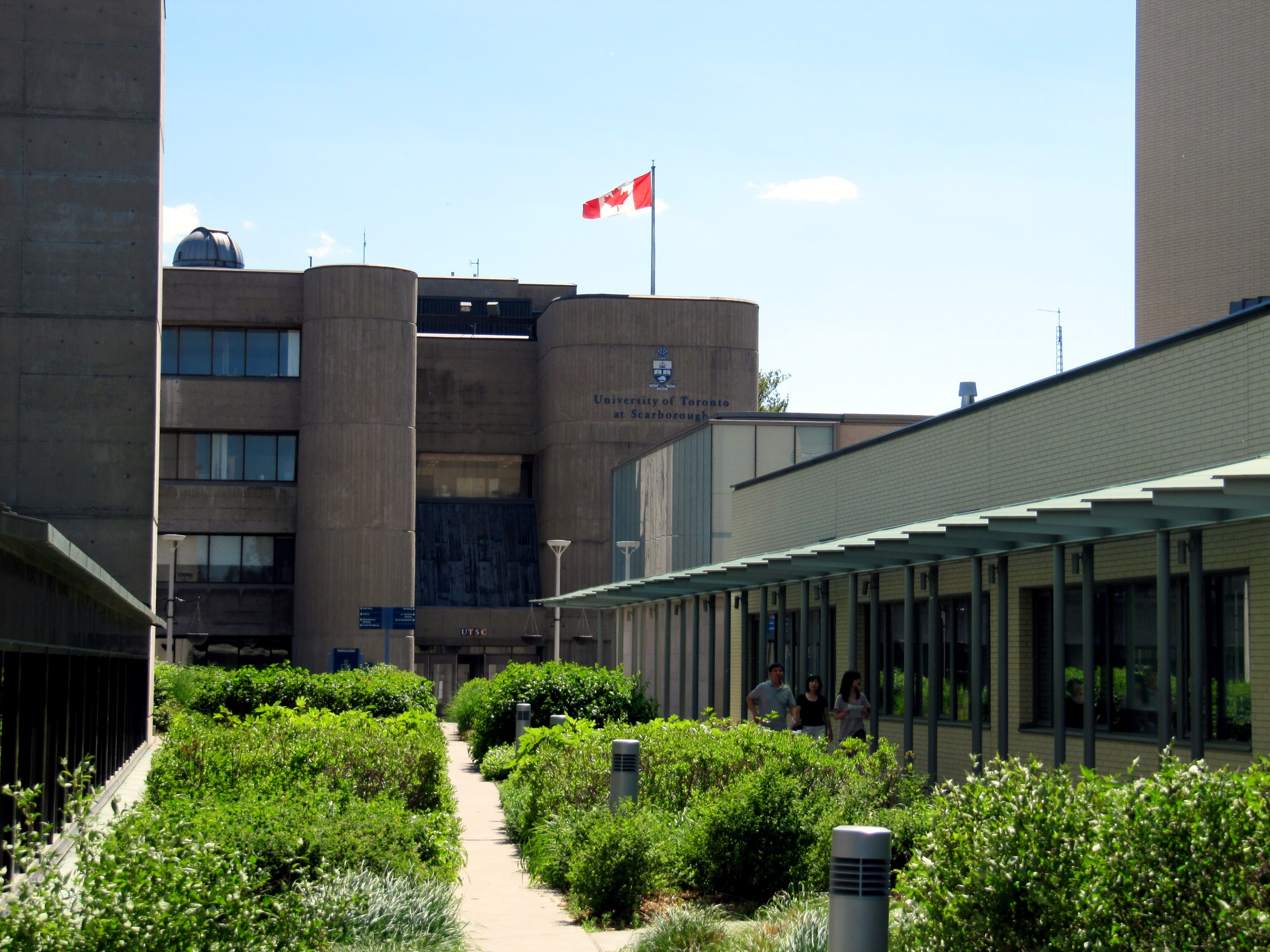
The John Andrews Building on the University of Toronto's Scarborough campus.

The following is a list of educational institutions in the Scarborough district of the city of Toronto, Ontario, Canada. The Toronto school boards provide public elementary and secondary education. The boards operate as either English or French first language school boards, and as either secular or separate school boards. In addition to elementary and secondary schools, Scarborough is also home to two public post-secondary institutions, and several private vocational schools.

== Pre-Amalgamation History ==
Education was important in the settlement of non-Indigenous families in the former Township of Scarborough. After the 1799 settlement of David and Mary Thomson (remembered in a Secondary School just west of their homestead), a schoolhouse was built near David and brother Andrew's farms; Eventually, Thomas Muir, father of Alexander Muir settled in the area to teach early generations of the pioneer families. After establishment as a Township in 1850, school districts were formed, and administration provided locally. Eventually, the former Scarborough Board of Education was established in the growing post World War 2 years. Bonis' "A History of Scarborough" (1963, and revised after 1967 Borough Status) goes into GREAT detail, and will be cited later.

== Post-secondary institutions ==
Scarborough is home to two public post-secondary institutions, the University of Toronto and Centennial College. The University of Toronto Scarborough is one of three campuses of the University of Toronto, which is primarily based in downtown Toronto. Centennial College is a public college that operates several campuses in Scarborough, and other areas of Toronto.

In addition to public post-secondary institutions, Scarborough is home to several private vocational schools, including the Oxford College of Arts, Business and Technology.

== Secondary schools ==
Secondary schools in Scarborough typically offer schooling for students from Grades 9 to 12. Three of the four Toronto-based public school boards operate secondary schools in Scarborough, Conseil scolaire catholique MonAvenir, Toronto Catholic District School Board (TCDSB), and the Toronto District School Board. MonAvenir and TCDSB operate as separate school boards, the former being a French first language school board, the latter being English. TDSB operates as a secular English first language school board. The secular French first language school board, Conseil scolaire Viamonde (CSV) is the only Toronto-based school board that does not operate a secondary school in the district, with CSV secondary students attending secondary schools located in the adjacent districts of North York, or Old Toronto.

In addition to standard secondary schools, TDSB also operate a number of adult schools in Scarborough, including the Gooderham Learning Centre, McGriskin Centre, and the Scarborough Centre for Alternative Studies.

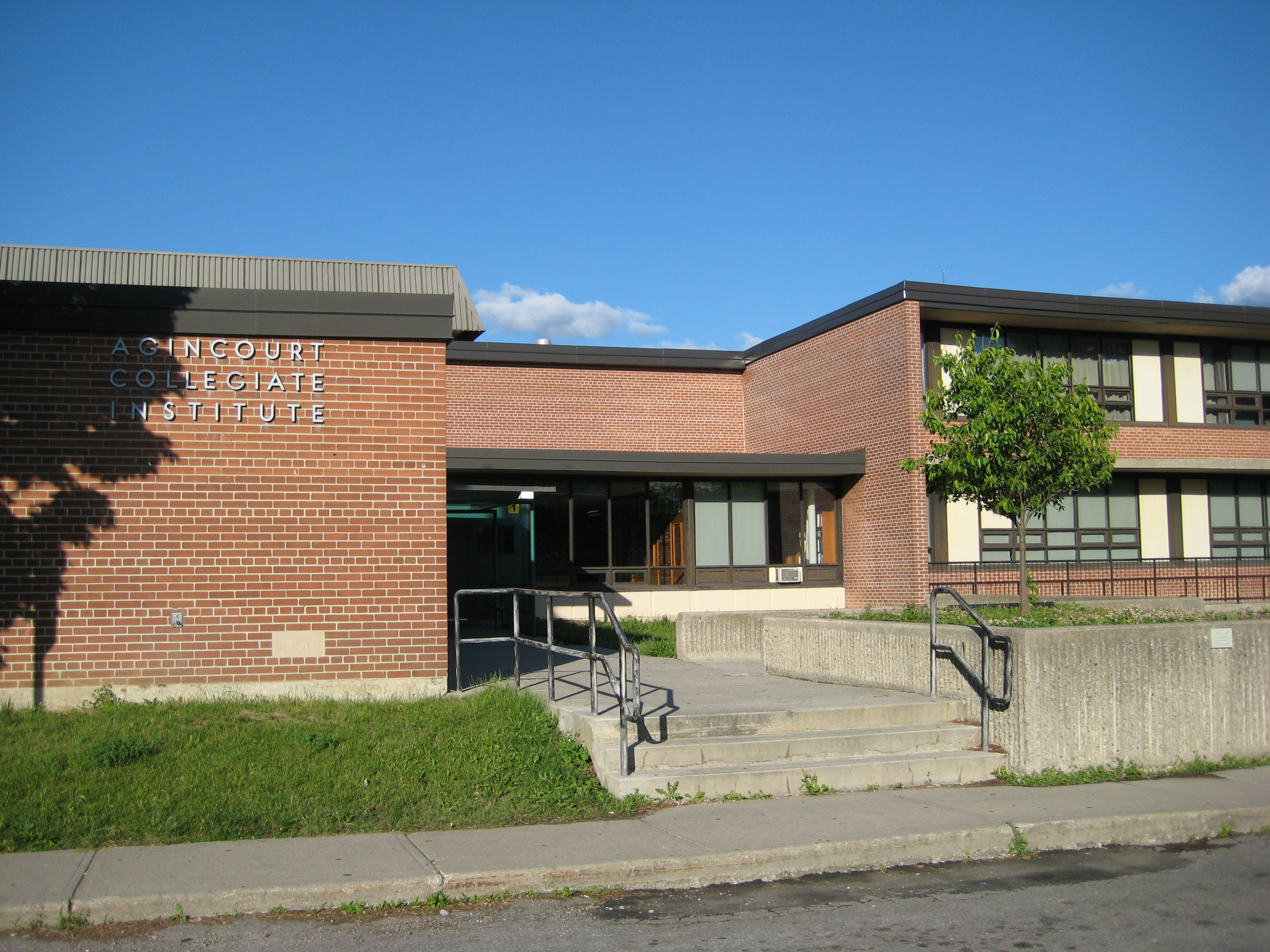
Established in 1915, Agincourt Collegiate Institute is the oldest operating public secondary school in Scarborough (building pictured built in 1952).

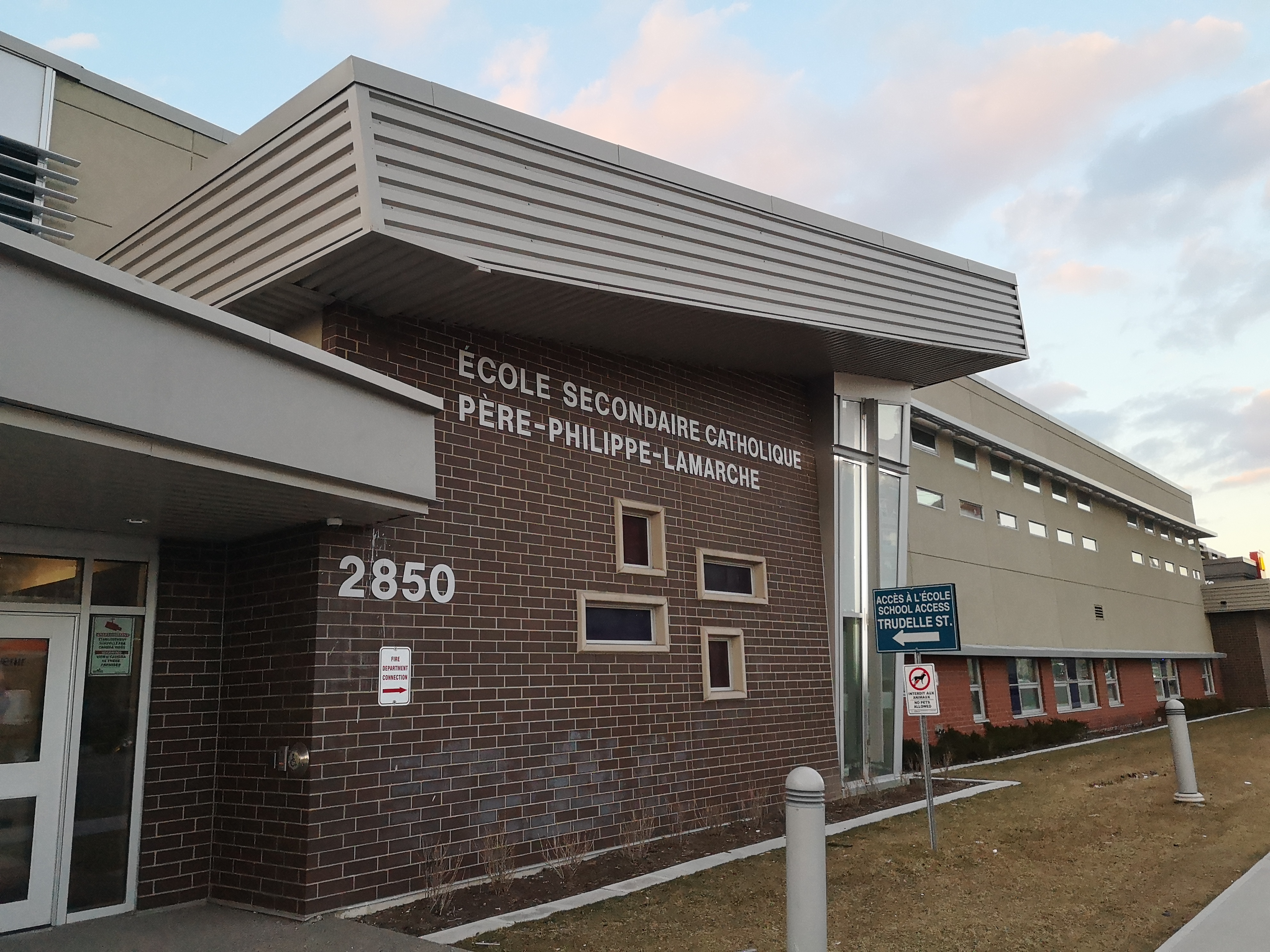
École secondaire catholique Père-Philippe-Lamarche is a public French first language separate secondary school in Eglinton East.

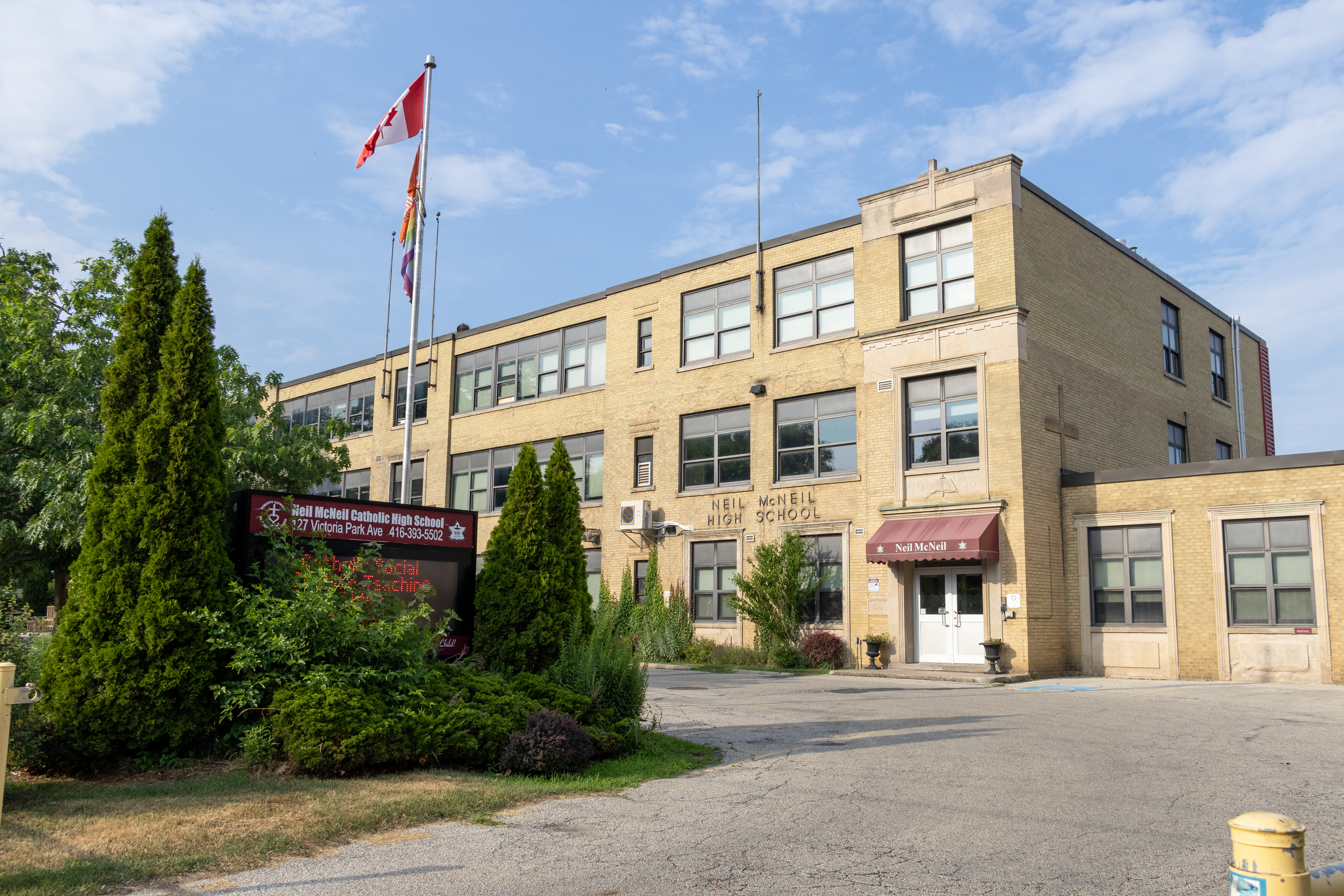
Neil McNeil Catholic High School is an all-boys non-private catholic secondary school located in Birch Cliff.

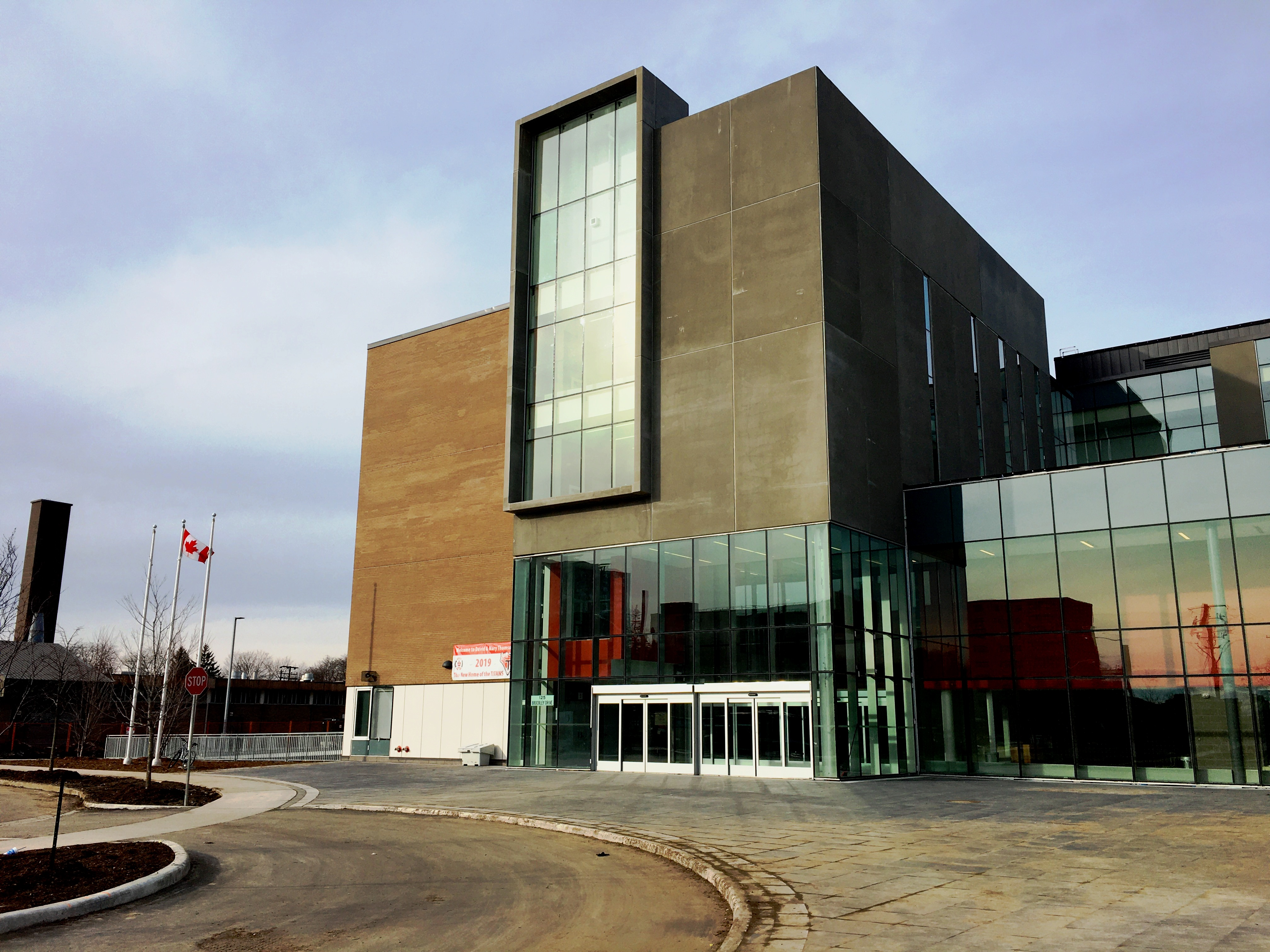
David and Mary Thomson Collegiate Institute is a secondary school established in 1959 in Central Scarborough. This new building replaced the Lawrence building built in 1958 and Bendale Business and Technical Institute built in 1962, with the latter merged into the former school.

The following is a list of public secondary schools in Scarborough,

Name	School board	Year established
Agincourt Collegiate Institute	Toronto District School Board	1915
Albert Campbell Collegiate Institute	Toronto District School Board	1976
Alternate Scarborough Education 1 (Note: The following institution operates as an alternative school.)	Toronto District School Board	1975
Birchmount Park Collegiate Institute	Toronto District School Board	1964
Cedarbrae Collegiate Institute	Toronto District School Board	1961
David and Mary Thomson Collegiate Institute	Toronto District School Board	1959
Delphi Secondary Alternative School	Toronto District School Board	1981
Dr Norman Bethune Collegiate Institute	Toronto District School Board	1979
École secondaire catholique Père-Philippe-Lamarche	Conseil scolaire catholique MonAvenir	2017
Francis Libermann Catholic High School	Toronto Catholic District School Board	1977
L'Amoreaux Collegiate Institute	Toronto District School Board	1973
Lester B. Pearson Collegiate Institute	Toronto District School Board	1978
Maplewood High School (Note: Formerly Maplewood Vocational School.)	Toronto District School Board	1967
Mary Ward Catholic Secondary School	Toronto Catholic District School Board	1985
Monsignor Fraser College (Note: Monsignor Fraser College operates two campuses in one building: Midland and Midland North.)	Toronto Catholic District School Board	1975
Native Learning Centre East (Note: The following institution operates as an alternative secondary school for First Nations, Metis, and Inuit students.)	Toronto District School Board	
Neil McNeil Catholic High School	Toronto Catholic District School Board	1958
Parkview Alternative School	Toronto District School Board	
R. H. King Academy (Note: Formerly Scarborough High School, Scarborough Collegiate Institute and R.H. King Collegiate Institute.)	Toronto District School Board	1922
SATEC @ W. A. Porter Collegiate Institute (Note: Formerly and sometimes known as W. A. Porter Collegiate Institute.)	Toronto District School Board	1958
Scarborough Centre for Alternative Studies	Toronto District School Board	1986
Sir John A. Macdonald Collegiate Institute	Toronto District School Board	1964
Sir Oliver Mowat Collegiate Institute	Toronto District School Board	1970
Sir Wilfrid Laurier Collegiate Institute	Toronto District School Board	1965
Sir William Osler High School (Note: Formerly Sir William Osler Vocational School.)	Toronto District School Board	
South East Year Round Alternative Centre	Toronto District School Board	2005
St. Joan of Arc Catholic Academy (Note: Formerly Jean Vanier Catholic Secondary School.)	Toronto Catholic District School Board	1989
St. John Henry Newman Catholic High School (Note: Formerly Blessed Cardinal Newman Catholic High School.)	Toronto Catholic District School Board	1973
St. John Paul II Catholic Secondary School (Note: Formerly Pope John Paul II Catholic Secondary School and Blessed Pope John Paul II Catholic Secondary School.)	Toronto Catholic District School Board	1983
St. Mother Teresa Catholic Academy (Note: Formerly Mother Teresa Catholic Secondary School and Blessed Mother Teresa Catholic Secondary School.)	Toronto Catholic District School Board	1985
Stephen Leacock Collegiate Institute	Toronto District School Board	1970
West Hill Collegiate Institute	Toronto District School Board	1955
Wexford Collegiate School for the Arts (Note: Formerly Wexford Collegiate Institute.)	Toronto District School Board	1965
Winston Churchill Collegiate Institute	Toronto District School Board	1954
Woburn Collegiate Institute	Toronto District School Board	1963

=== Defunct or holding schools ===
Name	School board	Year established	Year closed	Notes
Bendale Business and Technical Institute (Note: Formerly Bendale Vocational School and Bendale Secondary School.)	Toronto District School Board	1963	2019	Most of its property including the racetrack was replaced by the new David and Mary Thomson Collegiate Institute building, in which Bendale merged with; the balance of both sites now replaced by townhouse developments.
Midland Avenue Collegiate Institute	Toronto District School Board	1962	2000	Building occupied by Scarborough Centre for Alternative Studies
Sir Robert L. Borden Business and Technical Institute (Note: Formerly Sir Robert L. Borden Secondary School.)	Toronto District School Board	1966	2016	
Tabor Park Vocational School	Toronto District School Board	1965	1986	Leased to the TCDSB/MSSB and presently operates as St. Joan of Arc Catholic Academy (formerly Jean Vanier).
Timothy Eaton Business and Technical Institute (Note: Formerly Timothy Eaton Secondary School.)	Toronto District School Board	1971	2009	Demolished and replaced with townhomes.

== Elementary schools ==
All four Toronto-based public school boards operate institutions in Scarborough that provide elementary education. Most elementary schools in Scarborough provides schooling from Junior Kindergarten to Grade 8. However, the TDSB operates several elementary institutions, known as junior public schools, that provide schooling for students from Junior Kindergarten to Grades 5 or 6, as well as senior public schools, which offers schooling for students from Grades 6/7 to 8. TDSB elementary schools that are called public schools typically provide schooling from Junior Kindergarten to Grade 8.

Elementary institutions in Scarborough that are operated by the TCDSB are typically called Catholic schools (although some TCDSB institutions also use the term academy). Elementary schools operated by CSV are named école élémentaire (although one elementary school in Scarborough uses the term académie), whereas schools operated by the MonAvenir are known as école élémentaire catholique.

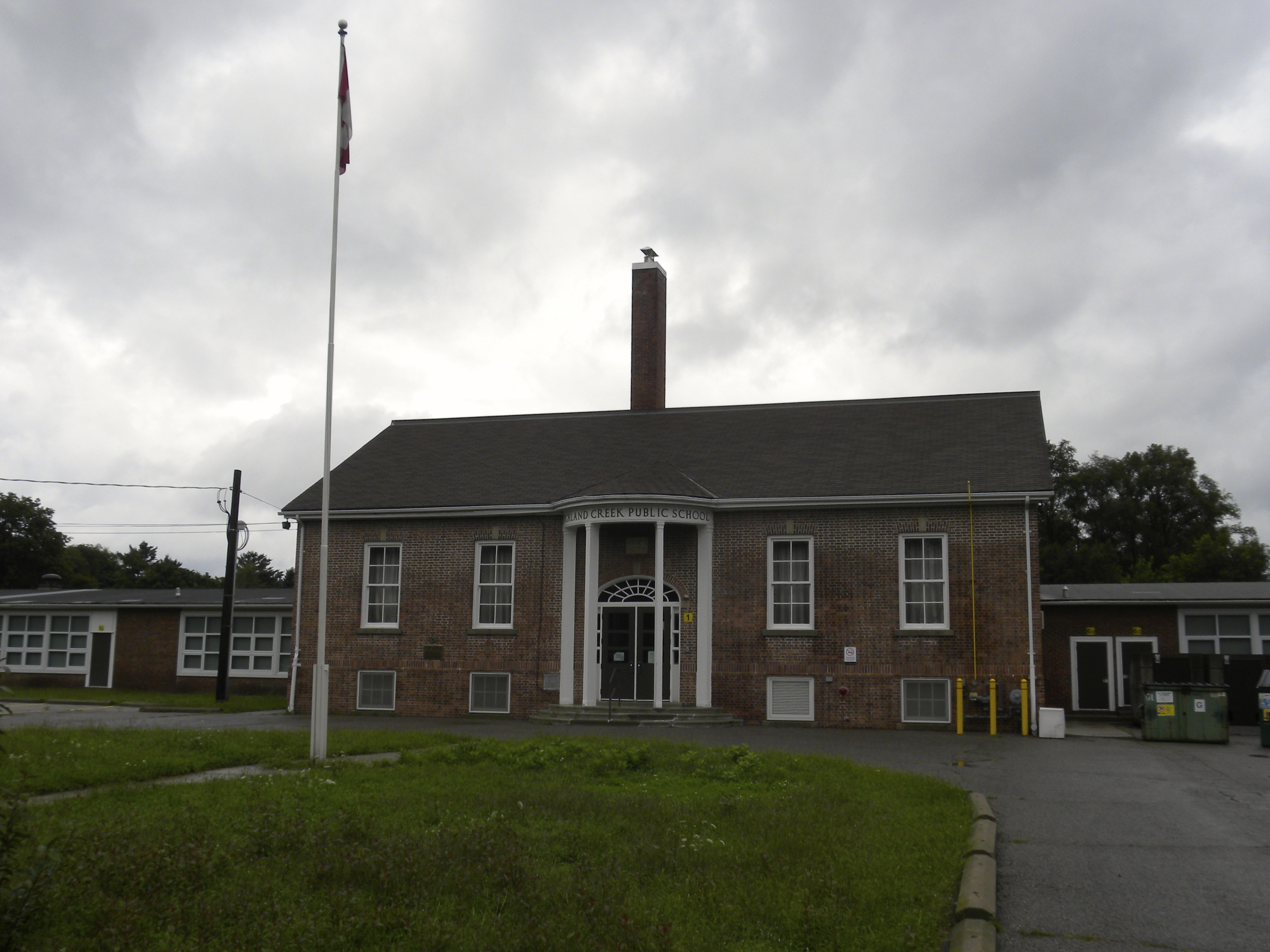
Highland Creek Public School is one of many public elementary schools located in Scarborough.

The following is a list of public elementary schools in Scarborough,

Name	School board	Year established
Académie Alexandre-Dumas	Conseil scolaire Viamonde	
Agnes Macphail Public School	Toronto District School Board	
Alexander Stirling Public School	Toronto District School Board	
Alexmuir Junior Public School	Toronto District School Board	
Alvin Curling Public School	Toronto District School Board	
Anson Park Public School	Toronto District School Board	1959
Anson S Taylor Junior Public School	Toronto District School Board	
Banting & Best Public School	Toronto District School Board	
Bellmere Junior Public School	Toronto District School Board	
Bendale Junior Public School	Toronto District School Board	1957
Bernier Trail Junior Public School	Toronto District School Board	
Beverly Glen Junior Public School	Toronto District School Board	
Birch Cliff Public School	Toronto District School Board	
Birch Cliff Heights Public School	Toronto District School Board	1922
Blantyre Public School	Toronto District School Board	
Bliss Carman Senior Public School	Toronto District School Board	1973
Bridlewood Junior Public School	Toronto District School Board	
Brimwood Boulevard Junior Public School	Toronto District School Board	
Brookmill Boulevard Junior Public School	Toronto District School Board	
Brookside Public School	Toronto District School Board	
Buchanan Public School	Toronto District School Board	1954
Burrows Hills Junior Public School	Toronto District School Board	
Cardinal Léger Catholic School	Toronto Catholic District School Board	1989
C D Farquharson Junior Public School	Toronto District School Board	
Cedar Drive Junior Public School	Toronto District School Board	1970
Cedarbrook Public School	Toronto District School Board	1958
Centennial Road Junior Public School	Toronto District School Board	
Charles Gordon Senior Public School	Toronto District School Board	1970
Chartland Junior Public School	Toronto District School Board	
Charlottetown Junior Public School	Toronto District School Board	
Chester Le Junior Public School	Toronto District School Board	
Chief Dan George Public School	Toronto District School Board	
Chine Drive Public School	Toronto District School Board	
Churchill Heights Public School	Toronto District School Board	
Clairlea Public School	Toronto District School Board	
Cliffside Public School	Toronto District School Board	
Cornell Junior Public School	Toronto District School Board	
Corvette Junior Public School	Toronto District School Board	
Courcelette Public School	Toronto District School Board	
Danforth Gardens Public School	Toronto District School Board	
David Lewis Public School	Toronto District School Board	
Donwood Park Public School (Note: Previously known as Donwood Park Junior Public School.)	Toronto District School Board	1970
Dorset Park Public School	Toronto District School Board	
Dr Marion Hilliard Senior Public School	Toronto District School Board	
Eastview Public School	Toronto District School Board	
École élémentaire catholique Saint-Jean-de-Lalande	Conseil scolaire catholique MonAvenir	1976
École élémentaire catholique Saint-Michel	Conseil scolaire catholique MonAvenir	
École élémentaire Laure-Rièse	Conseil scolaire Viamonde	
Edgewood Public School	Toronto District School Board	
Elizabeth Simcoe Junior Public School	Toronto District School Board	
Ellesmere Station Public School	Toronto District School Board	
Emily Carr Public School	Toronto District School Board	
Epiphany of Our Lord Catholic Academy (Note: Formerly St. Cyprian Catholic School.)	Toronto Catholic District School Board	1975
Fairglen Junior Public School	Toronto District School Board	
Fairmount Public School	Toronto District School Board	
Fleming Public School	Toronto District School Board	
Galloway Road Public School	Toronto District School Board	
General Brock Public School	Toronto District School Board	
General Crerar Public School	Toronto District School Board	
George B Little Public School	Toronto District School Board	
George P Mackie Junior Public School	Toronto District School Board	
George Peck Public School	Toronto District School Board	
Glamorgan Junior Public School	Toronto District School Board	
Glen Ravine Junior Public School	Toronto District School Board	
Golf Road Junior Public School	Toronto District School Board	
Grey Owl Junior Public School	Toronto District School Board	
Guildwood Junior Public School	Toronto District School Board	
H A Halibert Junior Public School	Toronto District School Board	
Heather Heights Junior Public School/Ben Heppner Vocal Music Academy	Toronto District School Board	
Henry Kelsey Senior Public School	Toronto District School Board	
Heritage Park Public School	Toronto District School Board	
Highland Heights Junior Public School/Jean Augustine Girls Leadership Academy	Toronto District School Board	
Holy Spirit Catholic School	Toronto Catholic District School Board	1961
Hunter Glen Junior Public School	Toronto District School Board	
Henry Hudson Senior Public School	Toronto District School Board	
Highcastle Public School	Toronto District School Board	
Highland Creek Public School	Toronto District School Board	
Immaculate Heart of Mary Catholic School	Toronto Catholic District School Board	
Inglewood Heights Junior Public School	Toronto District School Board	
Ionview Public School	Toronto District School Board	
Iroquois Junior Public School	Toronto District School Board	
Jack Miner Senior Public School	Toronto District School Board	
J B Tyrell Senior Public School	Toronto District School Board	
J G Workman Public School	Toronto District School Board	1949
John A Leslie Public School, (renamed in 1950s from Midland Avenue Elementary School)	Toronto District School Board	1922
John Buchan Senior Public School	Toronto District School Board	
John G Diefenbaker Public School	Toronto District School Board	
John McCrae Public School (Note: Formerly John McCrae Senior Public School.)	Toronto District School Board	1969
Joseph Brant Public School (Note: Formerly Joseph Brant Senior Public School.)	Toronto District School Board	1969
Joseph Howe Senior Public School	Toronto District School Board	
Kennedy Public School	Toronto District School Board	
Knob Hill Public School	Toronto District School Board	1956
Lord Roberts Junior Public School	Toronto District School Board	
Lucy Maud Montgomery Public School	Toronto District School Board	
Lynngate Junior Public School	Toronto District School Board	
Lynnwood Heights Junior Public School	Toronto District School Board	
Macklin Public School	Toronto District School Board	
Malvern Junior Public School	Toronto District School Board	
Manhattan Park Junior Public School	Toronto District School Board	
Mary Shadd Public School	Toronto District School Board	
Maryvale Public School	Toronto District School Board	1954
Mason Road Junior Public School	Toronto District School Board	1957
Meadowvale Public School	Toronto District School Board	
Military Trail Public School	Toronto District School Board	
Milliken Public School	Toronto District School Board	
Morrish Public School	Toronto District School Board	
Norman Cook Junior Public School	Toronto District School Board	
North Agincourt Junior Public School	Toronto District School Board	
North Bendale Junior Public School	Toronto District School Board	1960
North Bridlewood Junior Public School	Toronto District School Board	
Oakridge Junior Public School	Toronto District School Board	
Our Lady of Grace Catholic School	Toronto Catholic District School Board	
Our Lady of Fatima Catholic School	Toronto Catholic District School Board	
Our Lady of Wisdom Catholic School	Toronto Catholic District School Board	
Pauline Johnson Junior Public School	Toronto District School Board	
Percy Williams Junior Public School	Toronto District School Board	
Poplar Road Junior Public School	Toronto District School Board	
Port Royal Public School	Toronto District School Board	
Precious Blood Catholic School (Note: Opened in 1950 as St. Teresa Catholic School, Wexford.)	Toronto Catholic District School Board	1950
Prince of Peace Catholic School	Toronto Catholic District School Board	
Regent Heights Public School	Toronto District School Board	
Robert Service Senior Public School	Toronto District School Board	
Rouge Valley Public School	Toronto District School Board	
Sacred Heart Catholic School	Toronto Catholic District School Board	
Samuel Hearne Middle School	Toronto District School Board	
Scarborough Village Public School (Note: Previously known as Scarborough Village Senior Public School.)	Toronto District School Board	1861
Silver Springs Public School	Toronto District School Board	1975
Sir Alexander MacKenzie Senior Public School	Toronto District School Board	
Sir Ernest MacMillan Senior Public School	Toronto District School Board	
Sir Samuel B Steele Junior Public School	Toronto District School Board	
St Aidan Catholic School	Toronto Catholic District School Board	
St Agatha Catholic School	Toronto Catholic District School Board	1964
St Albert Catholic School	Toronto Catholic District School Board	
St Andrews Public School	Toronto District School Board	
St Barbara Catholic School	Toronto Catholic District School Board	1959
St Barnabas Catholic School	Toronto Catholic District School Board	
St Bartholomew Catholic School	Toronto Catholic District School Board	
St Bede Catholic School	Toronto Catholic District School Board	
St Boniface Catholic School	Toronto Catholic District School Board	
St Brendan Catholic School	Toronto Catholic District School Board	
St Columba Catholic School	Toronto Catholic District School Board	
St Dominic Savio Catholic School	Toronto Catholic District School Board	1999
St Dunstan Catholic School	Toronto Catholic District School Board	
St Edmund Campion Catholic School	Toronto Catholic District School Board	
St Elizabeth Seton Catholic School	Toronto Catholic District School Board	
St Florence Catholic School	Toronto Catholic District School Board	
St Gabriel Lalemant Catholic School	Toronto Catholic District School Board	
St Henry Catholic School	Toronto Catholic District School Board	
St Ignatius of Loyola Catholic School	Toronto Catholic District School Board	
St Jean De Brebeuf Catholic School	Toronto Catholic District School Board	
St Jaochim Catholic School	Toronto Catholic District School Board	
St Kevin Catholic School	Toronto Catholic District School Board	
St Lawrence Catholic School	Toronto Catholic District School Board	1956
St Malachy Catholic School	Toronto Catholic District School Board	
St Margaret Public School	Toronto District School Board	
St Marguerite Bourgeoys Catholic School	Toronto Catholic District School Board	
St Maria Goretti Catholic School	Toronto Catholic District School Board	1955
St Martin de Porres Catholic School	Toronto Catholic District School Board	1964
St Nicholas Catholic School	Toronto Catholic District School Board	1965
St. Pier Giorgio Frassati Catholic School	Toronto Catholic District School Board	2013
St Rene Goupil Catholic School	Toronto Catholic District School Board	
St Richard Catholic School	Toronto Catholic District School Board	1964
St Rose Of Lima Catholic School	Toronto Catholic District School Board	1957
St Sylvester Catholic School	Toronto Catholic District School Board	
St Theresa Shrine Catholic School	Toronto Catholic District School Board	1952
St Thomas More Catholic School	Toronto Catholic District School Board	1968
St Ursula Catholic School	Toronto Catholic District School Board	
St Victor Catholic School	Toronto Catholic District School Board	1970
Tam O'Shanter Junior Public School	Toronto District School Board	
Taylor Creek Public School (Note: Formerly Warden Woods Public School.)	Toronto District School Board	1952
Tecumseh Senior Public School	Toronto District School Board	1968
Terraview-Willowfield Public School (Note: The school is a merger of two schools: Terraview Heights Public School and Willowfield Gardens Public School, with the latter opened in 1958.)	Toronto District School Board	
Terry Fox Public School	Toronto District School Board	
The Divine Infant Catholic School	Toronto Catholic District School Board	
Thomas L Wells Public School	Toronto District School Board	
Timberbank Junior Public School	Toronto District School Board	
Tom Longboat Junior Public School	Toronto District School Board	
Tredway Woodsworth Public School (Note: The school is a merger of two schools: William Tredway Junior Public School opened in 1956 and J.S. Woodsworth Senior Public School opened in 1968.)	Toronto District School Board	
Vradenburg Junior Public School	Toronto District School Board	
Walter Perry Junior Public School	Toronto District School Board	
West Hill Public School	Toronto District School Board	1919
West Rouge Junior Public School	Toronto District School Board	
White Haven Public School	Toronto District School Board	
William G Davis Junior Public School	Toronto District School Board	1970s (built by former Ontario County Board of Education)
William G Miller Public School	Toronto District School Board	
Willow Park Junior Public School	Toronto District School Board	
Woburn Junior Public School	Toronto District School Board	1800s

=== Defunct or holding schools ===
Name	School board	Year established	Year closed	Notes
Highbrook Senior Public School	Toronto District School Board	1967	198?	Building used for Donwood Park students in grades 5 to 8.
Hillside Public School.	built as S.S. # 4, Toronto District School Board	1904 (replacing buildings of 1851 and 1872)	1975	Now Hillside Outdoor Education Centre.
McCowan Road Junior Public School	Toronto District School Board	1954	2011	
Our Lady of Good Counsel Catholic School	Toronto Catholic District School Board	1971	2000	Building occupied by Monsignor Fraser College
Pringdale Gardens Junior Public School (Note: Formerly Pringdale Gardens Public School.)	Toronto District School Board	1963	2013	Demolished and replaced with townhomes
St John Fisher Catholic School	Toronto Catholic District School Board	1973	2000	Presently houses Mary Ward LINC program
St Maxillian Kolbe Catholic School	Toronto Catholic District School Board	1984	2011	

== See also ==
- Education in Toronto
- List of educational institutions in Etobicoke
- List of schools of the Conseil scolaire Viamonde
- List of schools of the Conseil scolaire catholique MonAvenir
- List of schools in the Toronto Catholic District School Board
- List of schools in the Toronto District School Board
