= TDCAA =

TDCAA may refer to:

- Texas District and County Attorneys Association, a non-profit based in Austin, Texas
- Toronto District College Athletic Association, a member of the Ontario Federation of School Athletic Associations
