= Monsignor Percy Johnson Catholic High School =

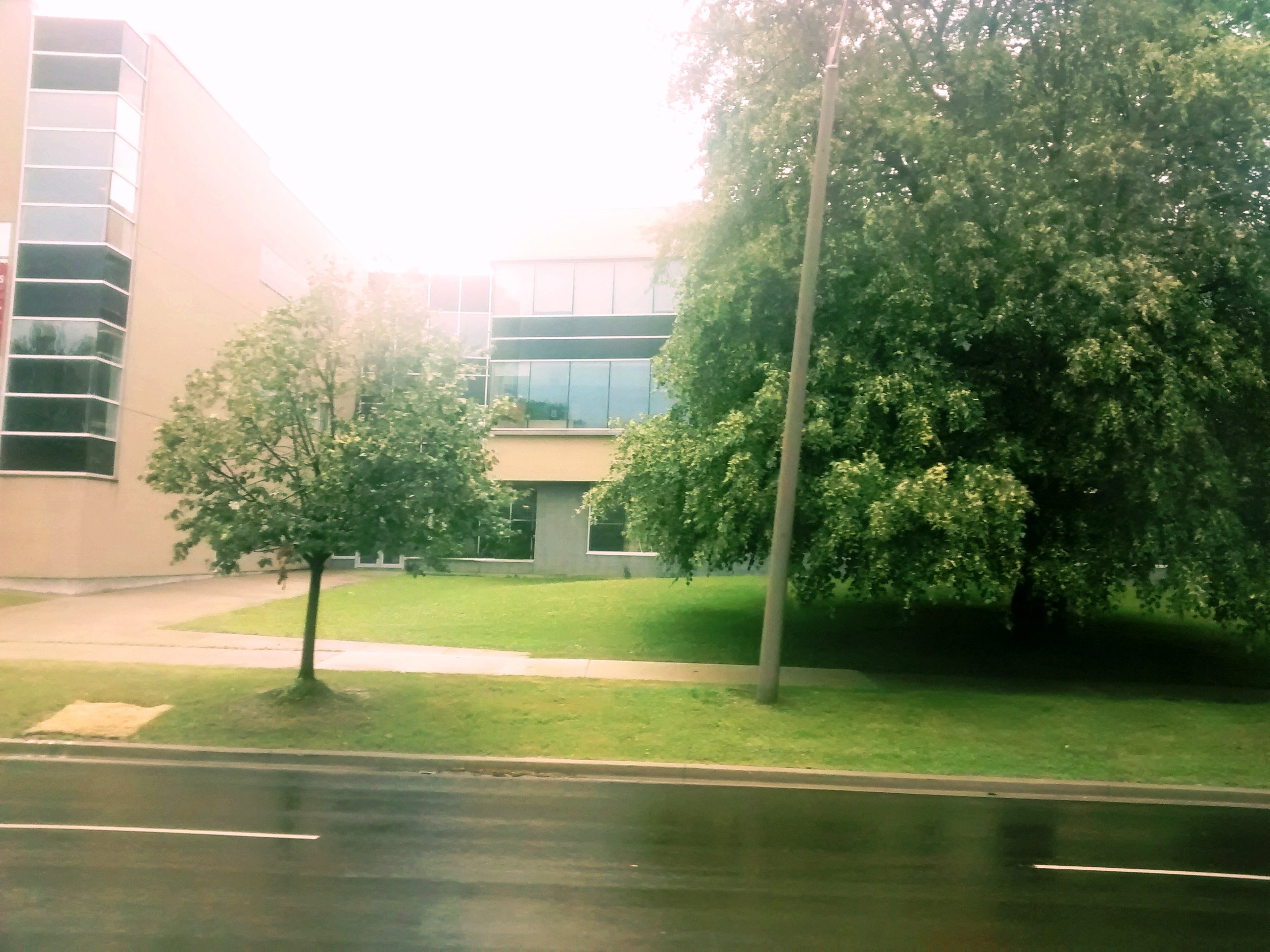

Location
- 2170 Kipling Avenue; Toronto, Ontario, M9W 4K9; Canada; 43.721066°N 79.571171°W

Information
- Former name: Heatherbrae Middle School (1959–1985)
- Motto: Heart Speaks To Heart
- Founded: 1984
- School board: Toronto Catholic District School Board (Metropolitan Separate School Board)
- Superintendent: Flora Cifelli; Area 1
- Area trustee: Joseph Martino; Ward 1
- School number: 535 / 732443
- Principal: Christine Kim
- CSPC Chairs (2019–20): Eunice Rodrigues
- Grades: 9-12
- Enrolment: 978 (2017-18)
- Colors: Red and Black
- Athletics conference: Toronto District Colleges Athletic Association (TDCAA)
- Mascot: Jaguar
- Team name: Johnson Jaguars
- Parish: St. Benedict
- Specialist High Skills Major: Business; Health and Wellness
- Website: www.tcdsb.org/o/msgrpercyjohnson

Monsignor Percy Johnson Catholic Secondary School (Monsignor Percy Johnson CSS, MPJCSS, MPJ or Johnson) is a Roman Catholic high school in the city of Toronto, Ontario, Canada part of the Toronto Catholic District School Board. It is located in the neighbourhood of Rexdale, in the former suburb of Etobicoke.

The school was opened in 1984 at the former Rexdale Junior School before moving to the Heatherbrae Middle School in 1986. It is located next to St. Benedict Roman Catholic Church and Catholic School and was named after Percy Johnson (September 22, 1912 – December 22, 1983), a Catholic priest and member of the former Metropolitan Separate School Board. . The motto of the school is Heart Speaks to Heart.

== History ==
The origins of the school began in November 1983 when Metropolitan Separate School Board (the forerunner to the Toronto Catholic District School Board) and the Archdiocese of Toronto jointly launched a new secondary school to serve northern Etobicoke. With overcrowding at Father Henry Carr, Don Bosco and St. Basil, the MSSB recommended in a February 1984 meeting that the name, Monsignor Percy Johnson, be adopted.

On September 4, 1984, the new Monsignor Percy Johnson school was opened in the facilities of the former Rexdale Junior School. Two years later, the school moved into the former Heatherbrae Middle School on Kipling Avenue, built in 1959, which was closed by the Etobicoke Board of Education in June 1985.

Throughout its early years Johnson had classes inside a middle school which had features in Etobicoke board standards that Toronto Catholic high schools did not have such as the gymnatorium, cafeteria, and a field of portable classrooms. Due to the size of the gym, home games were relocated elsewhere.

In 2004, the TCDSB purchased Heatherbrae from the Toronto District School Board. The old Heatherbrae school was demolished in 2005 and the replacement Johnson building was reconstructed until its completion in 2007, in which the new school opened for classes on September 4 that year. During construction, the student body was relocated to Regina Pacis on Finch and Highway 400. It was officially opened and blessed on May 16, 2008. The new school was designed by ZAS Architects and built by Aquicon Construction and includes a three-storey building with a six-lane track and full-sized sports field. Since then, Johnson is home to over 1000 students serving northern Etobicoke and northwestern North York with ethnic groups ranging from Blacks, Filipinos, Hispanics, Poles, Croatians, Arabs and South Asians.

== Academics ==
Johnson offers various academic programs and courses ranging from French, English, mathematics, science, geography and technological education.

== Athletics and extra-curricular activities ==
The school team, known as the Jaguars, offers intramurals, cross country, basketball, volleyball, track, hockey, soccer, badminton, and softball.

It also offers participation in various memberships in clubs such as Student Council, Yearbook, Empowering Student Partnerships and many others. The English and Drama Departments organize selected theatre trips once in a while.

== See also ==
- Education in Ontario
- List of secondary schools in Ontario
