= Monsignor Fraser College =

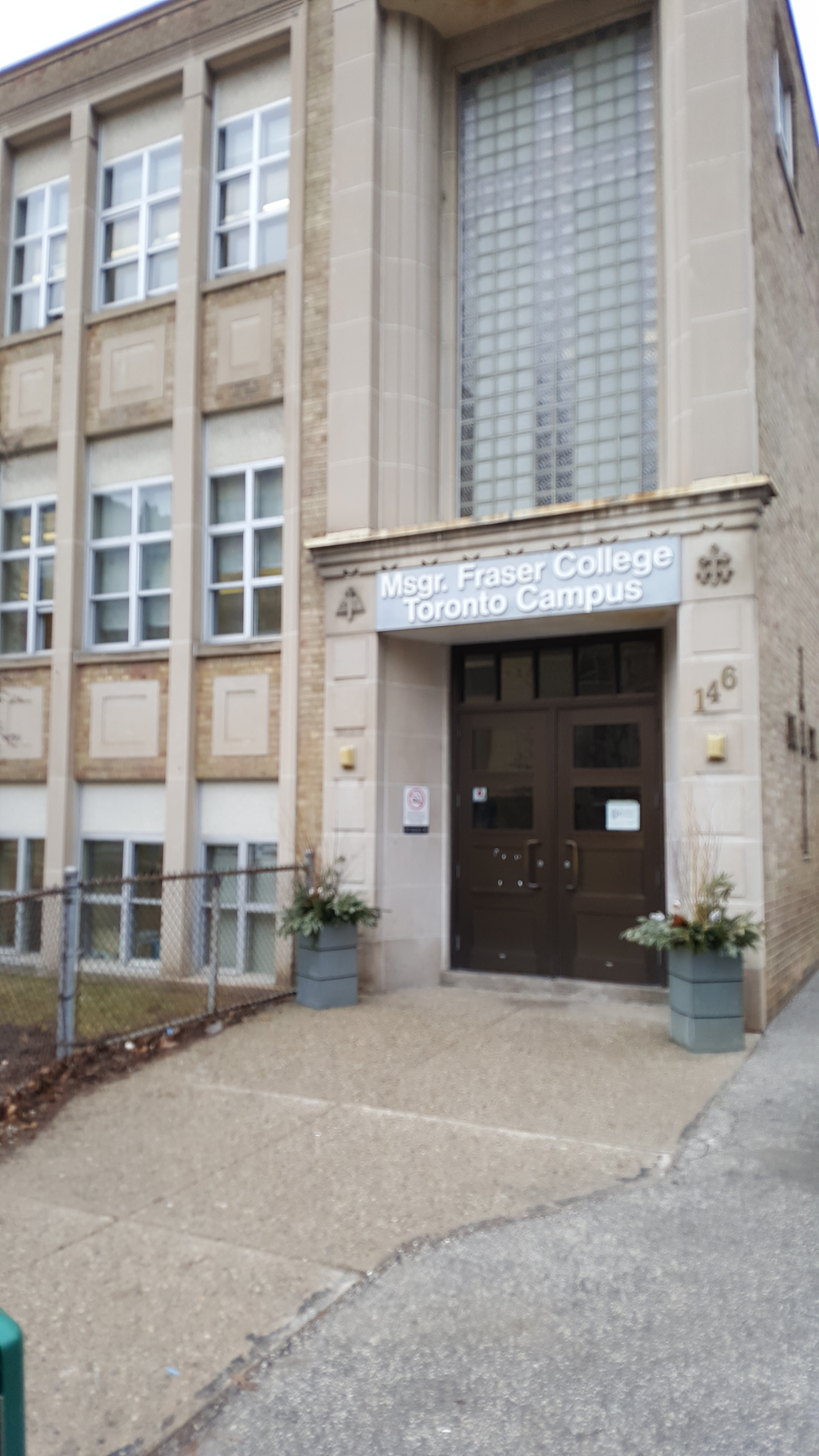
- Isabella Campus

Location
- 146 Isabella Street; Cabbagetown, Toronto, Ontario, M4Y 1P6; Canada; 43.6698°N 79.3768°W

Information
- School type: Catholic Alternative High School; Catholic Adult High School
- Religious affiliation: Catholic
- Founded: 1975
- School board: Toronto Catholic District School Board (Metropolitan Separate School Board)
- Superintendent: Gina Iuliano Marrello; Student Success School Support Initiative
- Area trustee: Norm Di Pasquale; Ward 9
- School number: 533 / 680362 (Isabella); Other campuses: 532 / 733474 (Annex); 532 / 681500 (Midland); 496 / 681500 (Midland North); 558 / 927830 (Norfinch); 500 / 733490 (Orientation Centre)
- Principal: Michael Alexander
- Vice Principal: Anna Sersanti (Midland); Katharine Gainor-Sanajko (Isabella/Annex); Pedro Rodrigues (Norfinch)
- Grades: 9–12
- Enrolment: 1,000 (2022–2023)
- Language: English
- Colours: Burgundy and Silver
- Parish: Our Lady of Lourdes
- Website: www.tcdsb.org/o/msgrfrasercollege

Monsignor Fraser College (also called Monsignor Fraser, MFC, or Fraser) is a Roman Catholic specialized dual-track public Catholic Alternative and Adult Secondary School run by the Toronto Catholic District School Board in Toronto, Ontario, Canada. The school was founded in 1975 by the Metropolitan Separate School Board and was named in honour of John Andrew Mary Fraser (1887 – September 3, 1962), the founder of the Scarborough Foreign Mission Society and a missionary.

After Fraser became a secondary school in 1986, Msgr. Fraser College offers high school credits to three distinct age groups: 16–18 through the Alternative Program, 18–20 in the Adult Day School Program, and Over 21 through the Continuing Education Program. There are four main campuses throughout the city with an additional two dedicated to SAL (Supervised Alternative Learning) programs. Msgr. Fraser also offers a Transition To Work (T2W) Program for disabled students aged 18–20.

== History ==
The Metropolitan Separate School Board recommended and approved the establishment of Monsignor Fraser College in 1975, in conjunction with Metropolitan Social Services, as a means of responding to the growing need for adult education programs for the Metro Toronto adult population. The school originated in the Albert Campbell Library with four pupils before moving to the Scarborough Foreign Mission Society.

As the school program have expanded, physically and intellectually challenged adults were added. A variety of MSSB departments claimed ownership of the program including elementary, continuing education and special curriculum. Students meeting grade 8 standard, began to ask for secondary school credits. These were granted in collaboration with Cardinal Newman. Senior level credits from grades 11 to 13 were finally needed and after the province completed full funding to Catholic high schools, the Board designated Fraser as secondary school in 1986. The first graduates have emerged in 1988.

From Scarborough beginnings, the school added Toronto campus in 1977, Malvern in 1982, North York in 1984, Parkdale in 1986, ESL Orientation Centre in 1988, La Salle (Alternative) in 1993, Curzon (Alternative) in 1994, and in 1994 merged the two small west end campuses, Parkdale and North York into Islington Campus. The Scarborough and Malvern campuses were combined in 2000. The Islington Campus eventually became the Norfinch Campus in 2007.

Today, Monsignor Fraser College is a quadmestered Catholic Secondary School that admits adolescents and adults of all faiths who wish to complete their Ontario Secondary School Diploma or Certificate, study English as a Second Language within a Diploma program, or upgrade work skills. Organized with campuses in different parts of the city, the school provides an educational environment.

=== Monsignor John M. Fraser ===
Monsignor Fraser College is named in honour of the founder of the Scarborough Foreign Mission Society. Monsignor Fraser was born in Toronto but spent most of his younger years as a missionary outside of Canada. In 1918, he returned to Canada with the firm intention of establishing a foreign mission seminary. Archbishop Gauthier of Ottawa approved the foundation of China Mission College at Almonte, Ontario, and the institution received the blessing and support of many of the Canadian hierarchy.

At Almonte, Father Fraser gathered about him, as did Christ Himself, twelve young apostles. In October 1919, CHINA, the mission monthly publication, made its appearance.

At the suggestion of Archbishop McNeil, property was acquired in Scarborough and the senior students were transferred to this new house. Father Fraser joined them soon after. In 1924, St. Francis Xavier, China Mission Seminary was formally blessed and opened on the Scarborough Bluffs in Ontario. The following year, Father Fraser headed the first departure group to the district of Lishui in Southern Chekiang, China.

Monsignor Fraser was noted for his drive for establishing the Kingdom of God and for his ready adaptability to new paths when familiar ones were cut off.

== Programs ==
=== 16–18 Program ===
Developed to meet the needs of students who are experiencing difficulty achieving success at their present high school, this program offers students:

- A small, personalized environment
- An individualized program which meets students' unique learning styles
- The opportunity to accumulate credits towards the completion of secondary school
- The ability to accelerate study in order to complete diploma requirements sooner than in a traditional school setting

=== 18–20 Program ===
Developed for students 18–20 years of age who wish to complete their secondary education in an adult education environment. This program offers students:

- The opportunity to earn 2 full credits every 9 weeks (8 credits per year)
- A variety of multi-level course offerings
- 4 Entry points annually
- A flexible learning environment

=== 21+ Program ===
This program is designed for adults over the age of 21 who still need to complete their secondary education or new Canadians who are seeking an Ontario Secondary School Diploma or Certificate, knowledge of the English language and/or a gateway to either the workplace or post-secondary school education.

=== Transition to Work Co-Operative Education Program (T2W) ===
This program provides an opportunity for students with specific identified needs to explore the workplace with the assistance of job coaches and educational assistants. Students are prepared for the transition to the world of work and if required, to supported independent living.

== Campuses ==
An overview of the campus buildings of Monsignor Fraser
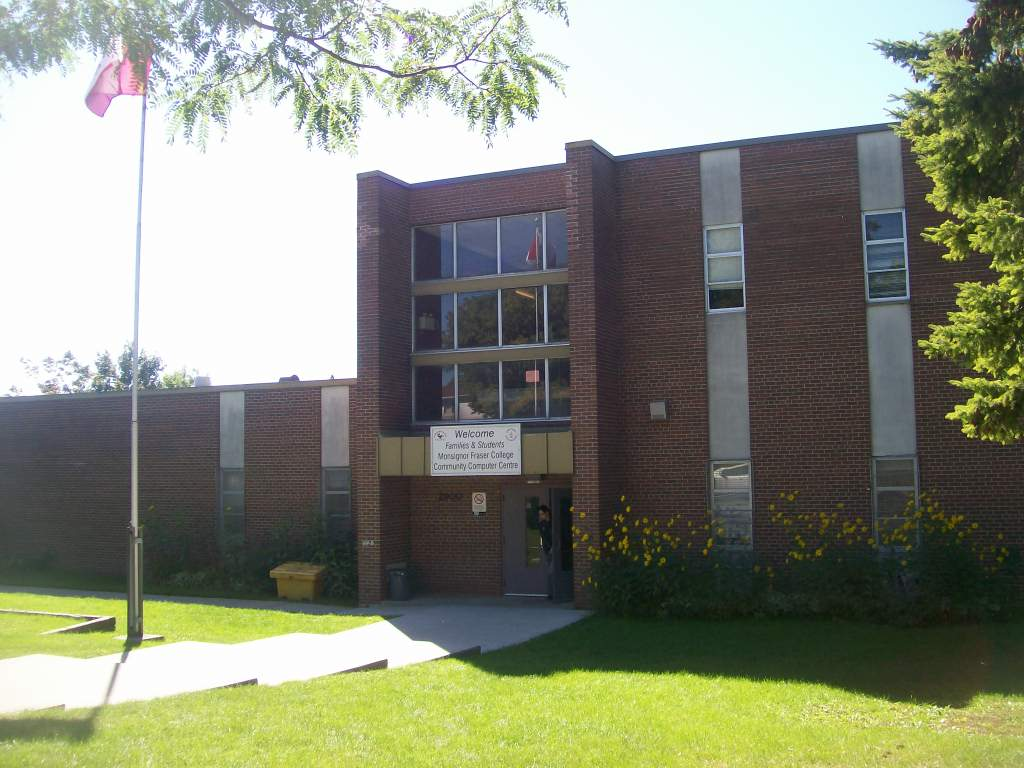
Midland Campus (Our Lady of Good Counsel)

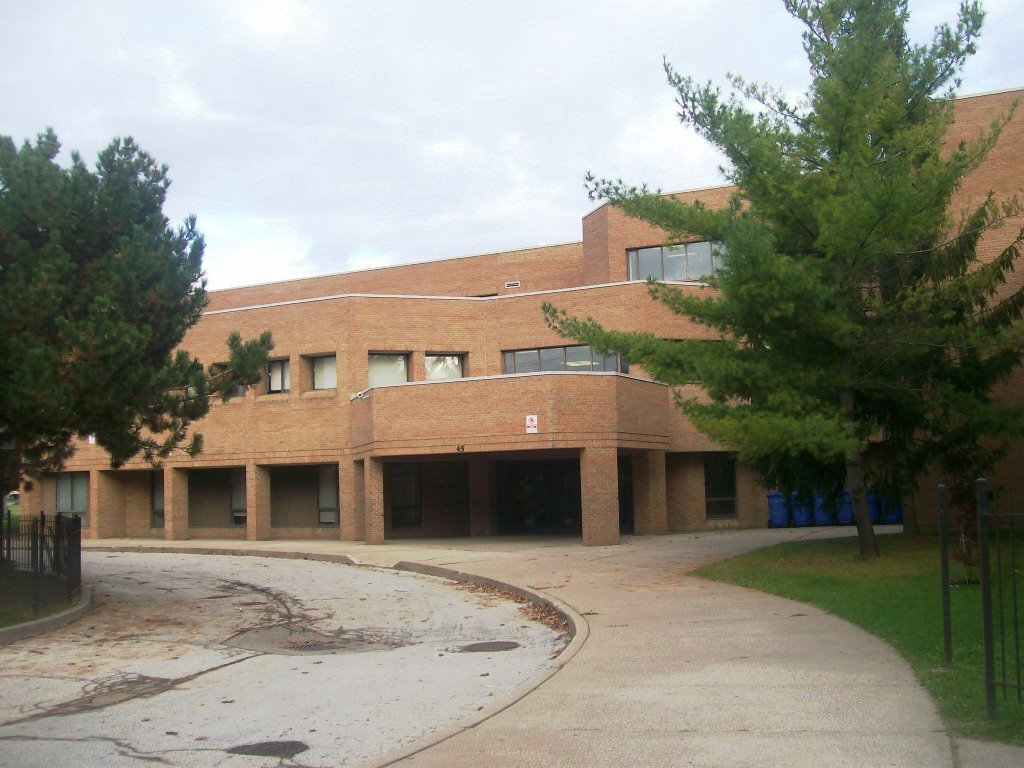
Norfinch Campus (Regina Pacis)

== See also ==
- Education in Ontario
- List of secondary schools in Ontario
- Burnhamthorpe Collegiate Institute
- City Adult Learning Centre
- Scarborough Centre for Alternative Studies
