= Alternative Pupil Placement for Limited Expelled Students =

Alternative Pupil Placement for Limited Expelled Students A.P.P.L.E.
- formerly St. Martin Catholic School

Location
- 55 Salisbury Avenue; Toronto, Ontario, M4X 1C5; Canada; 43.6674333°N 79.3646167°W

Information
- School type: Catholic expulsion alternative High school Catholic elementary school
- Religious affiliation: Catholic
- Founded: 2005
- School board: Toronto Catholic District School Board
- Superintendent: Rory McGuckin; Safe Schools, APPLE, Parent and Community Engagement; John Shanahan; Area 6
- Area trustee: Jo-Ann Davis; Ward 9
- School number: 222 / 824178
- Principal: Tracey Parish
- Grades: 7-12
- Language: English
- Public transit access: TTC: North/South: 65 Parliament; West/East: 94 Wellesley; Rapid Transit: Castle Frank
- Parish: Our Lady of Lourdes
- Website: www.tcdsb.org/school/AlternativeLearningCentres/Pages/default.aspx

The Alternative Pupil Placement for Limited Expelled Students (acronym A.P.P.L.E.) is a high school located in the Cabbagetown neighbourhood of Toronto, Ontario, Canada. It is part of the Toronto Catholic District School Board program at Monsignor Fraser College.

== As St. Martin ==
St. Martin Catholic School is a former Catholic elementary school from 1920 to 2002. It was closed in 2002 and are part of the Our Lady of Lourdes community.

== See also ==
- Education in Ontario
- List of secondary schools in Ontario
