= Madonna Catholic Secondary School =

Location
- 20 Dubray Avenue, Toronto, Ontario, M3K 1V5; Canada; 43.729713°N 79.477426°W

Information
- Motto: Fides Concordia Justitia (Faith, Charity & Justice)
- Religious affiliations: Roman Catholic (Faithful Companions of Jesus)
- Founded: 1963
- School board: Toronto Catholic District School Board (Metropolitan Separate School Board)
- Superintendent: Shawna Campbell
- Area trustee: Maria Rizzo
- Principal: Kristan McTernan
- Vice Principal: Stanley Malec
- Grades: 9-12
- Gender: Girls
- Enrolment: 738 (2020-21)
- Language: English
- Colours: Blue, White, Red
- Teams: Madonna Phoenix
- Specialist High Skills Major: Business; Health and Wellness; Non-Profit; Arts and Culture
- Website: www.tcdsb.org/schools/madonna/Pages/default.aspx

Madonna Catholic Secondary School (MCSS), formerly known as Madonna High School is an all-girls Catholic secondary school located in Toronto, Ontario, Canada administered by the Toronto Catholic District School Board (formerly the Metropolitan Separate School Board). The school was founded in 1963 by the Faithful Companions of Jesus and became a member of the MSSB family of schools in 1986.

The school is one of six all-female Catholic high schools in the district and 31 in the TCDSB. Madonna is ranked 516 in the 2017–18 Fraser Institute Report Card.

Madonna is a sister school to Chaminade College School and sports rival to Loretto Abbey Catholic Secondary School.

== History ==
Madonna High School was founded by the Faithful Companions of Jesus (FCJ) in 1963 to 75 girls, but this number rapidly increased to more than 700 as the program and facility expanded.

In its early years, it was mostly a private school, but in 1967, the FCJ entered a partnership with the Metropolitan Separate School Board (today known as the Toronto Catholic District School Board) to educate the school's grade 9 and 10, while grades 11-13 remained part of the FCJ. In 1986, Madonna formally joined the MSSB's family of secondary schools after the province extended funding to Roman Catholic high schools and Madonna ceased its role as a private high school.

== Notable alumni ==
Laura Dennis (class of 2005), professional wrestler (with TNA Wrestling and AEW)

== See also ==
- Education in Ontario
- List of secondary schools in Ontario
