= St. Pier Giorgio Frassati Catholic School =

Location
- 8 Seasons Drive; Toronto, Ontario, M1X 1X9; Canada; 43.829265°N 79.233688°W

Information
- School type: Catholic Elementary school
- Motto: We are many Faces, but just one Family
- Religious affiliation: Roman Catholic
- Founded: 2013
- School board: Toronto Catholic District School Board
- Superintendent: Kevin Malcolm; Area 7
- Area trustee: Garry Tanuan; Ward 8
- School number: 456 / 694815
- Principal: Michael Miles
- Grades: JK-8
- Enrollment: 243 (2015-16)
- Language: English
- Area: Morningside Heights
- Parish: St. Barnabas
- Full-Day Kindergarten: Yes; Year 4 Catchment - (2013-2014)
- Website: www.tcdsb.org/o/stpiergiorgiofrassati

St. Pier Giorgio Frassati Catholic School (occasionally called Blessed Pier Giorgio Frassati CS, BPGFCS, or simply as Frassati) is a Roman Catholic elementary school in Toronto, Ontario, Canada. It serves the Morningside Heights neighbourhood of Scarborough district. It is administered by the Toronto Catholic District School Board. The school is named after Pier Giorgio Frassati.

== Background ==
Until the development of Morningside Heights, there were two Catholic elementary schools in the area, St. Bede in Malvern opened in 1989 and St, Dominic Savio in Rouge Hill opened in 1999.

When the area was developed in 2002, many children in that area attended schools in the Malvern area such as St. Bede, St. Gabriel Lalemant, and Sacred Heart.

In 2007, the Toronto Catholic District School Board approved the funding from the province to build the new school for the Morningside Heights neighborhood. Originally named Morningside Heights North, the school was named Blessed Pier Giorgio Frassati in 2010. The board held a groundbreaking ceremony on November 15, 2011 to start construction on the Frassati school that was completed in January 2013. The new, barrier-free three-storey building consisting of a multi-purpose room, library, early learning rooms, and new landscaping.

Blessed Pier Giorgio Frassati held an open house event on June 13, 2013 organized by St. Bede and St. Gabriel Lalemant schools. The school finally opened in September 2013 and was officially opened and blessed two months later.

While Frassati is a feeder school, its graduates attend Lester B. Pearson, Sir William Osler, St. Mother Teresa, Francis Libermann, Mary Ward, and St. John Paul II secondary schools.
