= St. John Henry Newman Catholic High School =

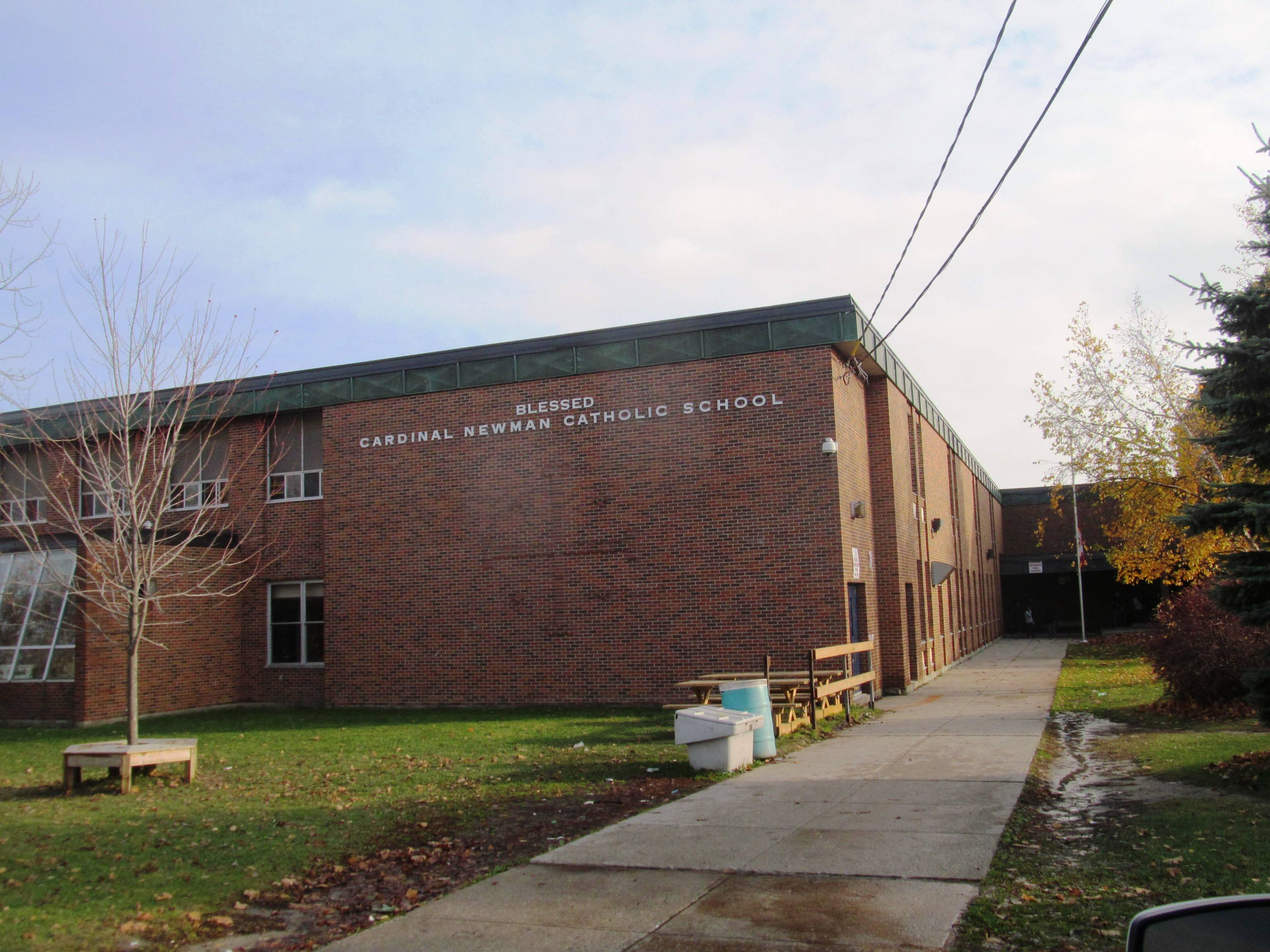

Location
- 100 Brimley Road South; Toronto, Ontario, M1M 3X4; Canada; 43.713799°N 79.240994°W

Information
- Former names: Cardinal Newman Catholic High School (1973–2011); Blessed Cardinal Newman Catholic High School (2011–2019)
- School type: Catholic High school
- Motto: Cor ad Cor Loquitur; Growing In Faith and Truth (Heart speaks to heart)
- Religious affiliation: Roman Catholic
- Founded: 1973
- School board: Toronto Catholic District School Board (Metropolitan Separate School Board)
- Superintendent: Ryan Peterson; Area 8
- School number: 519 / 694193
- Principal: Cheryl-Ann Madeira
- Grades: 9-12
- Enrolment: 851 as of 2025-26
- Language: English
- Area: Scarborough
- Colours: Red, White, and Black
- Mascot: Knight
- Team name: Newman Knights
- Yearbook: 8-Bit Memories (2024-25)
- Parish: St. Theresa Shrine
- Specialist High Skills Majors: Hospitality and Tourism; Information and Communications Technology; Non-Profit, Education and Child Care; Sports
- Program Focus: Advanced Placement; Extended French; French Immersion
- Website: www.tcdsb.org/o/stjohnhenrynewman

St. John Henry Newman Catholic High School (also known as SJHN, SJHNCHS, St. John Henry Newman CHS, St. John Henry Newman, colloquially referred to as Newman) is a Roman Catholic high school in Toronto, Ontario, Canada. It was formerly known under its original name Cardinal Newman Catholic High School until 2011 and Blessed Cardinal Newman Catholic High School until 2019. It is located in the district of Scarborough, administered by the Toronto Catholic District School Board.

The school was founded in 1973 when St. Augustine's Seminary decided to use extra classroom space due to its declining student enrollment. The school was named after Saint John Henry Newman, a 19th-century English convert to Catholicism and prolific author. Located on a 18-hectare (44-acre) campus, St. John Henry Newman Catholic High School overlooks a broad vista that contains both the Scarborough Bluffs and Lake Ontario. The motto for St. John Henry Newman is Growing in Faith and Truth.

== History ==
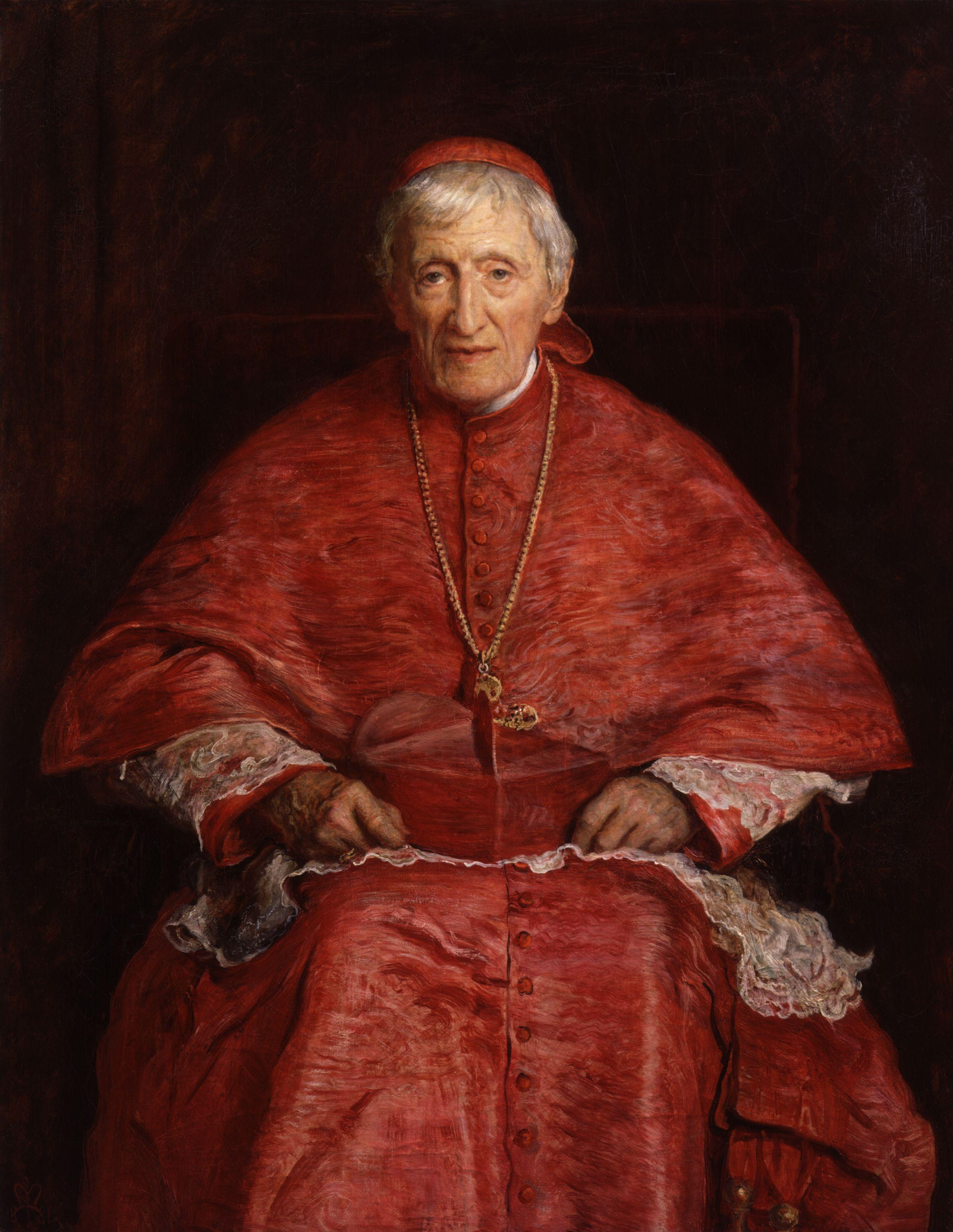
The school's namesake, John Henry Newman, in 1881.

Roman Catholic secondary education in Scarborough started its roots when its first high school, Neil McNeil High School opened its doors in 1958 for boys while Notre Dame, a Catholic school for girls, opened in 1941 in which the pupils were bused to the two schools. However, nearby Scarborough Collegiate Institute was erected in 1922 as Scarborough's main high school at that time. Over the next several years, nearby elementary schools surrounding Newman were opened before and after the dawn of the Metropolitan Separate School Board (now today as the Toronto Catholic District School Board) were erected: St. Theresa Shrine of the Little Flower Separate School in 1952, Immaculate Heart of Mary Separate School in 1959 and St. Agatha Separate School in 1964.

The facility was built in 1962 as the college for St. Augustine's Seminary due to St. Michael's College lacking a downtown campus for St. Augustine's. The college's eastern residential wing was demolished and rebuilt as Cardinal Newman, opened on September 4, 1973, with the new building erected in 1976. In contrast with the schools opened by religious orders, Newman became the first co-educational public separate high school in the former city of Scarborough.

From the beginning, Cardinal Newman was staffed by Catholic lay teachers who were teaching exclusively. Cardinal Newman is one of only two high schools in MSSB that focuses intently on an integration program for students with special needs. In addition, Cardinal Newman was at the forefront of programs like peer counselling, mediation, electronic keyboarding, and communications technology.

Cardinal Newman was at one time the only non-uniformed Roman Catholic High School in Metro Toronto. This was changed beginning in the late 1980s - early 1990s to conform with other local Catholic High Schools.

The school name was changed to Blessed Cardinal Newman in February 2011 following the beatification of John Henry Newman.

The original address for Newman was 2665 Kingston Road, the address was changed to 100 Brimley Road South in 2003 because the school signage and entrance had moved to the eastern side of the property as well as the driveway. The school's access continued to use the path via the adjacent St. Theresa Shine Catholic School.

In November 2018, the Canonization of Blessed Cardinal John Henry Newman was approved. His Canonization took place on October 13, 2019. It was expected that once he gets canonized, the school's name would be promptly readjusted, similar to other schools in the TCDSB such as St. John Paul II Catholic Secondary School, St. Mother Teresa Catholic Academy, St. Oscar Romero Catholic Secondary School, St. Kateri Tekakwitha Catholic School, St. John XXIII Catholic School and St. Marguerite Bourgeoys Catholic School.

=== Replacement school ===
St. John Henry Newman is one of the oldest buildings within the Toronto Catholic District School Board that needs massive repairs due to aging infrastructure and harsh weather. The structures built in 1964 and 1976 were originally built to house 666 pupils in capacity and require some 70% of the building's components to be replaced. Initially, 14 portables with a portapak were scattered across the school to ease perpetual overcrowding with the population doubled its size. In 2008, the portables were realigned to create an extra parking space. Twelve replacement surplus portables came from the Regina Pacis compound and the remaining eight from James Cardinal McGuigan Catholic High School, which constructed an addition at the time totalling 20 portables.

On November 9, 2015, The Ontario Government announced to spend $30 million to construct a modern, state-of-the-art school with learning spaces for 1,110 students. It will be built on the neighbouring property of Scarboro Foreign Mission Society, which closed their doors in December 2017. Demolition and construction of the new school are expected to happen, with the completion date to be determined.

== Notable alumni ==
- Eric Bauza – voice actor
- Michael Bunting – ice hockey player
- Mike Duco – ice hockey player
- Julian de Guzman – soccer player
- Francis Manapul – DC Comics writer
- Dominic Oppong – soccer player
- Ryan O'Reilly – ice hockey player
- Francesco Yates – recording artist

== See also ==
- Education in Ontario
- List of secondary schools in Ontario
- St. Augustine's Seminary
