= City Adult Learning Centre =

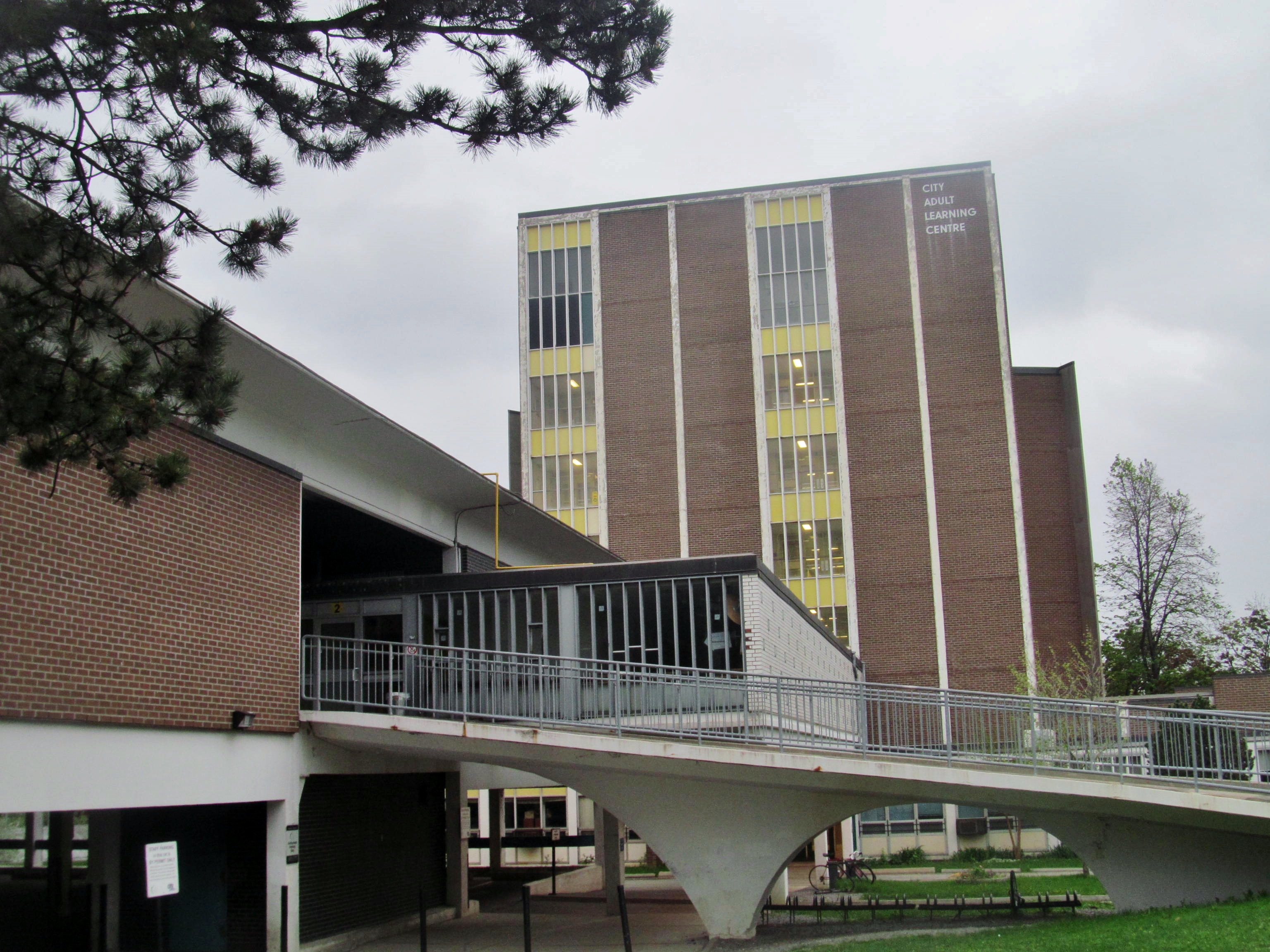
- Parkway Vocational School built in 1963, viewed south towards the Don Valley Parkway.

Location
- 1 Danforth Avenue; Riverdale, Toronto, Ontario, M4K 1M8; Canada; 43.674972°N 79.360174°W

Information
- Former name: Parkway Vocational School (1963-1974); Parkview Secondary School (1974-1983)
- School type: Alternative High School; Adult High School
- Religious affiliation: Secular
- Founded: 1963
- Status: Active
- School board: Toronto District School Board (Toronto Board of Education)
- Superintendent: Sandy Spyropoulos; LC4, Executive; Jane Phillips-Long; LN22
- Area trustee: Jennifer Story; Ward 15
- School number: 5893 / 890529; 5894 / 991457
- Principal: Rodrigo Fuentes
- Grades: 9-12
- Language: English
- Website: www.calconline.net

City Adult Learning Centre (CALC), formerly known as Parkway Vocational School and Parkview Secondary School is an adult high school serving the Riverdale community in Toronto, Ontario, Canada, overseen by the Toronto District School Board. Prior to 1998, it was part of the Toronto Board of Education.

From the beginning, the school offered vocational and technical courses. It has since evolved into a conventional adult high school offering EdVance (18–20) and adult (21 and over) classes.

== History ==
In 1961, the Toronto Board of Education in conjunction with the Metropolitan Toronto School Board, provincial, and federal governments provided the agreement of the Technical and Vocational programs across the city, and among them was Parkway. The TBE acquired and swapped a city-owned property in exchange for the site of Jarvis Junior Vocational School, a vocational unit of Jarvis Collegiate Institute.

This school is located on a 6.5-acre site on Danforth Avenue and Broadview Avenue overlooking the Don Valley Parkway.

Plans were prepared by the TBE staff and tenders were accepted on April 5, 1962. After the school board approved the tenders, the contract was awarded and construction began immediately. The datestone of the school was laid on June 5, 1962, and the new Parkway Vocational School was opened for students on September 6, 1963. The 1928 datestone of Jarvis Junior Vocational is also affixed.

At the cost of $4 million, Parkway Vocational School's floor area is 182,926 sq. ft and cost, including fees and equipment, is $24.57 per sq. ft. The school's chief architect is F.C. Etherington, and Dell Construction Company served as its contractors. Parkway officially opened on April 21, 1964.

To conserve land on the restricted site, the main centre containing the library, administrative offices, and 31 classrooms is a six-storey block, linked by covered walkways, to units on the north and south. The classroom block is served by three high-speed elevators and one freight elevator. A pedestrian bridge provides access to a city park and recreational and athletic facilities which are used by students during school hours. Construction is of precast concrete T beams for floors, reinforced concrete columns and wall fins, with brick facing panels. Windows in the six-storey block are splayed at an angle to the classrooms, providing minimum sun glare and maximum northern light.

From the beginning, this school was primarily an all-boys vocational school for skilled trades. In 1974, after the TBE deemed the name "Vocational School" became too demeaning, the school was renamed to Parkview Secondary School. Girls were admitted to the institution.

Sometime after 1983, Parkview became the City Adult Learning Centre. In 1998, the TBE had ceased to exist and was merged into the new Toronto District School Board. CALC now serves many high school dropouts and new Canadians across the former city of Old Toronto including the downtown core.

== Academic programs ==
CALC offers a variety of credit courses for adult students to obtain their Ontario Secondary School Diploma, prepare for college or university, or gain job related training. As in other TDSB adult secondary schools, the school operates in a quadmestered system, from grades 9 to 12. It consists of the EdVance program for 18 to 20 year olds and the Adult program for students aged 21 and over.

- The Career Connection / CanEX Co-op is an 18-week full-time program offering in-school classes and a volunteer work placement for New Canadians.
- As the legacy of Parkway Vocational, the Culinary Co-op Certificate Program is a CALC program that gains the knowledge and learn the skills necessary to work in the high paced, exciting world of food preparation in some of the most established and highly regarded restaurants in Toronto, as well as earning credits towards the OSSD. The school is equipped with a professional kitchen with baking and cooking areas and staff dining room.

== See also ==
- List of high schools in Ontario
