= St. Basil-the-Great College School =

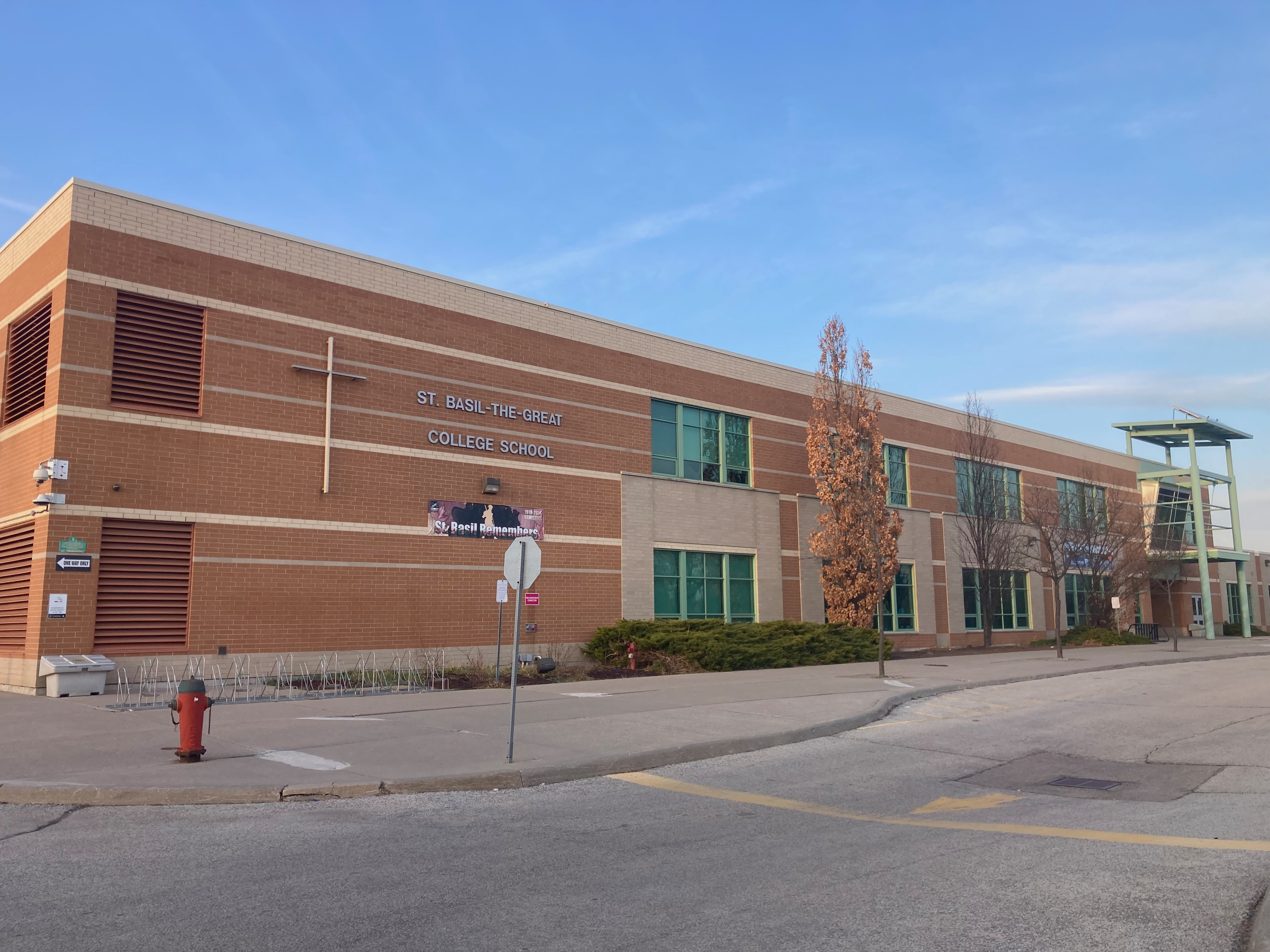
- St. Basil-the-Great College School in March 2024. It was built in the former Southam newspaper plant in 1999.

Location
- 20 Starview Lane; Pelmo Park–Humberlea, North York, Ontario, M9M 3B2; Canada; 43.727928°N 79.532855°W

Information
- School type: Catholic High school
- Motto: Excelsa Petite (Strive for that which is great)
- Religious affiliation: Roman Catholic
- Founded: 1962
- School board: Toronto Catholic District School Board (Metropolitan Separate School Board)
- Superintendent: Richard Walo; Area 1
- Area trustee: Ida Li Preti; Ward 3
- School number: 513 / 776360
- Principal: Ugo Rossi
- Vice Principal: Mariko Mackasey; Nancy Medeiros
- Grades: 9-12
- Enrolment: 1200 (2022-2023)
- Language: English
- Schedule type: Semestered
- Colours: Blue and Gold
- Team name: St. Basil Barons
- Feeder schools: see below
- Parish: St. Jude
- Specialist High Skills Major: Business; Sports
- Program Focus: International Baccalaureate; Gifted; Elite Arts/Athletes
- Website: stbasilthegreat.tcdsb.org

St. Basil-the-Great College School (also known locally as St. Basil-the-Great, SBGCS, SBC, St. Basil's, or just Basil's) is a Roman Catholic secondary school of the Toronto Catholic District School Board (formerly the Metropolitan Separate School Board) located in Toronto, Ontario, Canada.

The school was founded by the Ukrainian Basilian Fathers in 1962 as an all-boys private boarding school on the Weston and Sheppard area. It became a co-educational institution in 1970 and has been operating as a public separate school since 1986. The school was named after Basil of Caesarea, the school's patron saint.

== History ==
In September 1962, the Ukrainian Basilian Fathers (not to be confused with the Congregation of St. Basil) established St. Basil-the-Great College School on the western corner of Weston and Sheppard. It is the first Catholic high school established in the northwestern part of Toronto. Shortly before the creation of St. Basil, the area of Humberlea was served by two nearby high schools: Thistletown Collegiate Institute, opened on Islington in 1957, and Emery Collegiate Institute, also founded in 1961. To serve the needs of the Catholic community in the Weston/Sheppard area, St. Jude Separate School was erected and opened in 1960, followed by other elementary schools in the same neighbourhood, such as St. Stephen Separate School in 1961, St. Roch Separate School in 1968, St. Gaspar Separate School in 1972 and St. Simon Separate School in 1975.

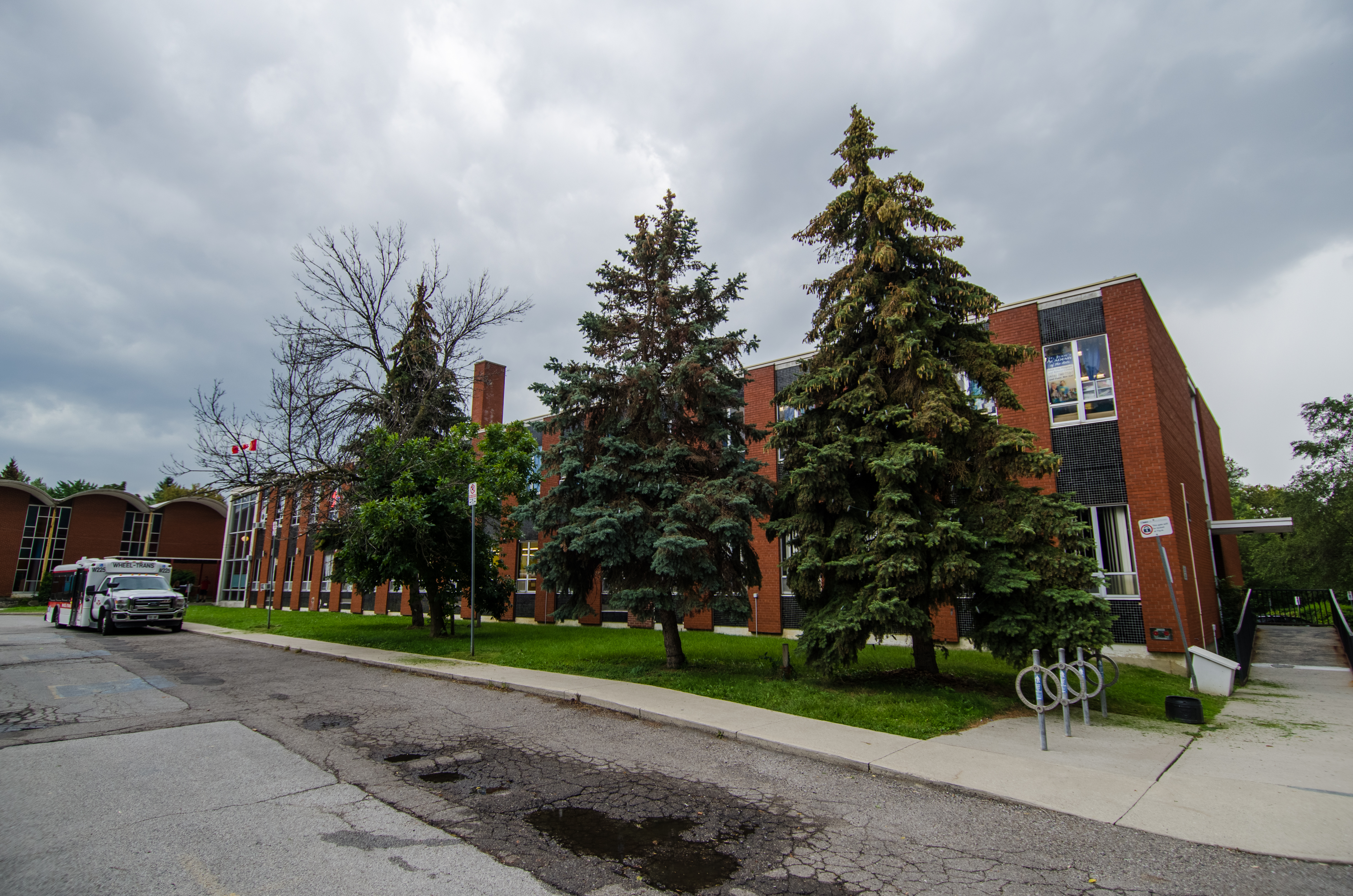
The former home of St. Basil-the-Great College School on Weston Road from 1962 to 1999.

The school was built on the former Jethro Crang family apple orchard. The property consisted of an elegant estate cottage, swimming pool, tennis court and a sizeable valley floodplain adjacent to the Humber River that surrounded Crang’s Pond.

During its early years, it began as an all-boys Roman Catholic private boarding school operated by the Basilians. This lasted until 1969 when the Basilians reached an agreement with the Metropolitan Separate School Board to educate the school's Grade 9 and 10 pupils while the higher grades remained with the order. Boarding facilities were eliminated in 1970 as girls began attending St. Basil's and became a co-educational institution.

In 1984, the provincial government began funding Catholic high schools beyond grade 10 and St. Basil ceased to be a private school by the end of 1986. As the school was grown to over 1,000 students with some settling in portables, the MSSB leased the former Melody Public School on Strathburn Blvd., on the north-eastern corner of Wilson and Weston, and designated the school as the "South Campus" for a short time.

The MSSB received funding from the province to rebuild St. Basil in 1993. In 1995, the MSSB acquired the former Southam Murray printing plant property on Starview Lane as the new home for St. Basil. The school was built in 1997 and completed in the fall of 1999. Today, the school serves over 1400 students in northwestern North York and northern Etobicoke. The former campus on Weston Road was reopened by the City of Toronto as a community centre named Carmine Stefano Community Centre after the departure of its students and staff.

== Feeder schools ==
- Beverly Heights Middle School
- Humber Summit Middle School (formerly G.B. Warren Junior High School)
- Oakdale Park Middle School
- St. Gaspar Separate School (defunct)
- St. John Vianney Separate School
- St. Jude Separate School
- St. Margherita of Città Di Castello Separate School
- St. Roch Separate School
- St. Simon Separate School
- St. Stephen Separate School
- The Elms Junior Middle School
- Venerable John Merlini Separate School
- St. Martha Catholic School

== Notable alumni ==
- Anthony Perruzza, Toronto city councilor
- Kunle Dada-Luke, professional footballer

== See also ==
- Education in Ontario
- List of secondary schools in Ontario
