= Notre Dame High School (Toronto) =

Coordinates: 43.680798°N 79.293471°W

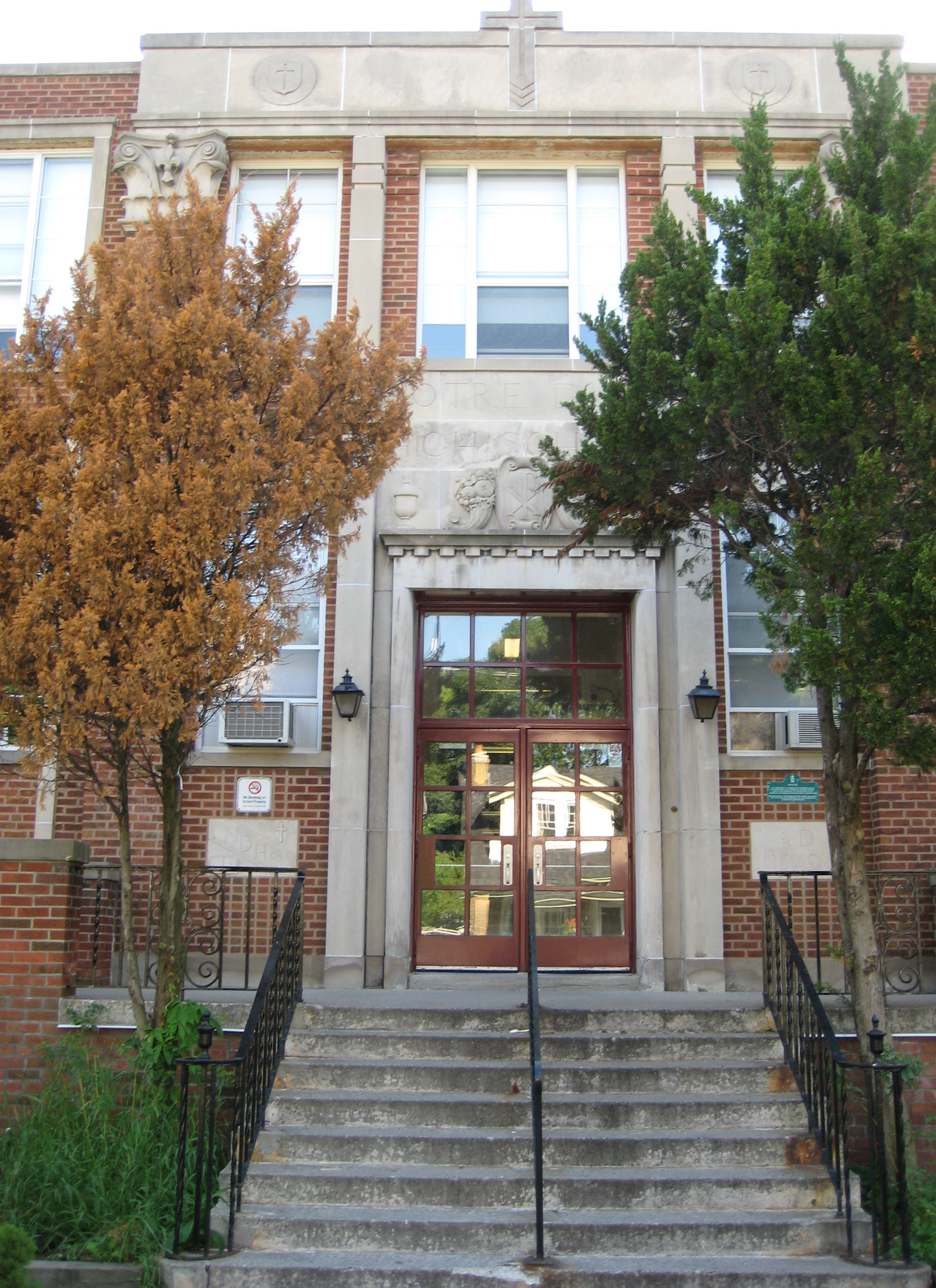

Location
- 12 Malvern Avenue; Toronto, Ontario, M4E 3E1; Canada

Information
- School type: Catholic High school
- Motto: Ubi Honor Ibi Sum (Where there is honour, there am I)
- Founded: 1941
- Sister school: Neil McNeil
- School board: Toronto Catholic District School Board (Metropolitan Separate School Board)
- Superintendent: Kimberly Dixon; Area 6
- Area trustee: Angela Kennedy; Ward 11
- School number: 501 / 738115
- Principal: Kathleen Henderson
- Grades: 9-12
- Enrolment: 670 (2017-18)
- Language: English
- Colours: Wine and White
- Team name: Dame Spirit
- Affiliation: Roman Catholic (Congregation of Notre Dame)
- Parish: St. John
- Specialist High Skills Major: Health and Wellness; Information and Communications Technology
- Program Focus: Broad-based Technology; Gifted; Advanced Placement
- Website: notredame.tcdsb.org

Notre Dame High School (also known as NDHS, Notre Dame H.S., Notre Dame, or simply Dame) is an all-girls Roman Catholic secondary school in Toronto, Ontario, Canada. This school is a member of the Toronto Catholic District School Board (formerly the Metropolitan Separate School Board) serving the Upper Beaches neighbourhood.

The school was founded by the Sisters of the Congregation of Notre Dame in 1941. Notre Dame is one of 30 high schools run by the TCDSB and one of six all-girls schools. The school has an enrolment of 670 students. The school's patron saint is Marguerite Bourgeoys.

== See also ==
- Education in Ontario
- List of secondary schools in Ontario
