= St. Mother Teresa Catholic Academy =

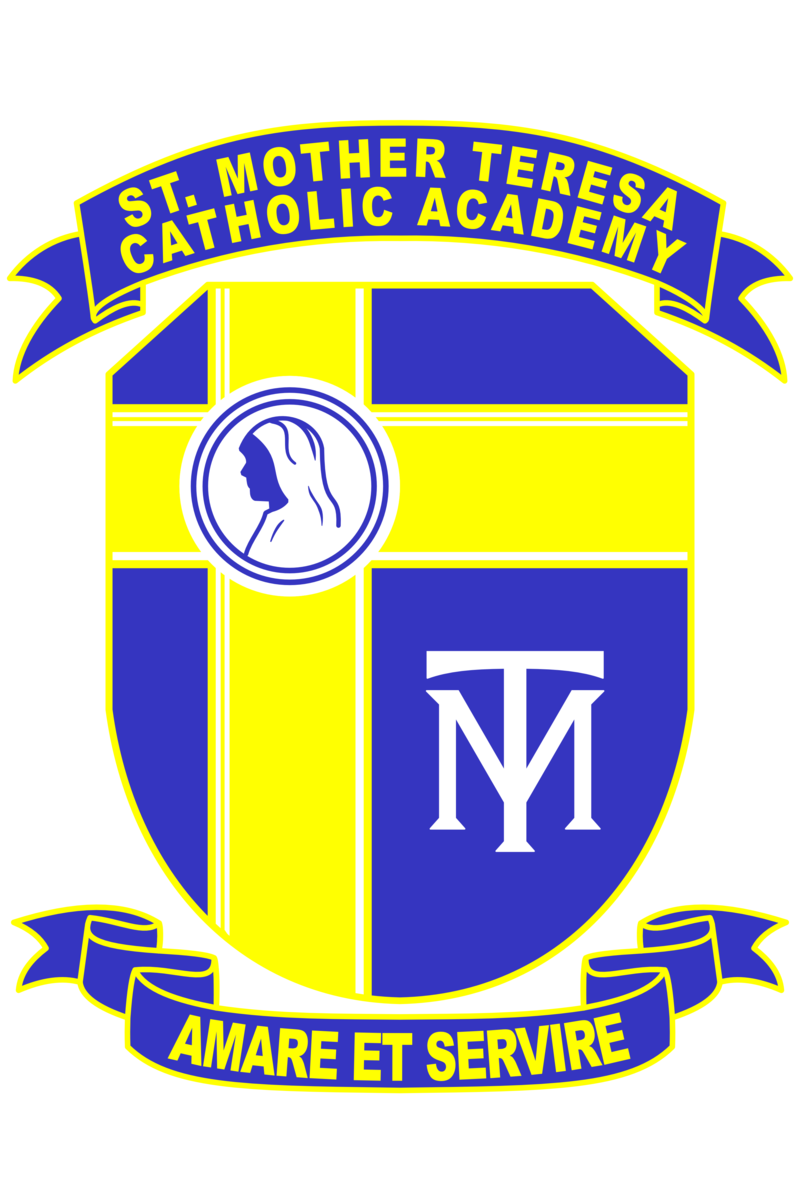

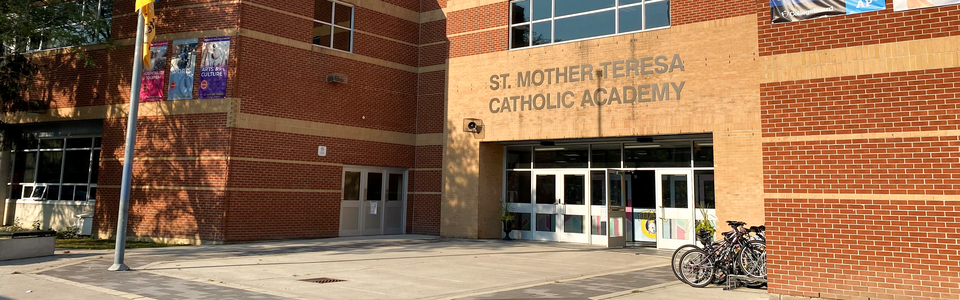
- Campus exterior

Location
- 40 Sewells Road; Toronto, Ontario, M1B 3G5; Canada; 43.808720°N 79.216404°W

Information
- School type: Catholic High school Art school
- Motto: Amare et Servire (To Love and To Serve)
- Religious affiliation: Roman Catholic
- Founded: 1985
- School board: Toronto Catholic District School Board
- Superintendent: Ryan Peterson; Area 7
- Area trustee: Garry Tanuan; Ward 8
- School number: 538 / 733024
- Principal: Anne Louise Bannon
- Grades: 9 to 12
- Enrolment: 450 (2017-18)
- Language: English
- Area: Malvern
- Colours: Blue and Gold
- Team name: Teresa Titans
- Public transit access: TTC: West/East: 131 Nugget, 132 Milner, 133 Neilson; Rapid Transit: Scarborough Centre
- Parish: St. Barnabas
- Specialist High Skills Major: Arts and Culture; Hospitality and Tourism; Sports
- Program Focus: Regional Arts Program; Cyber Arts; Cyber Studies; Broad-based Technology; Gifted
- Website: www.tcdsb.org/schools/stmotherteresacatholicacademy/

St. Mother Teresa Catholic Academy (SMTCA, St. Mother Teresa, SMT, Mother Teresa, or Teresa for short); also known as by its former names Blessed Mother Teresa Catholic Secondary School before 2016 and Mother Teresa Catholic Secondary School in its inception is a Catholic secondary school in Toronto, Ontario, Canada. It serves the Malvern neighbourhood of Scarborough.

== History ==
Blessed Mother Teresa Catholic Secondary School logo used from 1985 to 2011, the Blessed name was added in 2003. It continues to appear sparingly on letterheads and other promotions.

=== The founder of Missionaries of Charity ===
The school is named after Mother Teresa of Calcutta founded the Roman Catholic religious congregation, Missionaries of Charity, which in 2012 consisted of over 4,500 sisters and is active in 133 countries. Her beatification by Pope John Paul II in 2003 following her death gave her the title "Blessed Teresa of Calcutta".

=== Foundings ===
Front foyer of the school containing the glass statue of Mother Teresa, viewed from the north end.

After the construction of several subdivisions in the Malvern area in the 1970s, Lester B. Pearson Collegiate Institute, the high school in that area, was opened in 1978.

In its conception, on September 3, 1985, a new school in the Scarborough area of Toronto was to be named Mary Ward. Then trustee Harold Adams advocated for the new school to be named Mother Teresa Catholic Secondary School. Another school was built later, and that received the name Mary Ward Catholic Secondary School. The ideals of the school's patroness and namesake, Mother Teresa, became the inspiration for the school's motto. The first principal was George Iantorno, and the school initially had approximately 150 grade 9 students.

As a result of the beatification, the board changed the school's name to Blessed Mother Teresa in 2003. Her subsequent canonization and enrolment increase attempt led the board to rebrand the school as St. Mother Teresa Catholic Academy in October 2016.

== Notable alumni ==
- Kamal Miller, professional soccer player

== See also ==
- Education in Ontario
- List of secondary schools in Ontario
