= Adult high school =

Secondary school operated to serve adult students

An adult high school or adult school is a high school facility designed for adult education. It is intended for adults who have not completed high school to continue their education. Some adult high schools offer child care, special integration programs for immigrants and refugees, career and other programs and services geared toward the special needs of adult students. Some adult high schools may also offer general interest programs such as computer skills or other continuing education courses.

== History ==
Samuel Fox is credited with helping William Singleton to start the first "Adult School" in Nottingham, England in 1798. Initially, the classes were for young women from local lace and hosiery factories. William Singleton, a Methodist, started the school, but it was Fox and the staff from his grocer shop that maintained it. Fox's staff was expected to teach at this school and Fox provided breakfast at 9 a.m. on a Sunday after they had completed two hours of teaching. The school grew to include men, but it was said that Fox was specifically interested in improving adult education. Lessons are believed to have started with a Bible reading, but the book was then used as a textbook to enable scholars to practise reading and writing. Fox conducted lessons for three mornings a week for students of more advanced arithmetic and he would fund some to go to become teachers themselves.

Individual schools were affiliated to the National Adult School Union. At an event in October 1948 in Nottingham to celebrate the Union's 150th anniversary, it was stated that delegates from between 700 and 800 schools across England, Wales and Scotland were invited.
