= Regina Pacis Catholic Secondary School =

Catholic high school in University Heights, Toronto, Ontario, Canada

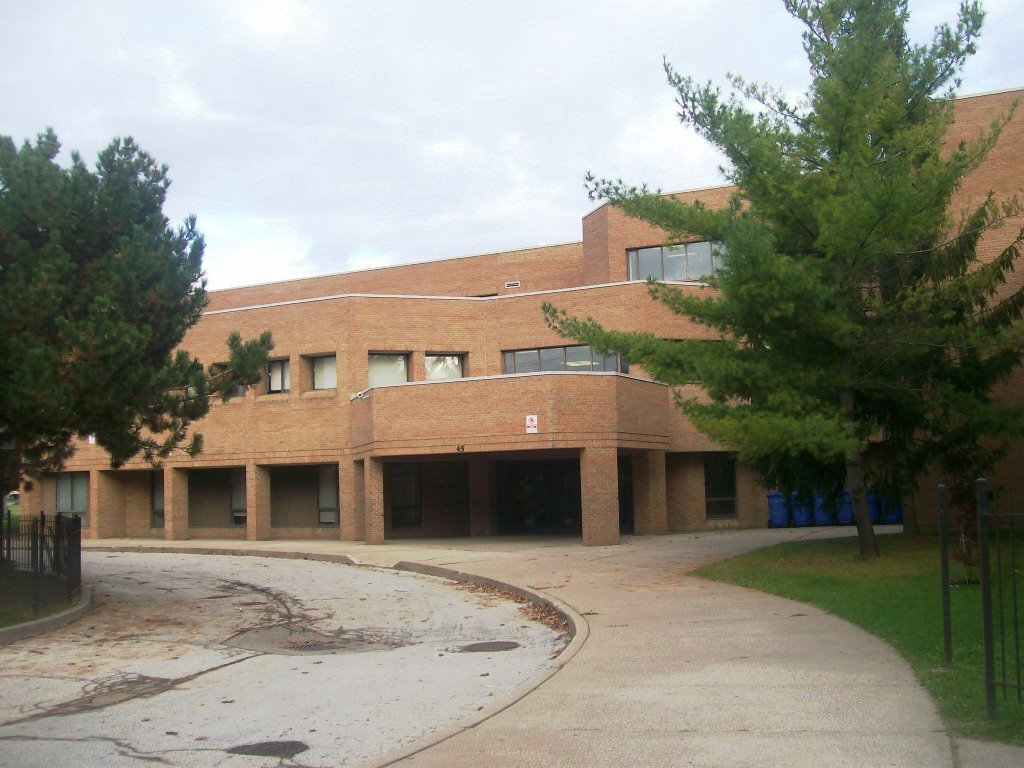

Location
- 45 Norfinch Drive; Toronto, Ontario, M3N 1W8; Canada; 43.757187°N 79.526820°W

Information
- School type: Catholic High school
- Motto: Pax et Lux (Peace and Light)
- Religious affiliations: Roman Catholic (Holy Ghost Fathers)
- Founded: 1980
- Status: Core Holding
- Closed: 2002
- School board: Toronto Catholic District School Board (Metropolitan Separate School Board)
- Superintendent: Gina Iuliano-Marrello; Area 3
- Area trustee: Patrizia Bottoni; Ward 4
- School number: 526 / 752886
- Principal: Jim Matthews
- Grades: 9-13
- Enrollment: 523 (1998-99)
- Language: English
- Colours: Royal and Light Blue
- Team name: Pacis Olympians
- Public transit access: TTC: North/South: 35 Jane; West/East: 36 Finch West, 84D Sheppard West; Rapid Transit: Jane, Finch
- Parish: St. Roch
- Website: web.archive.org/web/20000901221043/http://www.tcdsb.on.ca/schools/reginapacis.html

Regina Pacis Catholic Secondary School (Regina Pacis CSS, RPCSS, Regina Pacis High, or Pacis in short) is a former Catholic secondary school in Toronto, Ontario, Canada. From 1980 to 2002, it was operated by the Toronto Catholic District School Board serving the Downsview neighbourhood. The name Regina Pacis comes from Latin which means Queen of Peace, referring to the Virgin Mary.

== History ==
Regina Pacis was founded in 1980 by Father Gerald Fitzgerald, CSSp and the Holy Ghost Fathers using the temporary facilities of St. Philip Neri Catholic School. Since its closure, Regina Pacis has been used by the school board as a holding school. For instance at first, the building served as the temporary home of Immaculate Conception Catholic School from 2003-2005 upon construction of the new, replacement campus on Comay Road.

== Overview ==
=== Campus ===
Regina Pacis is located in 5 acres of land with the new three storey building built in 1982. The school has 23 academic classrooms, three science labs, a wide atrium, two arts rooms, two music rooms, two industrial art rooms, a home economics room, a cafeteria with servery attached, a gymnatorium that can be partitioned into two smaller gyms with a stage, a chapel, and three staircases.

== See also ==
- List of high schools in Ontario
