= Toronto Catholic District School Board =

Catholic separate school board in Toronto, Canada

Toronto Catholic District School Board formerly known as Metropolitan Separate School Board (MSSB)

Location
- 80 Sheppard Avenue East, Toronto, Ontario, M2N 6E8, Canada Canada

District information
- Motto: "In God’s Image: Growing in Knowledge, with Justice and Hope." "Imagine the Possibilities"
- Established: April 2, 1953 (MSSB) January 2, 1998 (current form)
- Chief executive officer: Brendan Browne
- Chair of the board: Daniel Di Giorgio
- Schools: 163 elementary schools 29 secondary schools 2 combined schools 2 alternative schools
- Budget: ~CA$1.1B (2021-2022)
- District ID: B67059

Other information
- Website: www.tcdsb.org

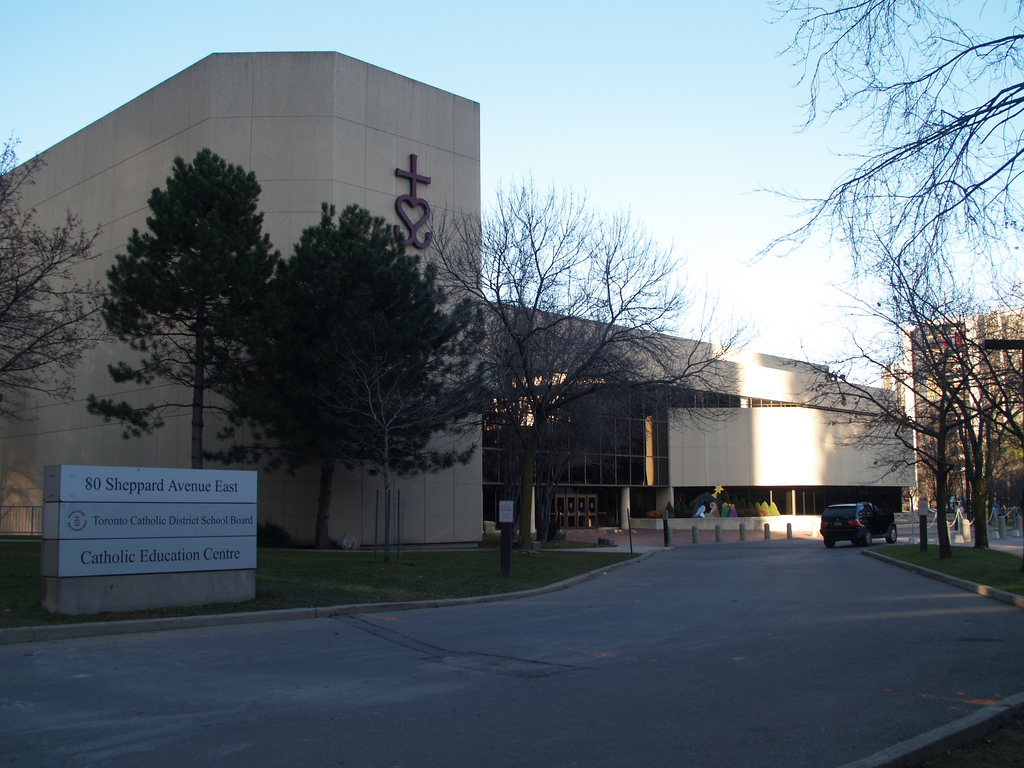
Headquarters of the school board

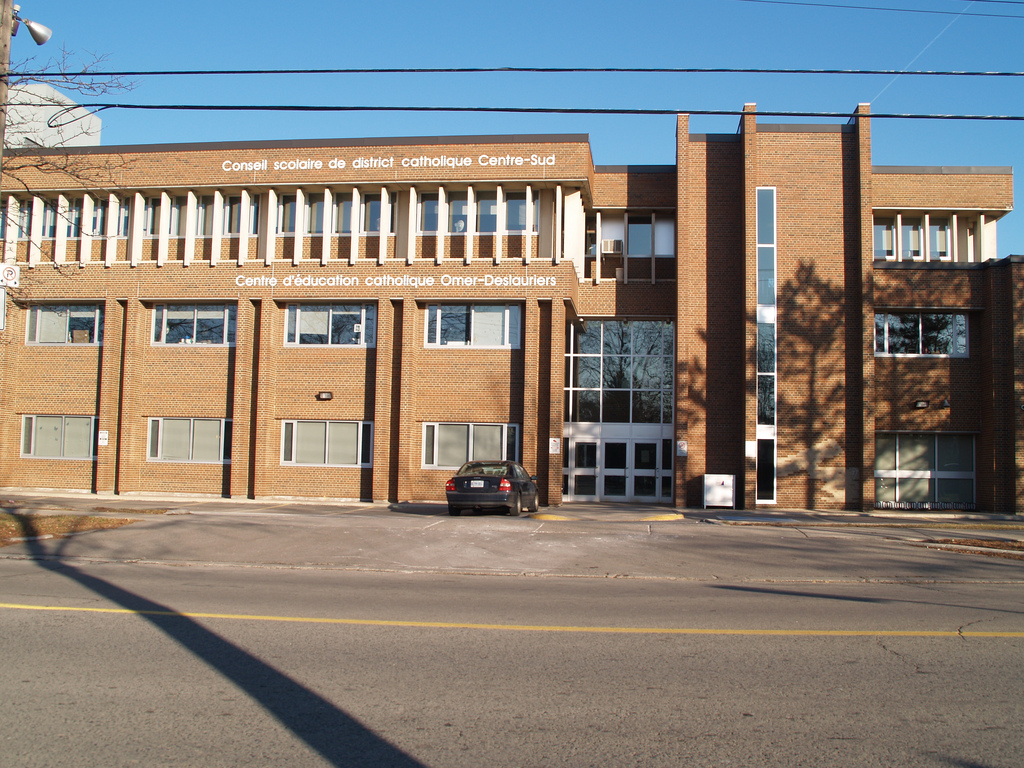
The former headquarters of the board's French unit, Section de langue française

The Toronto Catholic District School Board (TCDSB, known as the English-language Separate District School Board No. 40 prior to 1999) is an English-language public-separate school board for Toronto, Ontario, Canada, headquartered in North York. It is one of the two English boards of education serving the city of Toronto.

The board was founded on April 2, 1953, as the Metropolitan Separate School Board (MSSB) when nearby separate school districts were amalgamated as a singular separate school board in Metro Toronto. In addition to English-language schools, the board also operated a handful of French-language schools by the Conseil des écoles catholiques du Grand Toronto (CECGT), the board's French unit. In 1998, the MSSB was renamed and reorganized into the Toronto Catholic District School Board leaving the board with anglophone schools while the francophone schools that were previously operated by CECGT were amalgamated with nearby French school boards in the region to form Conseil scolaire de district catholique Centre-Sud.

With more than 84,000 students, the TCDSB is one of the largest school boards in Canada, and is the largest publicly funded Catholic school board in the world.

== History ==
TCDSB's former entity, Metropolitan Separate School Board. This logo was used from 1969 to 1997.

On April 2, 1953, the Metropolitan Separate School Board (French: Le Conseil des écoles catholiques du Grand Toronto), officially known as the Metropolitan Toronto Roman Catholic Separate School Board (MTRCSSB) was formed as the governing body of all publicly funded Roman Catholic schools in Toronto through the merger of several separate boards in Metro Toronto. The merger was passed through Bill 37, the Metropolitan Separate School Board Act.

At its peak in 1990, the board operated 185 anglophone and six francophone elementary schools and 41 anglophone and one francophone secondary schools with 100,000 total students. The MSSB took over seven high schools transferred from the Metropolitan Toronto School Board (MTSB) in 1988, with one of them being a francophone Catholic high school, the institution that has been lost since 1968. The MSSB was the largest school board in Canada at the time.

In 1997, as a result of Bill 104, the Fewer School Boards Act, the boards were reorganized resulting in the separation of English and French language schools. The MSSB became known as English-language Separate District School Board No. 40 and renamed itself to the Toronto Catholic District School Board in 1999 while the former Section de langue française unit became part of the new French-language Separate District School Board No. 64 which later became Conseil scolaire de district catholique Centre-Sud.

The board headquarters were located on Duke Street, then Jarvis Street, and the MSSB moved its operations in 1964 to 150 Laird Drive, the former headquarters of Durant Motors and later, Imperial Oil. In 1982, the board moved to its current administrative headquarters and offices on 80 Sheppard Avenue East. The school board also had the offices for Section de langue française on Drewry Avenue, opened in 1989 in the former Lewis S. Beattie Secondary School, though it has since been occupied by Conseil scolaire catholique MonAvenir as its administrative offices.

== Organization ==
The Toronto Catholic District School Board mission statement that nurtures "the faith development and academic excellence of our Catholic learning community through the love of God, neighbour, and self." The vision encourages learning communities of the Board to follow God's Image that grows in "Knowledge, with Justice and Hope."

The school board is governed by 12 elected trustees who serve for a four-year term. Trustees are paid $18,500 a year in salary, and can claim up to $18,000 for expenses. Prior to the 1998 separation of French-language schools, the Metropolitan Separate School Board had three French language seats. The policies of the Board are administered by the Director of Education and designates.

There are more than 91,000 students serving over 195 Catholic schools, and represent close to 475,000 Catholic school supporters in all of Toronto. The TCDSB also has staff consisting of 6,000 teachers, 2,800 support staff, 360 principals and vice principals, and 200 administrators.

In addition, the Board operates standing three committees: the Student Achievement and Well Being, Catholic Education and Human Resources, Corporate Affairs, Strategic Planning and Property, & Governance Framework.

=== Trustees ===
As of 2026, the trustee boundaries are aligned with the municipal wards, which was realigned to match with the federal and provincial ward boundaries.

Ward	Trustee	Municipal Ward	Federal and Provincial Riding	TDSB Corresponding Ward	Notes
1	Joseph Martino	1	Etobicoke North	1	
2	Markus De Domenico	2	Etobicoke Centre	2	Chair of the Board
3	Ida Li Preti	7	Humber River—Black Creek	4	
4	Teresa Lubinski	3, 4	Etobicoke-Lakeshore; Parkdale-High Park	3, 7	
5	Maria Rizzo	6, 8, 10	York Centre; Eglinton-Lawrence; Willowdale	5, 8, 12	
6	Frank D'Amico	9	Davenport	9	
7	Mike Del Grande	21, 22	Scarborough Centre; Scarborough-Agincourt	17, 20	
8	Garry Tanuan	23, 25	Scarborough North; Scarborough-Rouge Park	21, 22	
9	Kevin Morrison	10, 11, 12, 13	Spadina-Fort York; University-Rosedale; Toronto-St. Paul's; Toronto Centre	8, 9, 10	Vice-chair of the Board
10	Daniel Di Giorgio	5	York South-Weston	7, 9	
11	Angela Kennedy	14, 15, 16, 17, 19	Toronto-Danforth; Don Valley West; Don Valley East; Don Valley North; Beaches-East York	11, 13, 14, 15, 16	
12	Nancy Crawford	20, 24	Scarborough Southwest; Scarborough-Guildwood	18, 19	
Student Trustee(s)	JoyGold Goodluck (Father Henry Carr); Ruben Da Silveira (Marshall McLuhan)	---	---	---	

==== Chairs of the Board ====
Italics indicate the trustee remains active.

- Averell Robinson, Q.C. - 1953–1954; Original chair of the MSSB
- Rev. Msgr. Hugh Callaghan, D.P. - 1954–1955
- Gerard Godin - 1956–1957
- Georges B. Heenan - 1958–1959
- Michael J. Duggan - 1960–1962
- Edward J. Brisbois - 1963–1965
- Dr. John J. Andrachuk - 1966–1967
- Rev. Msgr. Percy H. Johnson, P.H. 1968–1969; School named after him.
- J.A. Fullerton - 1970–1971
- J.A. Marrese - 1972–1974
- Joseph Grittani - 1975–1976
- Rev. E.F. Boehler - 1977–1978
- Bruno M. Suppa - 1979–1980
- Paul J. Duggan - 1981–1982
- Edward T. McMahon - 1983–1984; 1996–1997
- Rev. E.F. Boehler - 1984–1985
- Rev. C. Matthews, S.J. - 1985–1986
- Caroline M. DiGiovanni - 1986–1988
- Michael Lofranco - 1988–1989
- Donald E. Clune - 1989–1992
- Elvira DeMonte - 1992–1994
- Paul B.R. Fernandes - 1994–1996
- Joseph Martino - 1997–1999 - Last chair as MSSB and first chair of the reorganized TCDSB.
- Rose Andrachuk - 1999–2000
- Mike Del Grande - 2000–2001 - Later became city councilor; 2014–2015
- Joseph Carnevale - 2001–2003;
- Oliver Carroll - 2003–2007 - Ousted in early 2009 for conflict of interest charges. Now serves as a teacher for the Toronto District School Board since 2010 and teaches at Scarborough Centre for Alternative Studies from 2012 onwards.
- Catherine LeBlanc-Miller - 2008–2009
- Angela Kennedy - 2009–2010 - later removed by the judge and was later re-elected; 2015–2016
- Ann Andrachuk - 2010–2013
- Jo-Ann Davis - 2013–2014
- Barbara Poplawski - 2017–18
- Maria Rizzo - 2018–2019
- Angela Kennedy - 2019–2020
- Joe Martino - 2020–2022
- Nancy Crawford - 2022–24
- Markus de Domenico - 2024 to Present

=== Directors of Education ===
==== Current ====
The current director of education is Dr. Brendan Browne, who was appointed in 2020. Prior to his appointment, Browne served as the central superintendent for the Toronto District School Board covering schools in most of the former North York and Scarborough.

==== Past directors ====
- B. E. Nelligan - 1965–1983
- Berchman Kipp - 1983–1989
- Tony Barone - 1989–1996
- Norm Forma - 1996–1997
- Johanne Stewart - 1997–2001
- Tom Donavan - 2001–2005
- Noel Martin (Acting) - 2005
- Kevin Kobus - 2005–2007
- Les Nemes - 2007–2009
- Ann Perron - 2009–2011
- Bruce Rodrigues - 2011–2013 (now CEO at EQAO)
- Angela Gauthier - 2013-2017 (served as Interim Director in 2011)
- Rory McGuckin - 2017–2020
- Brendan Browne - 2020 to present

== School bus transportation ==
The following service providers have been contracted by the school board:

- Attridge Transportation
- Dignity Transportation
- First Student Canada
- McCluskey Transportation Services
- Sharp Bus Lines
- Stock Transportation
- Switzer-Carty Transportation
- Toronto Transit Commission
- Wheelchair Accessible Transit

== Uniforms ==
Uniforms are mandatory for students at the secondary level and elementary starting in the fall 2011. In 2010 some elementary schools started implementing use of uniforms.

In 1988, the MSSB ruled that public separate high schools are required to wear uniforms. At the time, all of the high schools in Scarborough except for Newman had uniforms. Some trustees anticipated protests from parents and students from Newman.

As of 2020, all TCDSB elementary students must wear a uniform of a white or navy blue top, and navy blue bottoms. This is enforced in special programs such as the gifted program and ME.

== Controversies ==
=== Government funding ===
Recently, the issue of government funding for religious schools has become a major political issue (see 2007 Ontario general election), with PC Party Leader John Tory supporting an extension of funding to all religious schools, Dalton McGuinty's Liberals and Howard Hampton's NDP supporting the status quo, and Frank de Jong's Greens alone calling for elimination of public funding for all religious schools (including Catholic Schools).

=== Labour issues ===
The first strikes occurred on April 5–11, 1986 when 6,000 teachers of the Metro Separate School Board went on strike with over 100,000 students affected.

From August 2002, the Toronto Catholic elementary teachers were without a contract and imposed work to rule beginning February 2003. With stalled negotiations, the TCDSB officially locked out the teachers on May 16, 2003, and the strike lasted 12 days which left 69,000 students affected. The lockout ended when the Ontario government enacted back-to-work legislation on June 3, 2003.

Conflict arose once again when the TCDSB elementary teachers imposed work to rule once more in 2016.

Again in 2021, during the middle of a pandemic, teachers imposed work to rule, leaving report cards blank and ordering their members to not help in distribution of their students personal belongs in June 2021, without resolution in sight as of August 2021.

=== Trustee spending scandal ===
The board was embroiled in controversy in May 2008 when a report commissioned by the provincial government uncovered spending abuses by certain trustees, including charges for meals, promotional materials, and prohibited benefits. Provincial supervisor Norbert Hartmann was appointed to oversee administration of the board as a result.

=== Incidents between students and faculty ===
During a school trip organized by Holy Spirit Catholic School's eighth-grade students, vice-principal Stephen Patel threw a shoe at 14-year-old student Ian Goulbourne, hitting him in the forehead while on an excursion in Montreal on the school bus on April 24, 2013. Goulborune was taken to the Montreal Children's Hospital to be treated and Patel was sent home the next day on the Via Rail train on paid leave by the TCDSB while it investigated such incident.

A few weeks later, Ferdinando Marrello, a teacher at Monsignor Fraser College was charged with allegations of assaulting a female student who was grabbed by the throat and punched in the face.

In August 2018, Gerry McGilly, 47-year-old former English teacher at Bishop Allen Academy was sentenced to 2–3 years in prison after he pleaded guilty to luring, making child pornography and sexual exploitation of his students, including three 17-year-old victims, dated between 2014 and 2017.

On May 1, 2019, Toronto Police formally charged 35-year-old Justin Iozzo, teacher of Father John Redmond Catholic Secondary School of one count of sexual assault and one count of sexual interference that occurred in December 2016 when a student was assaulted on school property. Iozzo had been employed by the Board since 2012 and started his teaching career at Stella Maris and St. John the Evangelist Catholic Schools. However, thirteen days later, Toronto Police arrested 36-year-old Brian Ross, a teacher and coach at Senator O'Connor College School, who is facing charges of sexual assault stemming from a string of incidents during the 2011–12 academic year including a 16-year-old female student being assaulted during his 10-year tenure at Marshall McLuhan Catholic Secondary School and another in March 2017.

=== LGBT issues ===
The TCDSB has a number of issues with the LGBT communities and the Roman Catholic education in Toronto.

In May 2013, two trustees, Gary Tanuan and John Del Grande, the son of Mike Del Grande, proposed a motion to eliminate Gay-straight alliances in all TCDSB schools. The motion stated that the "Toronto Catholic District School Board schools shall have no Gay Straight Alliance (GSA) clubs or similar."

However, in November 2020, the TCDSB imposed sanctions against Mike Del Grande over the LGBT2Q+ comments during the November 7, 2019 meeting for comparing homosexuality to bestiality, pedophilia and cannibalism. Del Grande violated the code of conduct for trustees.

On January 8, 2021, the TCDSB removed the Lesbian Gay Bi Trans Youth Line, a phone peer support line for youth, from their online mental health resource list for students. The removal of YouthLine coincided the same time as when Joe Volpe ran an opinion piece in Corriere Canadese purporting that YouthLine is inappropriate. YouthLine refuted Volpe's article, calling it "homophobic, transphobic, and racist." YouthLine reaffirmed that their anonymous services provide queer, transgender and questioning youth much needed information and resources. Pride Toronto called TCDSB's decision "another example of systemic homophobia and transphobia that continues to run deep within the publicly-funded school board." In May 2022, Youthline and the other defendants won their case in the Ontario Superior Court of Justice, and all of Volpe's charges against them were dropped.

On May 6, 2021, the TCDSB voted to recognize June as Pride Month and the raising of the LGBT rainbow flag in all schools and board offices for the first time since the board's inception in 1953. The move comes after Halton Catholic District School Board rejected the vote on raising the gay flag while the Waterloo Catholic District School Board approved the raising of the rainbow flag a month prior.

== See also ==
- Roman Catholic Archdiocese of Toronto
- Toronto District School Board
- Conseil scolaire Viamonde
- Conseil scolaire catholique MonAvenir
- List of school districts in Ontario
