= List of works by Gordon Adamson =

This is a list of works by the architect Gordon Adamson.

Name	City	Address	Year	Status
Clare Wood House ("Sun House")	Toronto	7 Dale Avenue	1944	
Ben Sadowski House	Toronto	Bayview Avenue	1950	
K. W. Peacock House	Toronto	98 Teddington Park Avenue	1950	
Cleeve Horne House	Toronto	181 Balmoral Avenue	1952	
Lanor Road Public School	Etobicoke	450 Lanor Ave	1952	
Lawrence Park United Church	North York	2180 Bayview Ave	1952	
Royal York Collegiate Institute (Etobicoke School of the Arts)	Etobicoke	675 Royal York Road	1953	
Savoy Plaza Apartments	Toronto	130 Old Forest Hill Road	1953	
Holt Renfrew Building	Toronto	144 Bloor Street West	1955	Demolished
Alderwood Collegiate Institute	Etobicoke	300 Valermo Drive	1955	Demolished
The Convent of the Good Shepherd	Toronto	25 Good Shepherd Court	1956	
Defence Research Medical Laboratories	Toronto	1133 Sheppard Avenue West	1956	
Redpath Sugar Plant	Toronto	95 Queens Quay East	1957	
Thistletown Collegiate Institute	Etobicoke	20 Fordwich Drive	1957	
James Crothers House	Toronto	28 Valleyanna Drive	1958	
St. Clair Balfour House	Toronto	17 Ardwold Gate	1960	Demolished
E. J. Pratt Library	Toronto	71 Queen's Park Crescent East	1960	
Kipling Collegiate Institute	Etobicoke	380 The Westway	1960	
Peacock and McQuigge Building	Toronto	1135 Leslie Street	1961	
Y.M.C.A. Building	Toronto	4588 Bathurst Street	1961	Demolished
Bathurst Jewish Centre	Toronto	4588 Bathurst Street	1961	
William Wrigley Jr. Company Building	Toronto	1123 Leslie Street	1962	
Kingsmill Secondary School (Bishop Allen Academy)	Etobicoke	721 Royal York Road	1963	
Parkdale Library	Toronto	1303 Queen Street West	1964	
Sir John A. Macdonald Collegiate Institute	Scarborough	2300 Pharmacy Avenue	1964	
Humbergrove Secondary School (Father Henry Carr Catholic Secondary School)	Etobicoke	1760 Martin Grove Road	1966	
Humber Summit Middle School	Toronto	60 Pearldale Avenue	1969	
Keiller Mackay Collegiate Institute (Don Bosco Catholic Secondary School)	Etobicoke	2 St. Andrew’s Boulevard	1971	
Banting Memorial High School	Alliston	203 Victoria Street E	1950	
