= Rexdale =

- Neighbourhood
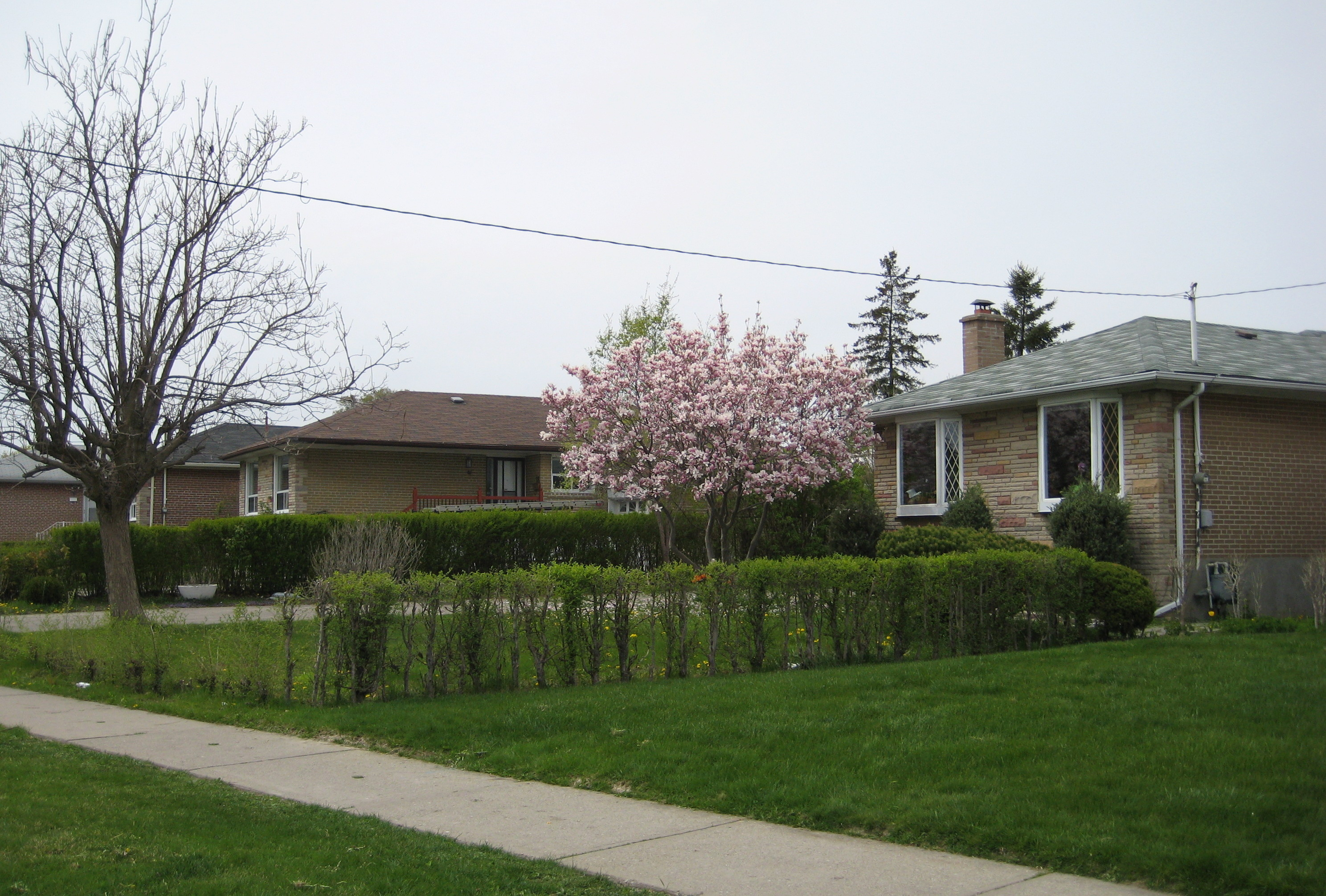
- Residences in Rexdale
- Location of Rexdale within Toronto
- Coordinates: 43°43′19″N 79°34′19″W
- Country: Canada
- Province: Ontario
- City: Toronto
- Community: Etobicoke-York
- Changed Municipality: 1998 (Toronto from Etobicoke)

Government
  - MP: John Zerucelli (Etobicoke North)
  - MPP: Doug Ford (Etobicoke North)
  - Councillor: Vincent Crisanti (Ward 1 Etobicoke North)

Rexdale is a neighbourhood of Toronto, Ontario, Canada, located north-west of the central core, in the district of Etobicoke. Rexdale defines an area of several official neighbourhoods north of Highway 401 and east of Highway 427. Rexdale was originally a post-World War II residential development within Etobicoke, and today is applied to a general area from Malton and Toronto Pearson International Airport in the City of Mississauga to the west, Highway 401 to the south, Steeles Avenue to the north, and the Humber River to the east. It is centered on Rexdale Boulevard and Islington Avenue.

== Character ==
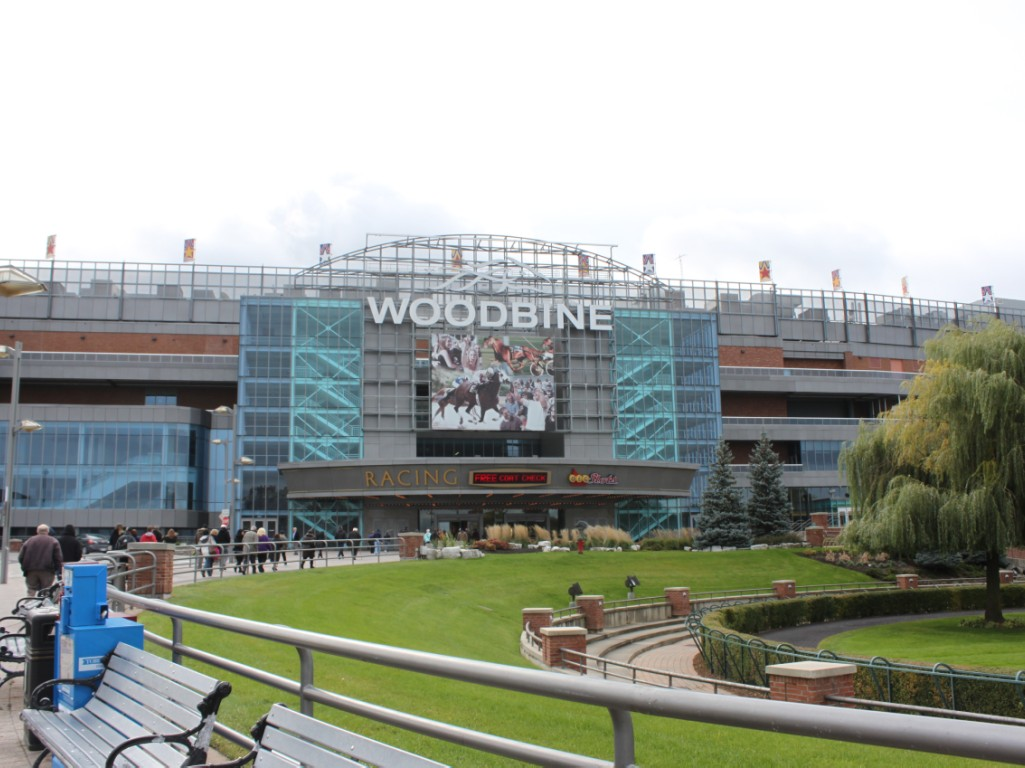
Woodbine Racetrack in Rexdale

Neighbourhoods in Rexdale include:

- The Elms
- Humberwood
- Smithfield
- Thistletown

Institutions and attractions located in Rexdale include the Canadian Standards Association, Toronto Congress Centre, Woodbine Centre, and Woodbine Racetrack.

== History ==
Rexdale was named after local real estate developer Rex Heslop, who purchased farmland in the area in 1955 for a cost of $110,000, and installed water mains, streets and sewers, as well as houses that listed for sale at either $9,000 or $10,000. The homes sold well, and soon 330 families were living in the development. In 1956, Heslop opened the Rexdale Plaza (once home to Eaton's and also Towers Department Stores and since demolished and replaced by a power centre). By then, 70 industries and 3,600 homes were located in Rexdale.

Rexdale's first residents were mostly English, Scottish, and Italian, but it evolved into a multicultural neighbourhood in the following decades, led by those from the Caribbean and the Indian subcontinent. The population of Rexdale, according to the 2006 census, is 94,469 living in 30,238 households. The population grows at a rate comparable to surrounding communities.

In 2006, Christopher Hume, a journalist with the Toronto Star, wrote that Rexdale "has become shorthand for suburban blight, social breakdown and gang violence. In 2005 alone, five young men were shot dead in the area, a grey landscape of highways and highrises, shopping malls and churches." Hume wrote that children who lived in Rexdale had nothing to do, and were "wandering around the anonymous streets of this place". The vision of Rexdale's planners, Hume wrote, was a patchwork of separate precincts for working, living, shopping and playing, connected by expressways. However, this single-use zoning, separation, industrial-scale development and reliance on cars contributed to Rexdale's problems. Joyce Lau of the South China Morning Post stated in 2015 that in Rexdale "other immigrants live in poverty, surrounded by crime."

In 2006, Toronto Police conducted a gang sweep, apprehending 106 alleged members of The Jamestown Crew, "a violent street gang that spreads violence, chaos and drugs in Rexdale".

== Education ==
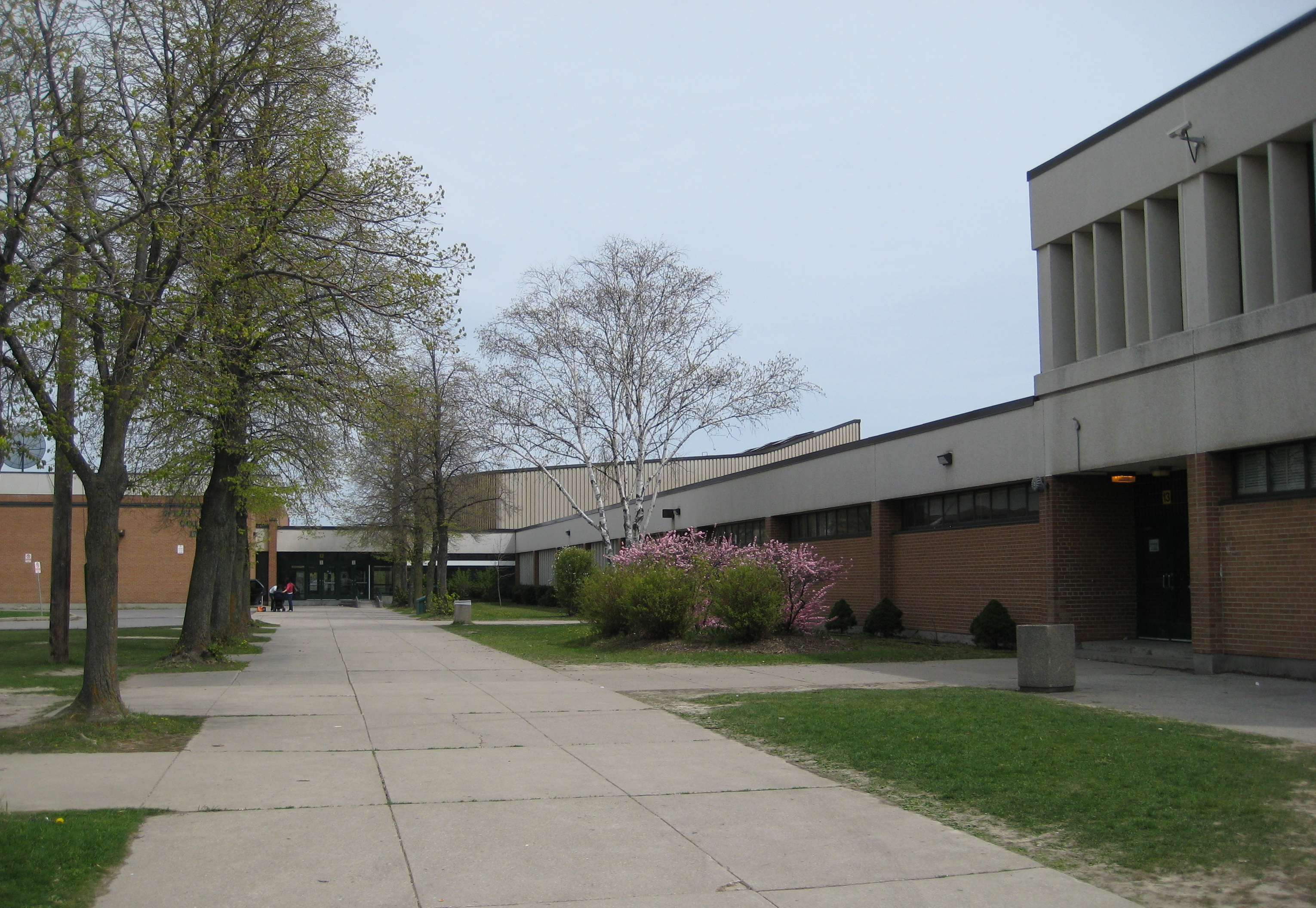
West Humber Collegiate Institute is one of several public secondary schools in the area.

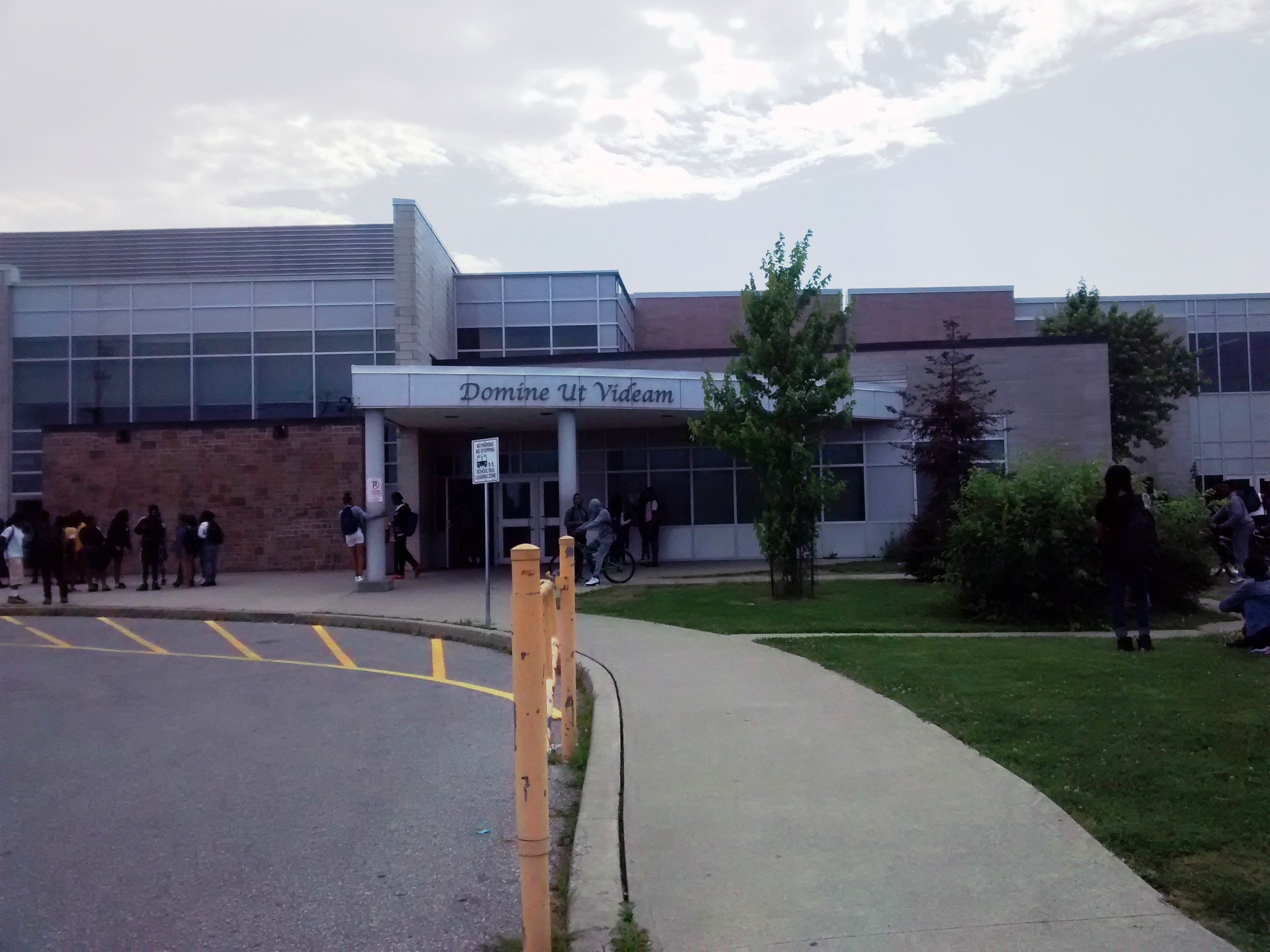
Father Henry Carr Catholic Secondary School is one of several public separate secondary schools in the area. This building was built in 1966 as Humbergrove Secondary School.

Notable schools located in Rexdale include:

Toronto District School Board:

- North Albion Collegiate Institute
- Thistletown Collegiate Institute
- West Humber Collegiate Institute
- Humbergrove Secondary School (defunct, now occupied by the TCDSB – see below)
- Elmbank Junior Middle Academy
- Melody Village Junior Public School

Toronto Catholic District School Board:

- St. Andrew Catholic School
- Father Henry Carr Catholic Secondary School
- Monsignor Percy Johnson Catholic Secondary School
- Don Bosco Catholic Secondary School, now closed
- Marian Academy, now closed, was located in Rexdale, within an area that, in 2001, was the poorest area of Rexdale.

The North Campus of Humber College is located within Rexdale. The same campus also hosts the University of Guelph-Humber, a post-secondary institution operated by Humber College, and the University of Guelph. The Rexdale branch of the Toronto Public Library is located in the area.

== Notable people ==
- Dalano Banton, professional basketball player
- Carlo Colaiacovo, professional hockey player
- Ghetto Concept, hip hop group
- Dave Huntley, former professional lacrosse player
- Infinite, hip hop musician
- Jelleestone, hip hop musician
- K'naan, hip hop musician
- King Bach, actor, comedian, and director
- Dean McDermott, actor and producer
- Bruce McDonald, film and television director
- NAV, hip hop recording artist and record producer
- Colin Patterson, professional hockey player
- Vera Peters, oncologist and clinical investigator
- Pvrx, hip hop musician
- Rheostatics, rock band
- Spek Won, hip hop musician
- Jordan Subban, professional hockey player
- Malcolm Subban, professional hockey player
- P. K. Subban, professional hockey player

== In popular culture ==
In 2006, Rexdale was the setting of the TV movie Doomstown. The youth TV series How to Be Indie took place in Rexdale.
