= Scarlett Heights Entrepreneurial Academy =

Coordinates: 43.689530°N 79.531381°W

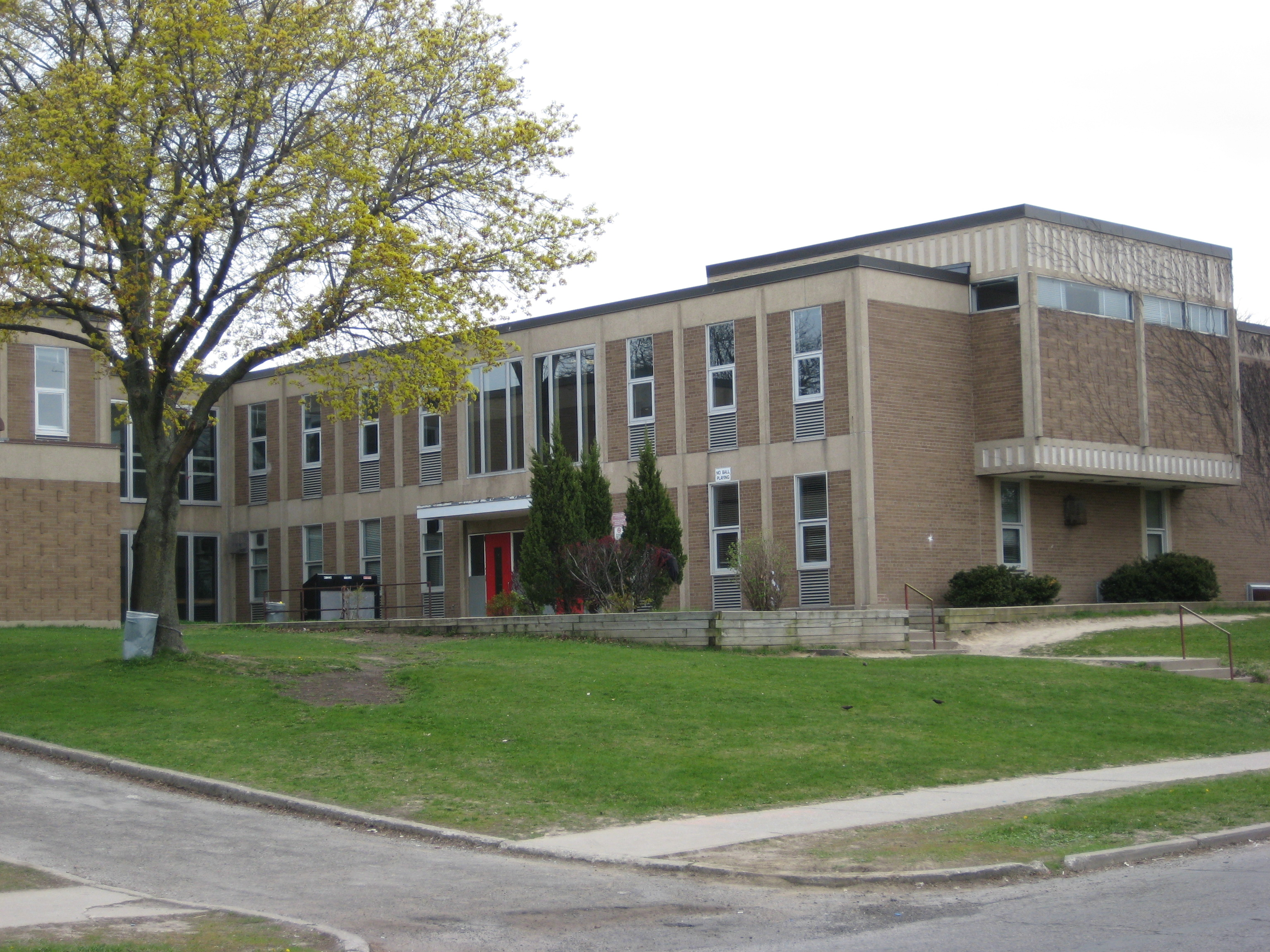

Location
- 15 Trehorne Drive; Toronto, Ontario, M9P 1N8; Canada

Information
- School type: Public High school
- Founded: 1963
- Closed: 2018
- School board: Toronto Catholic District School Board (Note: This school originally belonged to the Etobicoke Board of Education before it was merged into the Toronto District School Board in 1998.)
- Principal: Rizwana Jafri
- Grades: 9 to 12
- Enrolment: 230
- Language: English
- Team name: MNF
- Website: schools.tdsb.on.ca/shea/

Scarlett Heights Entrepreneurial Academy, formerly known as Scarlett Heights Collegiate Institute is a Toronto Catholic District School Board facility that serves as a vacant secondary school located in the Etobicoke district of Toronto, Ontario, Canada.

Opened in 1963 by the Etobicoke Board of Education, this school was broadened through a Student Leadership Development Program, which extends the base curriculum. This school was transferred to the new Toronto District School Board in 1998 and the school was closed in June 2018 due to low enrolment. After its closure, this school facility was used to temporarily accommodate students from York Memorial Collegiate Institute.

== History and overview ==
=== Origins ===
Scarlett refers to John Scarlett, an early land owner and entrepreneur in the area. The school was originally constructed in 1962 under its working name, Hilltop Collegiate Institute at the cost of $1,311,800 ($13.5 million in 2025 dollars) when the Etobicoke Board of Education approved the Hilltop application on December 19, 1961. The original design consisted of 9 standard classrooms, 1 art, 1 music, 3 science labs., a library, 1 home economics, 1 shop, 3 typing rooms, double gymnasium, cafeteria, secretarial, merchandising, accountancy, and business machines classrooms. Scarlett Heights Collegiate was opened by the Etobicoke Board of Education in September 1963. In 1998, Scarlett Heights was transferred to the new Toronto District School Board upon the dissolution of the EBE.

In the September 2006 issue of Toronto Life, Scarlett Heights was named "Best For Business" in the rating of the "10 Best Schools In Toronto". Students at Scarlett Heights are required to wear a uniform consisting of a white and grey shirt typically with the school's name imprinted on it; with black pants. Entrance to this academy requires students to demonstrate their commitment to a high academic achievement. Students wishing to apply for entrance complete an admissions portfolio, sign a learning contract, adhere to the Academy's uniform dress policy, and commit to a social responsibility component in the curriculum. Optional attendance students must have a minimum grade 8 average of 70% to be eligible for admission to the school.

Approximately 700 students attend Scarlett annually. Most students come from Rexdale, Mimico, Islington, Scarlett Manor, Scarlett Wood Court, Dixon, Fontenay Court, Richview, La Rose as well as other parts of Toronto. The school is served by many different TTC routes, including 73C Royal York, 52 Lawrence West, 58 Malton, 32 Eglinton West and 37 Islington. Like many other high schools, overcrowding on the buses does occur, especially the 73C northbound towards Rexdale.

The school contains a large gymnasium, a weight/fitness room, a library, a cafeteria, an auditorium, four full computer labs, two partial computer labs, an outdoor soccer field, basketball court and a newly paved jogging track, they also share a field with Hilltop Middle School.

The school is also known for holding many sporting events including tryouts for kids basketball teams like Etobicoke Thunder.

SHEA, along with most schools in Toronto, is an ethnically diverse school. The largest ethnic groups represented in the school include Somalis, Indians, Afghans, Serbs, and many others.

Feeder schools include Hilltop Middle School and Dixon Grove Junior Middle School.

=== Second life ===
Due to the fire at York Memorial Collegiate Institute on May 6, 2019, Scarlett Heights property is proposed to be used as a temporary home for York Memorial students beginning in the 2019–20 school year.

Effective September 2022, York Memorial merged with George Harvey High School. Currently, the property remains vacant and all banners covering the original name and the school sign was removed.

This school was fully acquired by the Toronto Catholic District School Board in October 2024 to house a secondary school following the closure of Don Bosco Catholic Secondary School in 2017. On November 15, 2024, the trustees rejected a proposal to relocate the student body of Bishop Allen Academy, which currently occupies the former Kingsmill Secondary School grounds since 1989, as its school is awaiting reconstruction due to overcapacity.

== Notable alumni ==
- Rob Ford, 64th Mayor of Toronto (December 1, 2010 – November 30, 2014).
- Doug Ford, Jr., 26th Premier of Ontario, Former Toronto City Councillor for Ward 2, Toronto

== In film ==
Some scenes for the movie Ginger Snaps (2000) and Scary Stories to Tell in the Dark (2019) were filmed at the school.

== See also ==
- List of high schools in Ontario
