= The Elms, Toronto =

The Elms
- Neighbourhood
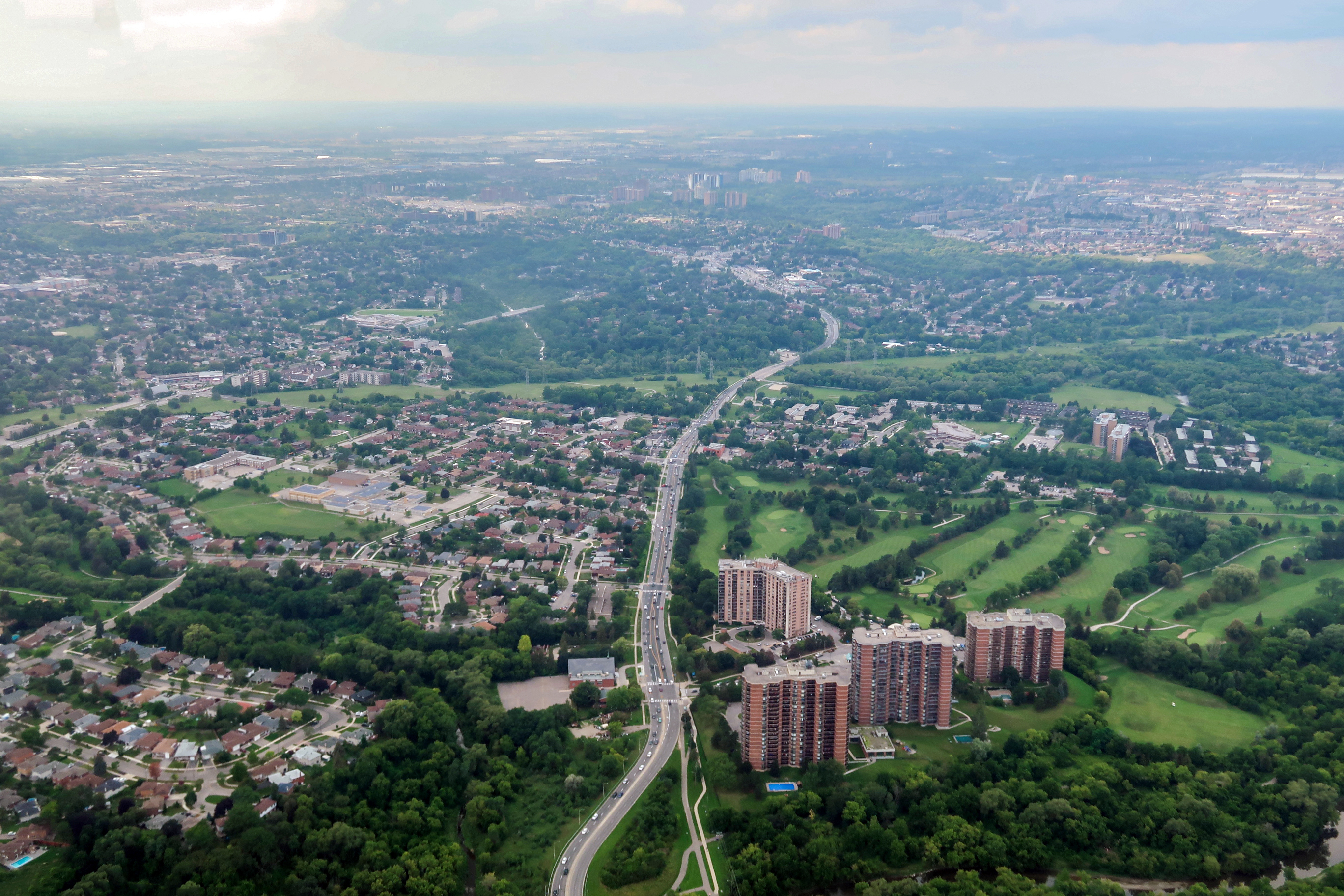
- Aerial view of The Elms in 2021

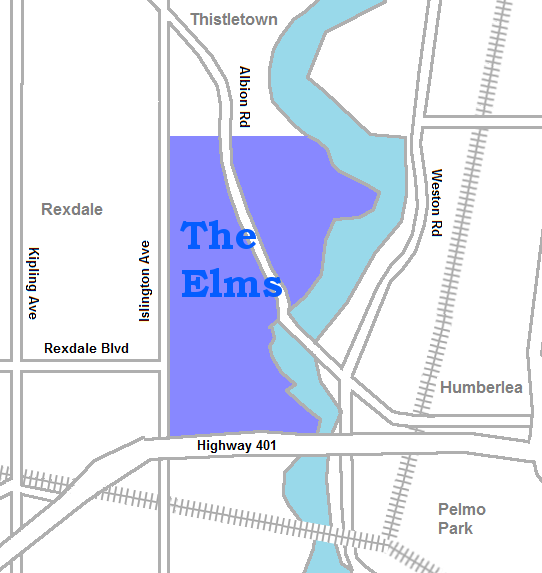
- Coordinates: 43°42′47″N 79°33′40″W
- Country: Canada
- Province: Ontario
- City: Toronto
- Community: Etobicoke-York
- Changed Municipality: 1998 Toronto from Etobicoke

Government
  - MP: John Zerucelli (Etobicoke North)
  - MPP: Doug Ford (Etobicoke North)
  - Councillor: Vincent Crisanti (Ward 1 Etobicoke North)

The Elms is a neighbourhood in Toronto, Ontario, Canada. It is bordered by the Humber River to the east, Islington Avenue to the west, Thistletown to the north, and Highway 401 to the south.

Much of this area was dotted with American elm trees, the namesake of The Elms golf course, in which its links were still being played as late as 1957 when Rexdale was growing around it. Pine Point Park is the community's main meeting place.

== History ==
The housing development of the original section of Rexdale, built in the early 1950s, is named for developer Rex Heslop and his wife Delma. These are single storey and storey and a half bungalows, bordered by streets Allenby Avenue, Burrard Road and Hadrian Drive, east of the new Wal-Mart store, formerly the site of Rexdale Plaza. Many of the residents of this neighbourhood, were employed Avro Canada.

Heslop went on building houses west of Islington Avenue, around Clearbrooke Circle as well as an industrial section of Rexdale west of Kipling Avenue, before going to Georgetown, where he established the Delrex neighbourhood.

Residents of Rexdale did their shopping mostly in Weston, until Rexdale Plaza was built in 1957. At the same time, the semi-detached houses were built along Allenby and Burrard, followed by the construction of Bungalows north of Hadrian between Burrard and Elmlea School.

== Education ==
The Toronto District School Board and the Toronto Catholic District School Board operate the following elementary schools in The Elms:

- Braeburn Junior School - A small, culturally diverse public elementary school, located at 15 Tandridge Crescent. It is situated on the banks of the Humber River. The name of the school comes from two Scottish words - "brae" meaning hill and "burn" meaning stream. The crest shows a green hill with a stream flowing at the foot. A golden book represents the Book of Learning. Braeburn opened in 1969 as an open concept school.
- The Elms Junior Middle School
- Elmlea Junior School
- St Stephen Catholic Elementary School

In addition to public schools, the neighbourhood is also home to Timothy Christian School, a private school.

== Institutions ==
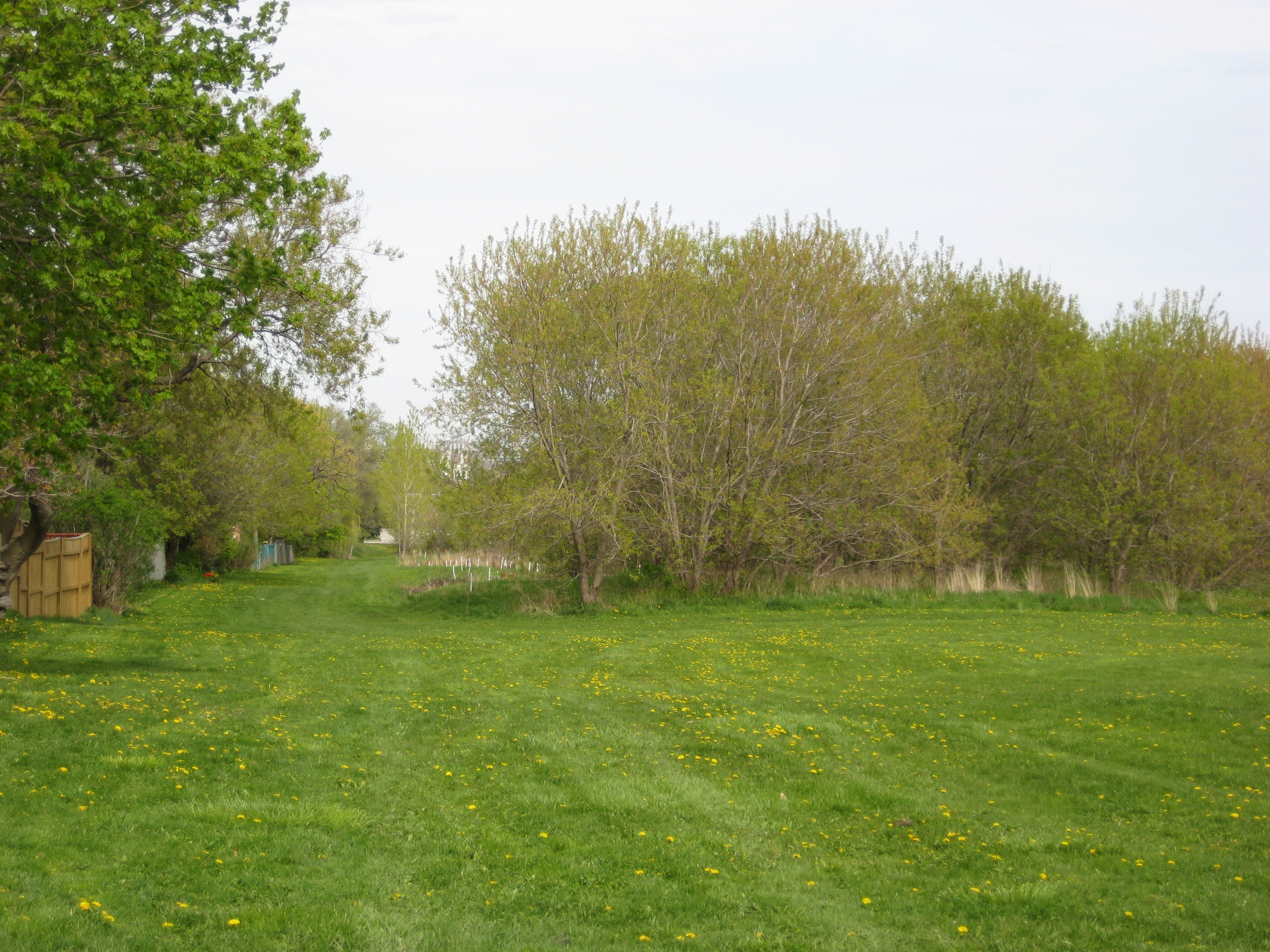
Pine Point Park is a municipal park located in The Elms.

- Rexdale Mall
- Northern Elms Public Library
- Rexlington Park
- The Elms Park
- Summerlea Park
- Walmart Supercentre

=== Churches ===
- St Paul's Anglican Church
- St Benedict's Church
- Rexdale Presbyterian Church
- Rexdale Alliance Church
- Rexdale Gospel Hall
- Sidh Shakti Babaji Mandir

== See also ==
- Rexdale
