= Ward 1 Etobicoke North =

Municipal council district in Toronto, Ontario, Canada

- Constituency for the Toronto City Council
- Location of Ward 1 in Toronto

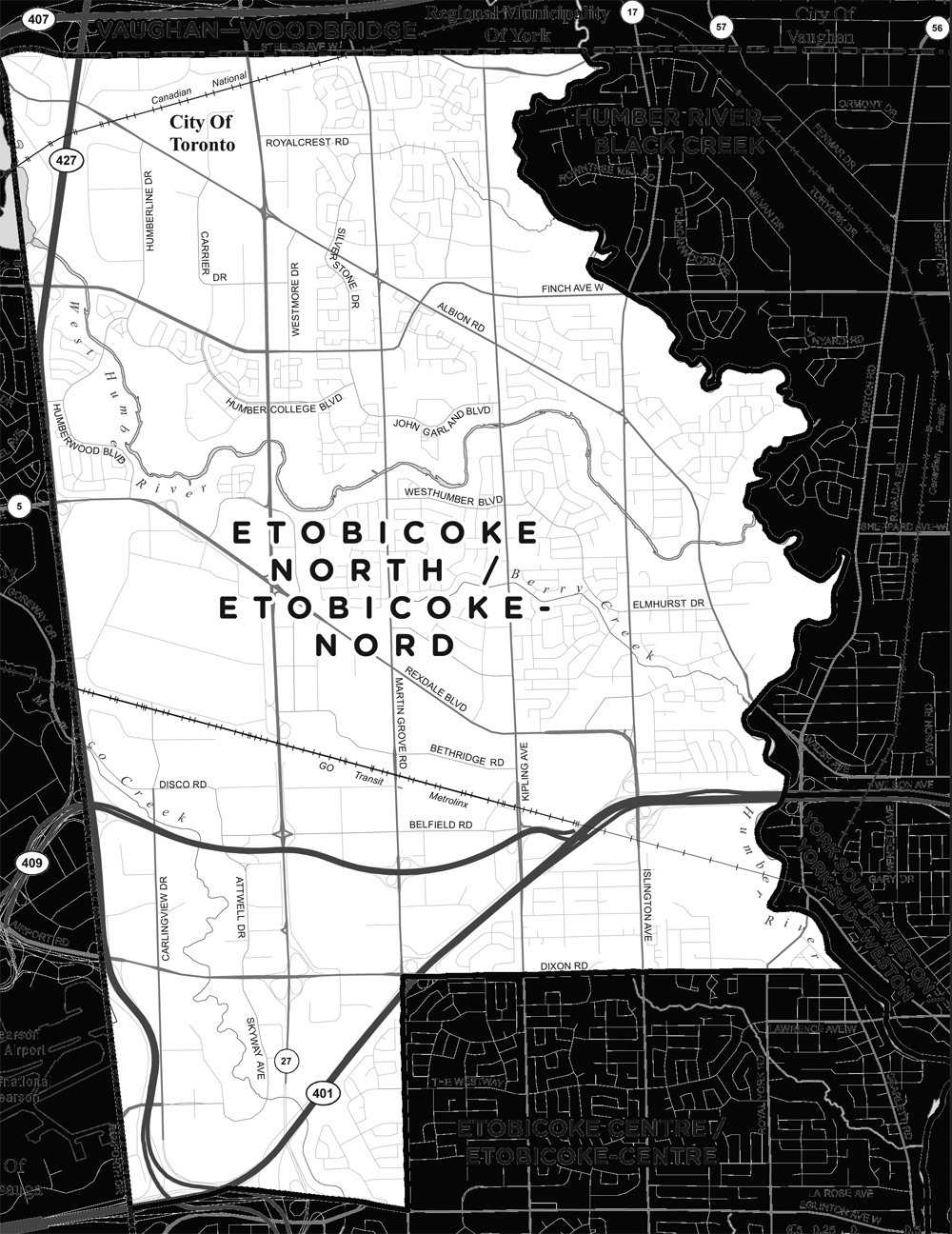
- Ward 1 Details
- City: Toronto
- Population: 118,040 (2016)

Current constituency
- Created: 2018
- Councillor: Vincent Crisanti
- Community council: Etobicoke/York
- Created from: Ward 1; Ward 2
- First contested: 2018 election
- Last contested: 2026 election
- Ward profile: www.toronto.ca/ward-1-etobicoke-north/

Ward 1 Etobicoke North is a municipal electoral division in Toronto, Ontario, Canada that has been represented in the Toronto City Council since the 2018 municipal election. It was last contested in 2026, with Vincent Crisanti being elected councillor.

== Boundaries ==
On August 14, 2018, the Government of Ontario redrew municipal boundaries via the Better Local Government Act, 2018, S.O. 2018, c. 11 - Bill 5. This means that the 25 provincial electoral districts and the 25 municipal wards in Toronto currently share the same geographic borders.

Defined in legislation as:

Consisting of that part of the City of Toronto described as follows: commencing at the intersection of the northerly limit of said city with the Humber River; thence generally southerly along said river to the easterly production of Dixon Road; thence westerly along said production and Dixon Road to Martin Grove Road; thence southerly along said road to Eglinton Avenue West; thence westerly along said avenue and Highway No. 427 to Highway No. 401; thence southwesterly along said highway to the westerly limit of the City of Toronto; thence northerly and easterly along the westerly and northerly limits of said city to the point of commencement.

== History ==
=== 2018 Boundary Adjustment ===
Toronto municipal ward boundaries were significantly modified in 2018 during the election campaign. Ultimately the new ward structure was used and later upheld by the Supreme Court of Canada in 2021.

=== 2022 municipal election ===
Michael Ford resigned his seat in June 2022, after winning election to the Legislative Assembly of Ontario in the 2022 provincial election. Vincent Crisanti, who finished second behind Ford in 2018, and who had held Ward 1 prior to the amalgamation of Wards 1 and 2 in 2018, was elected.

== Geography ==
Etobicoke North is part of the Etobicoke and York community council. The ward occupies the northwestern part of Toronto. The eastern boundary is the Humber River from Steeles Avenue south to a point just to the east of the Dixon Road. The southern boundary runs west from the Humber River along Dixon Road to Martin Grove Road to Eglinton Avenue to the western limit of the city. The western and northern limits of the ridings are formed by the city limits.

The ward contains the neighbourhoods of Rexdale, The Elms, Humberwood, Kingsview Village, Thistletown, and Willowridge.

== Councillors ==
Council term	Member	
Council term	Rexdale-Thistletown (Metro Council)	
1988–1991	Lois Griffin	
1991–1994	Lois Griffin	
1994–1997	Lois Griffin	
	Ward 5 Rexdale-Thistletown	
1997–2000	Elizabeth Brown, Bruce Sinclair	
	Ward 1 Etobicoke North	Ward 2 Etobicoke North
2000–2003	Suzan Hall	Rob Ford
2003–2006	Suzan Hall	Rob Ford
2006–2010	Suzan Hall	Rob Ford
2010–2014	Vincent Crisanti	Doug Ford
2014–2018	Vincent Crisanti	Rob Ford (until 2016); Michael Ford (from 2016)
	Ward 1 Etobicoke North	
2018–2022	Michael Ford (until June 2022)	
2018–2022	Rosemarie Bryan* (24 June 2022 only)	
2018–2022	Rose Milczyn (from August 2022)	
2022–2026	Vincent Crisanti	
2026–2030	Vincent Crisanti	

*Rosemarie Bryan was appointed on June 24 2022 to replace Michael Ford, but resigned after 5 hours and 40 minutes and was not sworn in.

== Election results ==
2026 Toronto municipal election

Candidate	Votes	%	minus
Vincent Crisanti (X)	12,804	45.51	4.44 ▲
Ala'a Adib	4,005	14.24	–
Chloe Brown	3,207	11.40	–
Kristian Santos	2,165	7.70	4.01 ▲
Saima Babar	1,475	5.24	–
Norman Hamilton	1,438	5.11	–
Hard Parmar	1,256	4.46	–
Joseph Martino	979	3.48	–
Nathen Masri	415	1.48	–
Abraham Abbey	389	1.38	0.34 ▼

2022 Toronto municipal election, Ward 1 Etobicoke North
Candidate	Vote	%
Vincent Crisanti	6,815	41.07
Avtar Minhas	3,409	20.54
Charles Ozzoude	1,023	6.16
Subhash Chand	934	5.63
Bill Britton	805	4.85
Michelle Garcia	620	3.74
Kristian Santos	613	3.69
Dev Narang	436	2.63
Ricardo Santos	421	2.54
Abraham Abbey	285	1.72
Keith Stephen	282	1.70
Christopher Noor	261	1.57
John Genser	198	1.19
Alistair Courtney	185	1.11
Mohit Sharma	185	1.11
Donald Pell	123	0.74

2018 Toronto municipal election, Ward 1 Etobicoke North
Candidate	Votes	Vote share
Michael Ford	10,648	42.26%
Vincent Crisanti	8,654	34.34%
Naiima Farah	2,262	8.98%
Shirish Patel	1,945	7.72%
Carol Royer	642	2.55%
Michelle Garcia	439	1.74%
Peter D'Gama	253	1.00%
Christopher Noor	214	0.85%
Gurinder Patri	142	0.56%
Total	25,199	100%
Source: City of Toronto

== See also ==
- Municipal elections in Canada
- Municipal government of Toronto
- List of Toronto municipal elections
