= Humberwood =

- Neighbourhood
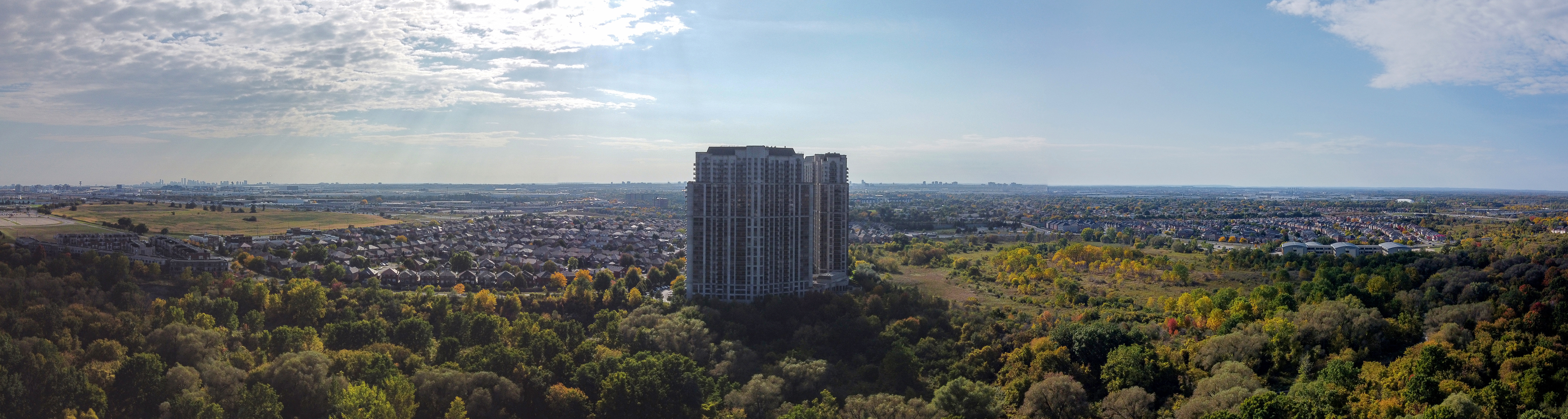
- Aerial view of Humberwood in 2023
- Country: Canada
- Province: Ontario
- City: Toronto
- Established: 1850 Etobicoke Township
- Changed municipality: 1998 Toronto from City of Etobicoke

Government
  - MP: John Zerucelli (Etobicoke North)
  - MPP: Doug Ford (Etobicoke North)
  - Councillor: Vincent Crisanti (Ward 1 Etobicoke North)

Humberwood is a neighbourhood in Toronto, Ontario, Canada. It is located north-west of the central core in the former suburb of Etobicoke within the larger neighbourhood of Rexdale. Humberwood is named after the Humber River, which flows along its northern edge. Humberwood is bound to the north by the Humber River western branch from Highway 427 east to Highway 27, Highway 27 south to Rexdale Boulevard, east on Rexdale Boulevard to Islington Avenue, south on Islington to Highway 401, and west along the 401 to Highway 427. It is the southern part of the official City of Toronto "West Humber-Clairville" neighbourhood.

== Notable places ==
=== Humberwood Centre ===
At the landmark $23M Humberwood Centre in Toronto, Ontario, Canada, four owners (the Toronto Catholic District School Board, the Toronto District School Board, Toronto Parks and Recreation Services and the Toronto Public Library Board) share one integrated, mixed-use facility as business partners. The City of Toronto contributed the land and three Ontario ministries provided capital funding from an inter-ministerial pool of funds. Even the design team was a joint venture between two architectural firms. The facility is a 212,300-square-foot (19,720 m^{2}), three-storey building with two elementary schools, a public library, community centre, community hall and triple gymnasium. Humberwood centre consists of:

1. Holy Child Catholic School is one of 170 elementary schools within the Toronto Catholic District School Board. In a unique co-operative model, it shares the Humberwood Centre with Humberwood Downs Junior Middle Academy, Parks & Rec, Toronto Public Library and McCauley Child Development Centre.
2. Humberwood Downs Junior Middle Academy serves approximately 1100 students representing almost 50 different language groups. The school grounds are designed and operated as an extension of the Humber Arboretum and on-site activities respect and preserve the natural balance of this environment. In June 2008, the Ministry of Education accorded Humberwood Downs the recognition of being a 'School On The Move', one of 40 schools chosen in the Province of Ontario. This was a result of incremental improvement in testing scores, teacher growth, distributed leadership, and engaged staff, parents and students.
3. Humberwood Public Library offers visitors a children's section that includes both fiction and non-fiction. The library also contains a selection of large-print books, mostly fiction, but there is some non-fiction. In the foreign-language section visitors will find books in Chinese, Spanish, Hindi and Punjabi, as well as cassettes and videos.
4. Humberwood CC Parks & Rec
