= Bishop Allen Academy =

Secondary school in Toronto, Ontario, Canada

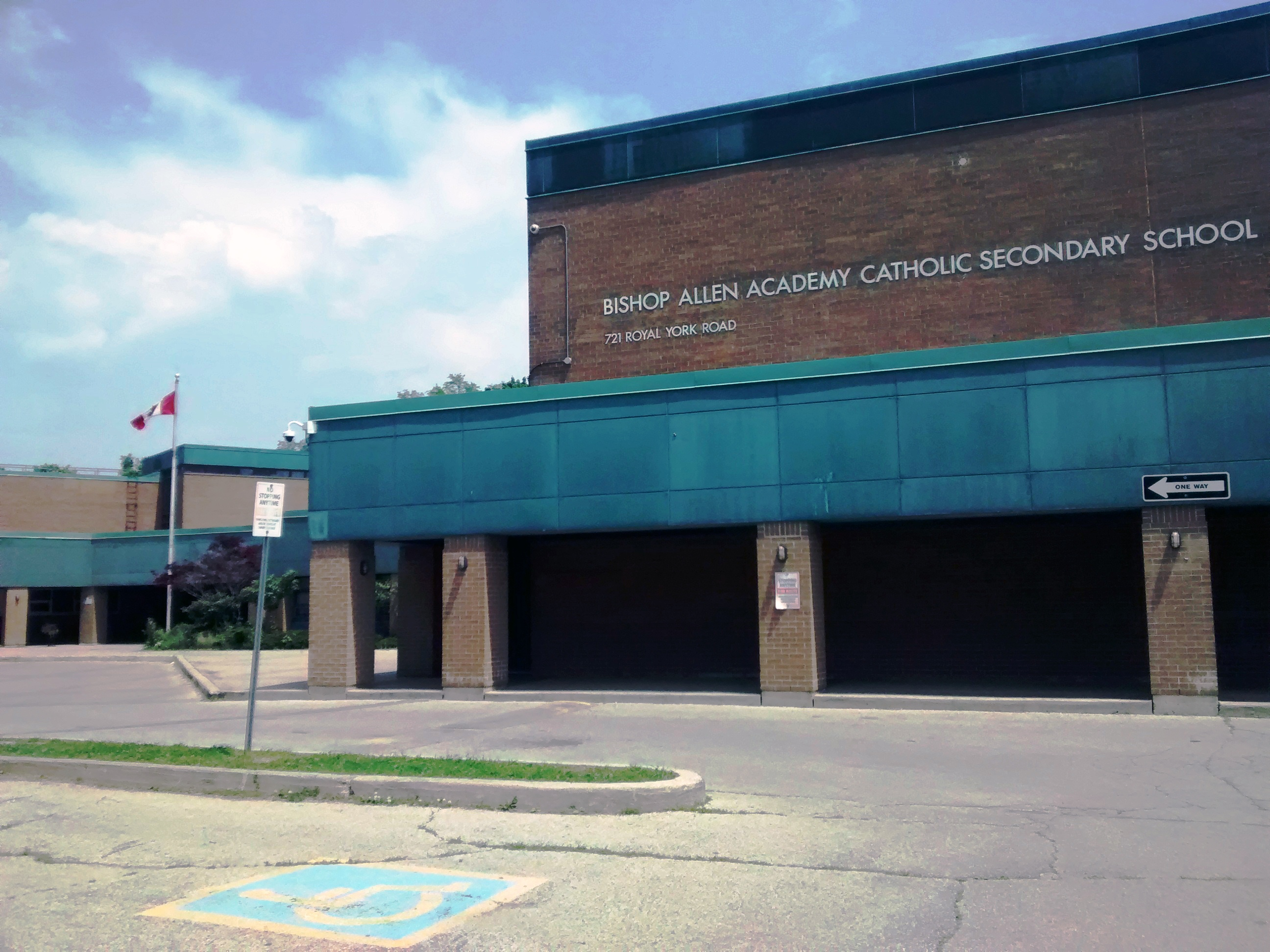

Location
- 2 St. Andrew's Boulevard; Toronto, Ontario, M9R 1V8; Canada; 43.702087°N 79.549924°W

Information
- Former name: Kingsmill Secondary School
- School type: Bill 30 Catholic High school
- Motto: Gaudete In Domino (Rejoice in the Lord)
- Religious affiliation: Roman Catholic
- Founded: 1989
- School board: Toronto Catholic District School Board (Metropolitan Separate School Board)
- Superintendent: Adalgisio Bria; Area 2
- Area trustee: Teresa Lubinski; Ward 4
- School number: 549 / 689360
- Principal: Anna Patejczuk
- CSPC Chairs (2019-20): Maria Borreca
- Staff: 120
- Grades: 9-12
- Enrolment: 1634 (2017-18)
- Language: English, French (French only mandatory for grade 9)
- Schedule type: Semestered
- Team name: Bishop Allen Cardinals
- Gym Uniform: Red Shirt, Black Shorts, And White
- Regular Uniform: Dark Grey Pants, Navy Blue Shirt, All Black Shoes
- Parish: St. Mark's
- Specialist High Skills Major: Justice, Community Safety and Emergency Services
- Program Focus: Advanced Placement; French Immersion; Gifted
- Website: bishopallen.tcdsb.org

Bishop Allen Academy; officially known as Bishop Allen Academy Catholic Secondary School (alternatively as Bishop Allen, Bishop Allen Academy CSS, BAA, BAACSS, BA, Allen), is a high school in Toronto, Ontario, Canada managed by the Toronto Catholic District School Board, formerly the Metropolitan Separate School Board. It is one of the board's 31 secondary schools and houses about 1643 students as of the 2017-18. The school building opened in 1963 as Kingsmill Secondary School (1963-1988) by the Etobicoke Board of Education, which later became the Toronto District School Board, and has leased the campus to the MSSB/TCDSB since 1989. It is located in the Queensway – Humber Bay neighbourhood of Etobicoke.

== History ==
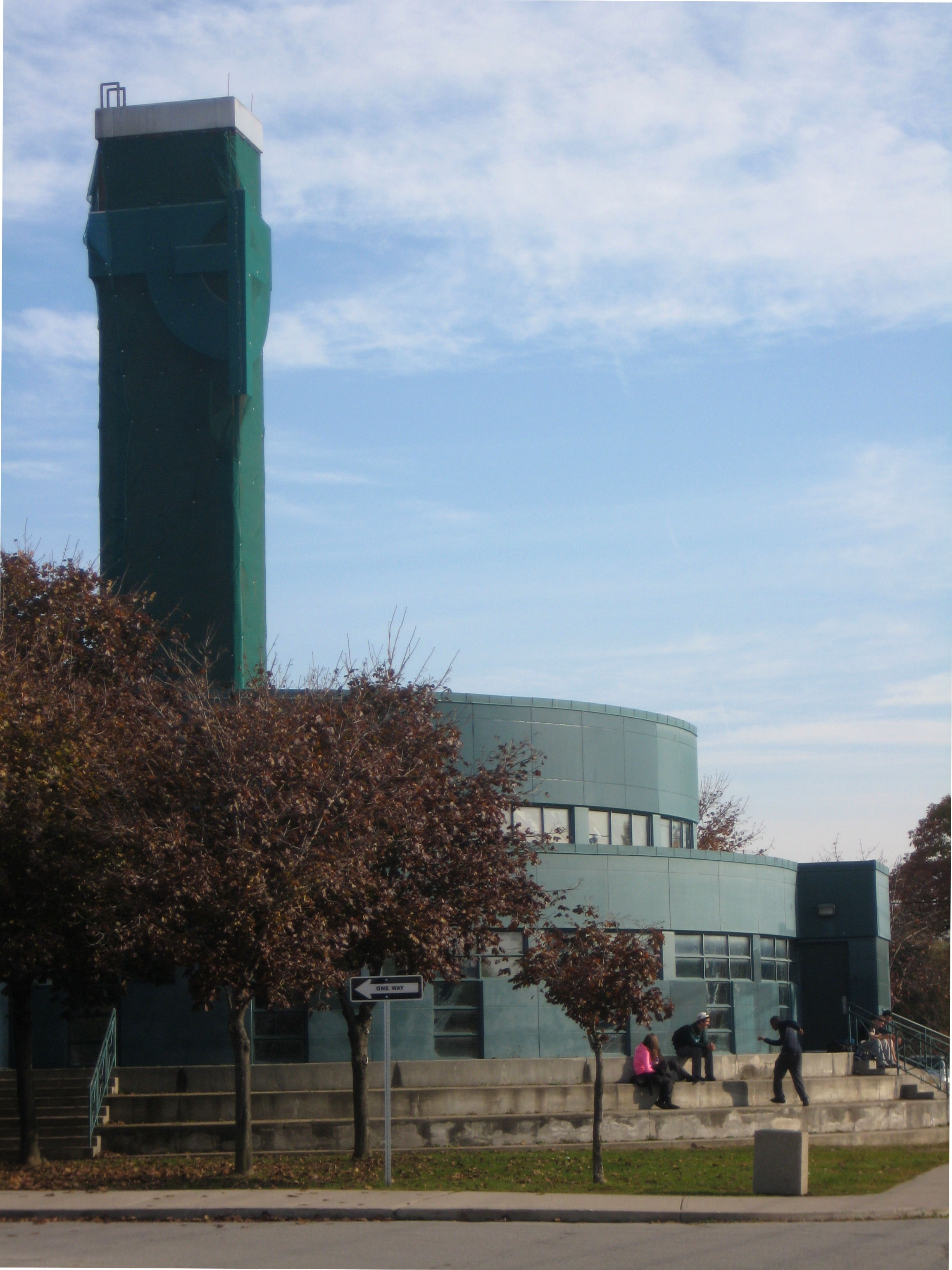
View of Bishop Allen's towers on the southern side.

The school was opened in October 1963 as Kingsmill Secondary School. During a period of reorganization of the Catholic school boards after the extension of full funding to Catholic secondary school, Kingsmill was one of three schools to be declared surplus by the Etobicoke Board of Education in June 1988 because of low enrolment and was transferred to the Metropolitan Separate School Board on July 1, 1988 which reopened the school a year later in September 1989 as Bishop Allen Academy. The original school was composed of 135 students under its founding principal Patrick Gravelle. The area had previously been served by Etobicoke's first Catholic secondary schools in Our Lady of Sorrows Parish; Michael Power school for boys and St. Joseph's, Islington for girls which, having combined, moved from the area in the 1990s. Before it opened, it was used at one point as the temporary home of De La Salle College for its 850 students in early 1989 because of the flood caused by student vandalism.

The school is named after Bishop Francis Allen, an auxiliary Bishop in the Archdiocese of Toronto and former pastor of local Etobicoke Parish Our Lady of Sorrows. Allen was instrumental, together with fellow Auxiliary Bishop Francis Marocco and Archbishop Philip Pocock, in the Archdiocese of Toronto's 1960s campaign to establish and enlarge Catholic secondary schools in the archdiocese.

With the former Kingsmill building built just for 717 students, the school has 30 portables on site to handle the growing student population. In 2008, health concerns about portables that contained mould forced Grade 10 students to relocate to the former St. Peter (now Monsignor Fraser College Annex) for one semester. The board installed three computer labs on that site.

The school is currently in a process of reconstruction with a replacement three-storey high school building. In November 2024, the TCDSB rejected the proposal to relocate its student body to the former Scarlett Heights Entrepreneurial Academy, which was acquired a month prior. Starting in the 2026-27 school year, the school has temporarily relocated to the site of the former Don Bosco Catholic Secondary School (originally Keiller Mackay Collegiate Institute) for the duration of rebuilding as the former Kingsmill campus is expected to be demolished.

== Notable alumni ==
- Jason Agnew, television producer, host, radio personality, and writer
- Nikki Benz, pornographic film actress
- Adam Pelech, Hockey player
- Justin Rutledge, singer-songwriter
- Jesse Zesseu, Paralympic athlete

== See also ==
- Education in Ontario
- List of secondary schools in Ontario
