= Paul Higgins (ice hockey) =

Canadian ice hockey player

- Born: January 13, 1962 (age 64) Saint John, New Brunswick, Canada
- Height: 6 ft 1 in (185 cm)
- Weight: 195 lb (88 kg; 13 st 13 lb)
- Position: Right wing
- Shot: Right
- Played for: Toronto Maple Leafs
- NHL draft: 200th overall, 1980; Toronto Maple Leafs
- Playing career: 1982–1984

Paul Higgins (born January 13, 1962) is a Canadian retired professional ice hockey right winger who played 25 games in the National Hockey League for the Toronto Maple Leafs during the 1981–82 and 1982–83 seasons.

== Early life ==
Higgins was born in Saint John, New Brunswick. As a student Father Henry Carr Catholic Secondary School in Toronto, he played on the Henry Carr Crusaders.

== Career ==
Higgins was selected in the 10th round of the 1980 NHL Draft and played for Toronto in the 1981–82 and 1982–83 seasons. His only appearance in the postseason was a single game in 1982–83 against the Minnesota North Stars in game four of the Norris Division Semi-Finals at Maple Leaf Gardens. Higgins dressed in favour of the injured Jim Korn. His primary role in hockey was as a fighter and he was compared to the likes of Tiger Williams. In the 25 NHL regular season games that Higgins played, he did not collect a single point but was assessed 152 minutes in penalties.

== Career statistics ==
=== Regular season and playoffs ===
			Regular season					Playoffs
Season	Team	League	GP	G	A	Pts	PIM	GP	G	A	Pts	PIM
1979–80	Father Henry Carr Catholic Secondary School	HS-ON	36	25	38	63	—	—	—	—	—	—
1980–81	Toronto Marlboros	OHL	46	4	4	8	178	5	0	0	0	52
1981–82	Toronto Maple Leafs	NHL	3	0	0	0	17	—	—	—	—	—
1981–82	Toronto Marlboros	OHL	6	0	0	0	11	—	—	—	—	—
1981–82	Kitchener Rangers	OHL	29	3	5	8	119	—	—	—	—	—
1982–83	Toronto Maple Leafs	NHL	22	0	0	0	135	1	0	0	0	0
1983–84	Carolina Thunderbirds	ACHL	4	0	1	1	18	—	—	—	—	—
NHL totals			26	0	0	0	152	1	0	0	0	0
