= Marian Academy (Toronto) =

Catholic high school in Toronto, Ontario, Canada

Marian Academy (Father Henry Carr West)
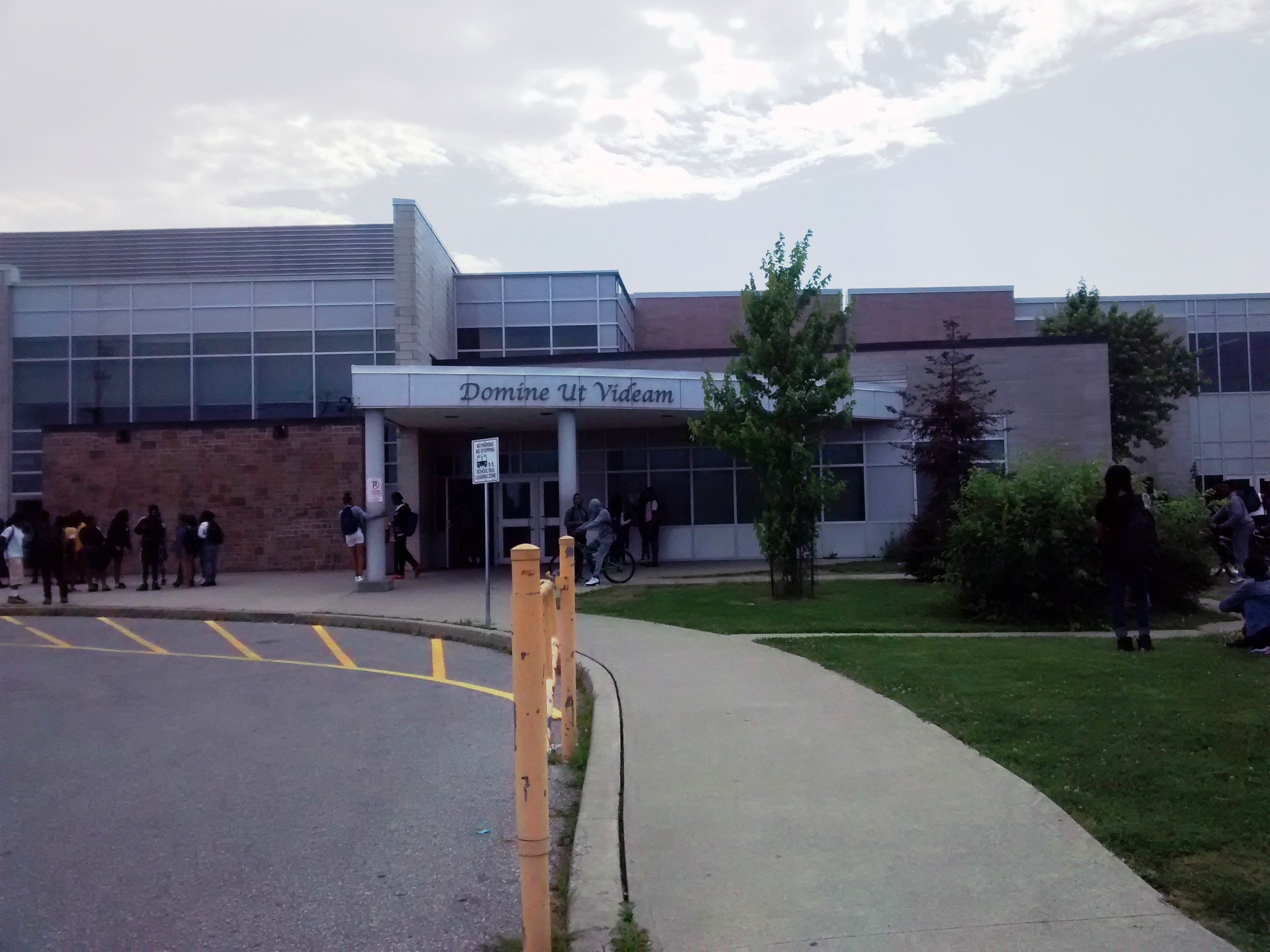

Location
- 1760 Martin Grove Road; Toronto, Ontario, M9V 3S4; Canada; 43.73582°N 79.59214°W

Information
- School type: Bill 30 Catholic High school
- Motto: Speciosa facta es (You have been made beautiful.)
- Religious affiliations: Roman Catholic (Holy Ghost Fathers)
- Founded: 1988
- Status: Building occupied by Father Henry Carr
- Closed: 2002
- School board: Toronto Catholic District School Board (Metropolitan Separate School Board)
- Superintendent: Loretta Notten; Area 1
- Area trustee: Peter Jakocvic; Ward 1
- School number: 548 / 734950
- Principal: Phil Prospero
- Grades: 9-13
- Enrollment: 592 (2001-02)
- Language: English
- Colours: Navy Blue and Grey
- Team name: Marian Mustangs
- Parish: St. Andrew's
- Website: www.tcdsb.on.ca/schools/marianacademy.html

Marian Academy, formally known as Marian Academy Catholic Secondary School (also called Marian Academy CSS, MACSS, MA, Marian) is a Toronto Catholic District School Board facility housed in the former Humbergrove Secondary School in Toronto, Ontario, Canada. Located in the Rexdale area of the former suburb of Etobicoke, this school existed from September 1988 until June 2002. By 2001, the portion of Rexdale containing the school was the poorest part of the neighborhood.

== Closure ==
The closing of Marian was done in order for the school board to receive additional grants from the provincial government of Ontario. Those grants would be used to rebuild Henry Carr and Monsignor Johnson. Royson wrote that "Students will have better facilities, though further away." Despite the reputation of the area of Rexdale where the school was located, the students and parents of the school said that Marian was a good school. Many students indicated that they would drop out of Marian instead of attending the new Carr.

== Converting 2 Gas-Powered Cars to Electrical Power in the 90s ==
Students in Nick Lacoppola's automotive technology class at Marian Academy successfully converted two gas-powered cars to electrical power in the mid 90s. The students designed and built their own parts as part of this after-hours project. The school sent a car to the 1995 APS-500 electric car race, along with 3D AutoCAD modelling created by a student who would later become a well-known cloud computing expert, and the students were featured in a video on how to build an electric car. Nick Lacoppola was awarded a teaching excellence award for his work by Canada's Prime Minister.

== Notable alumni ==
- Nadia L. Hohn - Author

== See also ==
- List of high schools in Ontario
