= Suzan Hall =

Rita hayward

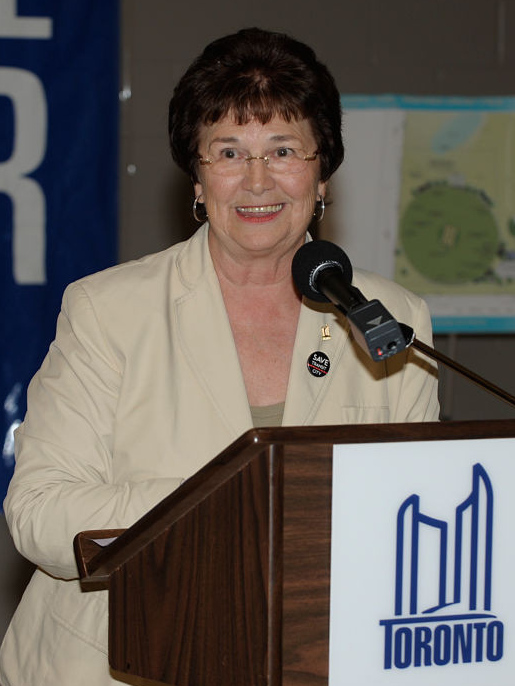
- Hall in 2010

Toronto City Councillor for (Ward 1) Etobicoke North
- In office December 1, 2000 – December 1, 2010
- Preceded by: Bruce Sinclair
- Succeeded by: Vincent Crisanti

Personal details
- Spouse: Barry
- Children: 2

Suzan Hall is a Toronto politician, best known for her role as city councillor in Toronto for Ward 1 Etobicoke North. A longtime resident of Etobicoke, she originally entered politics as a school board trustee. She eventually became chair of the Etobicoke Board of Education. With the creation of the new city of Toronto, she moved to become vice-chair of the Toronto District School Board. In the 2000 Toronto municipal election, she defeated longtime incumbent Bruce Sinclair in a close race, finishing only 97 votes ahead of fellow challenger Vincent Crisanti. The 2003 election was again a close race between her and Crisanti. She lost the 2010 election to Crisanti.

== Election results ==
2010 Toronto election, Ward 1
Candidate	Votes	%
Vincent Crisanti	5,505	40.7
Suzan Hall	4,996	37.0
Omar Farouk	1,573	11.6
Sharad Sharma	883	6.5
Ted Berger	388	2.9
Peter D'Gama	169	1.3
Total	13,514	100

Unofficial results as of October 26, 2010 03:55 am

2006 Toronto election, Ward 1
Candidate	Votes	%
Suzan Hall	4,878	50.9
Sonali Verma	2,999	31.3
Anthony Caputo	490	5.1
Andre Lucas	467	4.9
Francis Ahinful	351	3.7
Ted Berger	186	1.9
Rosemarie Mulhall	129	1.3
Brian Prevost	79	0.8
