= Spek Won =

- Born: Benjamin Addy
- Origin: Rexdale, Ontario, Canada
- Genres: hip hop
- Occupation: rapper

Spek Won is the stage name of Benjamin Addy, a Canadian rapper. Born and raised in the Rexdale area of Toronto to immigrant parents from Ghana, he released his debut single "HipLife" in 2009 before following up with the mixtape Preemo Donna in 2010. He subsequently joined the hip hop collective 88 Days of Fortune.

He released his second album, Sofa King Amazing, in 2015. The album became most noted for the single "Black Body", a reflection on recent incidents of police violence against young African-American men in both Canada and the United States. The video for "Black Body", directed by Mark Valino, was a longlisted nominee for the 2016 Prism Prize.

He is the partner of R&B singer Shi Wisdom.

== Discography ==
- Preemo Donna (2010)
- Sofa King Amazing (2015)
