= Rex Heslop =

Rex Wesley Heslop (1905 – September 30, 1973) was a Canadian businessman noted for being a land developer and residential real estate developer.

== Biography ==
=== Early years ===
Heslop was born on a farm in Etobicoke, Ontario. The property would have been located North of the 401 and East of Islington Avenue—note that neither road existed in 1905.

He worked with his father in the family construction business before moving to Detroit to seek opportunity. In Detroit, he drove a cab for a time; then he became a new car salesman. After his tenure in Detroit, he went to Northern Ontario, working in the mines, until he was injured in a rock slide at which point he moved back to Toronto to work in construction.

Heslop was married and had two children.

=== Early Southern Etobicoke Developments ===
Heslop returned to Toronto. There was a major housing shortage with the veterans coming home from WW2. About 1947–48, he acquired a small piece of land on the southeast corner of Foch and Horner Ave. across from Sir Adam Beck Public School. On this property, he built three houses using a precast concrete wall system. They sold immediately.

About 1949, he purchased the west half of a farm on the north side of Horner Ave., west of, but not connected to Brown's Line. It was subdivided into lots approximately 40 feet by 140 feet in size, and in five locations he designed L-shaped the streets. He built a mixture of homes, brick and precast concrete, bungalows and story-and-halves, two, three and four bedrooms. It was very rare for the Toronto area at that time to find a subdivision that was not on perfectly straight streets and where all the houses were not identical to each other. Street names were all English locations like Chelsea Dr., Fulham Dr., Norfolk Dr., etc., except for one street called Heslop Dr.

From the major success of that development, Heslop moved on by buying the east half of the same farm, including the old farmhouse (renovated and located on east side of Radlett Ave.). He repeated the development formula of the first phase, incorporating three more L-shaped streets, but no longer offering the four-bedroom house models. A couple of streets now connected both subdivisions to Brown's Line. The longest north–south street is called Delma Dr., his wife's first name.

Land from both subdivisions was incorporated into one large park, bounded by Delma, Mitcham, Fulham and Eltham that Heslop gave to Etobicoke. Later, the municipality sectioned off the most easterly part of that park and sold it to Alderwood United Church for their new building in the early 1950s.

=== Creating Rexdale, Ontario ===
In 1955 Heslop purchased farmland again, this time in the northern part of Etobicoke known at the time as Thistletown for a cost of $110,000. Water mains, streets and sewers were constructed, as well as houses which were listed for sale at either $9,000 or $10,000. The homes sold well, and soon 330 families were living in the development named "Rexdale". In 1956, Heslop opened the Rexdale Shopping Centre (now Rexdale Mall). By then, 70 industries and 3,600 homes were located in Rexdale.

=== Building the Delrex subdivision in Georgetown ===
Heslop, the developer of Rexdale in Etobicoke, had purchased several farms on Georgetown's eastern boundary in 1954. By 1958, he and his wife Delma and their two children - Marilyn and Rex Jr. - had moved into their brand new spacious home on Heslop Court.

Heslop then tried a similar venture to Rexdale, but this time in Georgetown by creating another subdivision, this one called Delrex. He ran into political problems and tired of name-calling and in-fighting, sold his interest and retired at the age of 61.

=== Legacy ===
Rexdale, Ontario and the Delrex subdivision (area south of Highway 7 between Maple Avenue and Mountainview Road South) of Georgetown, Ontario are named after him. Various streets in Delrex named after him and his family (i.e. Rexway Drive, Heslop Court, Delrex Boulevard, Marilyn Crescent).
