= Don Bosco Catholic Secondary School =

Former Catholic high school in Toronto, Ontario, Canada

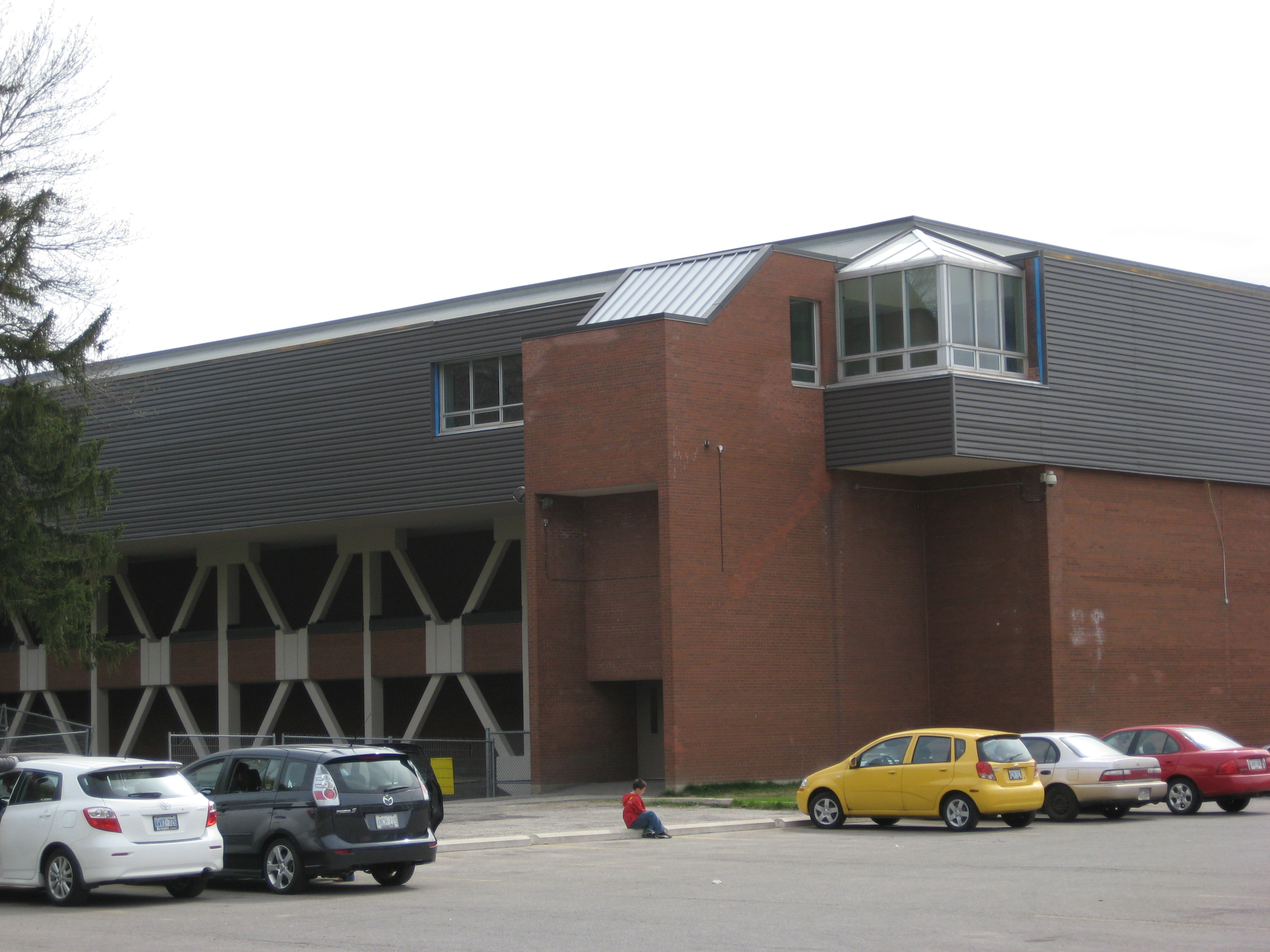

Location
- 2 St. Andrew's Boulevard; Toronto, Ontario, M9R 1V8; Canada; 43.702087°N 79.549924°W

Information
- School type: Catholic high school
- Motto: Crescamus in Christum (Let us Grow in Christ)
- Founded: 1978
- Closed: 2017
- School board: Toronto Catholic District School Board
- Superintendent: Loretta Notten; Area 1
- Area trustee: Joseph Martino; Ward 1
- School number: 525 / 703184
- Principal: Michael Rossetti
- Grades: 12
- Enrollment: 97 (2016-17)
- Language: English
- Schedule type: Semestered
- Colours: Green and gold
- Slogan: Reason, Religion, and Kindness
- Team name: Bosco Eagles
- Parish: Transfiguration
- Specialist High Skills Major: Hospitality & Tourism; Non-Profit
- Program Focus: Broad-based Technology; Gifted; Advanced Placement; Global Education; Self-Directed Learning

Don Bosco Catholic Secondary School (also called Don Bosco, Don Bosco CSS, DBCSS, Don Bosco Toronto, or simply Bosco) is a Toronto Catholic District School Board secondary school facility in the city of Toronto, Ontario, Canada. It is located in the former suburb of Etobicoke, north of the intersection of Islington Avenue and Dixon Road in the Kingsview Village neighbourhood.

The school was opened in 1978 by the Salesians of Don Bosco religious orders as Central Etobicoke's first Catholic high school. It moved into the former Keiller Mackay Collegiate Institute building, constructed and opened in 1971 by the Etobicoke Board of Education, in 1983. Don Bosco became fully publicly funded by the Metropolitan Separate School Board in 1987.

The board closed the school due to dwindling enrollment in 2017 and the building became the temporary home for the Toronto Argonauts practice facility, with a short-term lease of the facility from the TCDSB. Since its vacancy, the school building has been used as a temporary location for various Toronto Catholic District School Board high schools. Dante Alighieri Academy occupied the building starting in the 2021–22 school year, as its building was being reconstructed at the time. At the beginning of the 2026-27 school year, Bishop Allen Academy moved into the Don Bosco building, also due to reconstruction reasons. They are the current occupants of the campus.

In the school's later years, Don Bosco became famous for then-Mayor Rob Ford's football program.

== History ==
The school was named after Saint John Bosco.

From the 2000s to 2013, the school was known for having former Toronto mayor Rob Ford as its school coach.

In 2014, Don Bosco adopted a Self-Directed Learning program, similar to that of Mary Ward Catholic Secondary School in Scarborough, becoming only the second such school in the GTA and third in Ontario to do so. The school subsequently disbanded this method and returned to the regular class system.

== Sports ==
In the school's inaugural year, it took the midget girls' relay title in a competition.

=== Football program ===
The head coach of the school's football program, from 2002 to 2013, was Rob Ford, (affectionately known as "The F-150" by the school), the mayor of Toronto from 2010 to 2014. He had previously been a coach at Newtonbrook Secondary School, until a 2001 confrontation with a student.

The Canadian Taxpayers Federation lodged criticism against Ford for using city resources for the program. Two of Ford's summer football teams list two of Ford's city-paid special assistants as contacts, providing the numbers for their city-owned cellphones. Sources claimed Ford used a city car to ferry players to games and practices. Ford skipped 5 1/2 hours of a City executive committee meeting to attend a "pre-season jamboree" with his team, not telling his council allies.

Ford talked to Sun News Network about the program, how many students "come from gangs" and "broken homes", and without football would have "no reason to go to school". Some Don Bosco school staff sent an anonymous group letter to senior Catholic school board officials, decrying Ford's comments about the school to Sun News, calling them "no reflection of the real" school. The board launched an investigation about the comments. At a parent meeting, some attendees expressed concern that the school is too often called "Rob Ford's". In May 2013, the Toronto Star saw video of Ford calling the students "just f---ing minorities"; the school board refused to comment, having not seen the video. On May 22, the Toronto Catholic District School Board dismissed Ford from the coaching position.

One-time player Anthony Smith was murdered March 28, 2013. A photo of Smith with Ford was widely used as illustration during reportage of the alleged drug video. In June 2013, police conducted raids as part of Project Traveller; murder charges in this case were expected. Toronto Police Chief Bill Blair confirmed the existence of the video on October 31, 2013.

== See also ==
- List of high schools in Ontario
