= Kingsview Village =

- Neighbourhood
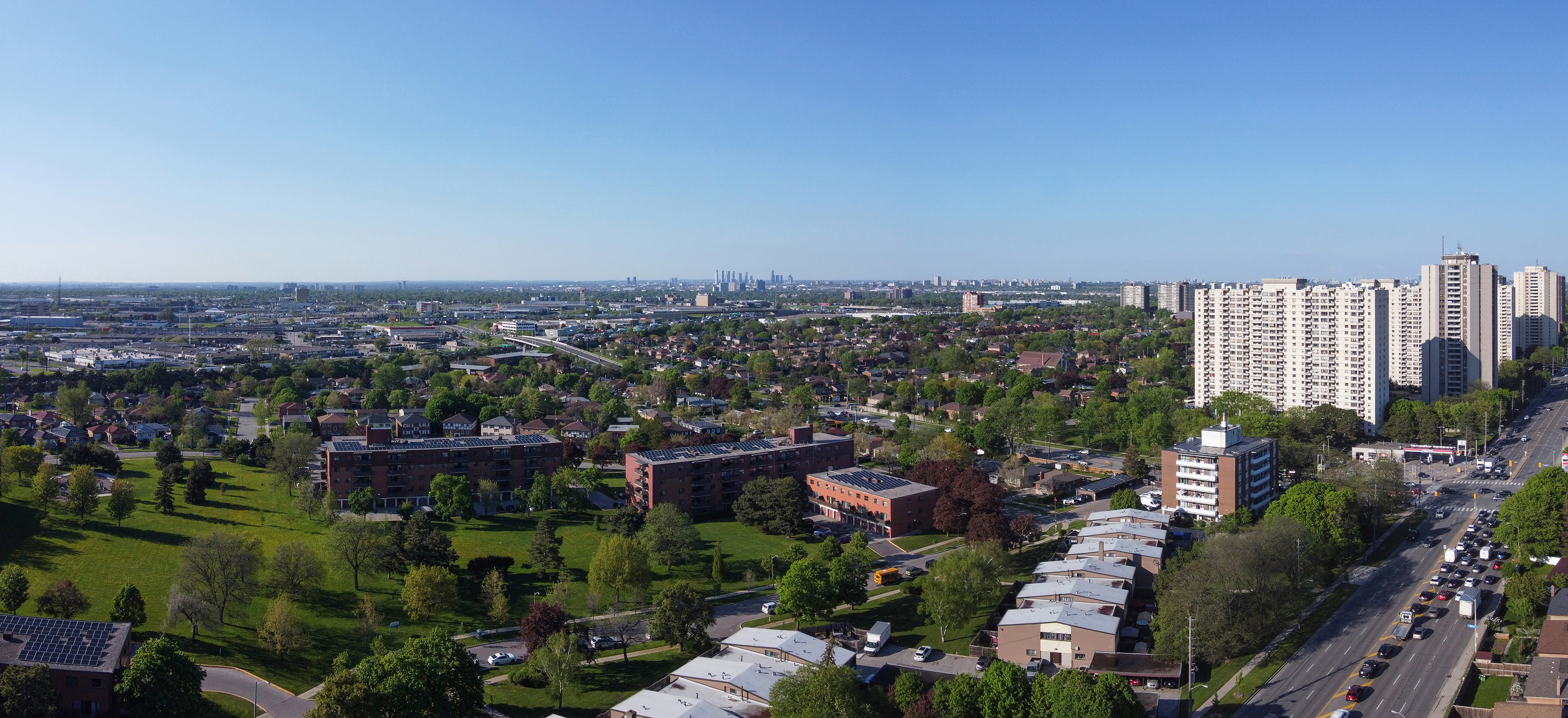
- Aerial view of Kingsview Village in 2025

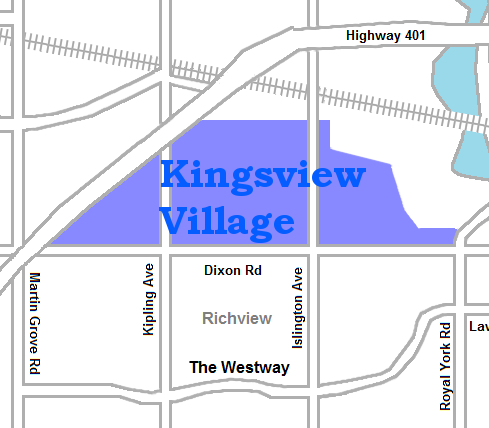
- Coordinates: 43°41′40″N 79°33′31″W
- Country: Canada
- Province: Ontario
- City: Toronto
- Established: 1850 Etobicoke Township
- Changed municipality: 1998 Toronto from City of Etobicoke

Government
  - MP: Kirsty Duncan (Etobicoke North)
  - MPP: Doug Ford (Etobicoke North)
  - Councillor: Vincent Crisanti (Ward 1 Etobicoke North)

Kingsview Village is a neighbourhood in the city of Toronto, Ontario, Canada. It is located in the north end of the former suburb of Etobicoke, and is bounded on the north by Highway 401, on the east by the Humber River and St. Phillips Road, on the south by Dixon Road. It is relatively close to Toronto Pearson International Airport in Mississauga, and TTC bus routes connect it to the rest of the city.

== Overview ==
This neighbourhood is home to a multicultural diverse community originally settled by people from the British Isles that contains among others, a sizable Somali population as well as Italian, Asian, South Asian cultures. Its denizens also practice a wide variety of religions, with Islam becoming more prevalent.

In many cases, single family homes built in the 1950s and 1960s have been demolished, their generous sized lots subdivided to allow up to three homes on a parcel of land where one initially stood. Smaller homes may be razed in favor of constructing a much larger home, in a trend known as "monster homes".

Kingsview is a name that was given to the residential development north of Dixon Road, in the 1950s, on the site of land owned by Ernest Byworth. The name 'Kingsview' is a reference to the neighbourhood's position on high ground. Kingsview Village is home to several parks (Blackfriar, Dixon, Fairhaven and Kingsview). The Free Methodist Kingsview Church and Westown Shopping Centre are also situated here.

== Education ==
Two public school boards operate elementary schools in the Kingsview Village, the secular Toronto District School Board (TDSB), and the separate school board, the Toronto Catholic District School Board (TCDSB). Elementary schools in Kingsview Village include:

- Kingsview Village Junior School is a public elementary school operated by TDSB. It is located close to the intersection of Dixon Road and Islington Avenue. Kingsview Village was opened on December 16, 1956.
- St Maurice Catholic Elementary School, is a public elementary separate school operated by TCDSB.
