= Humbergrove Secondary School =

Former public high school in Toronto, Ontario, Canada

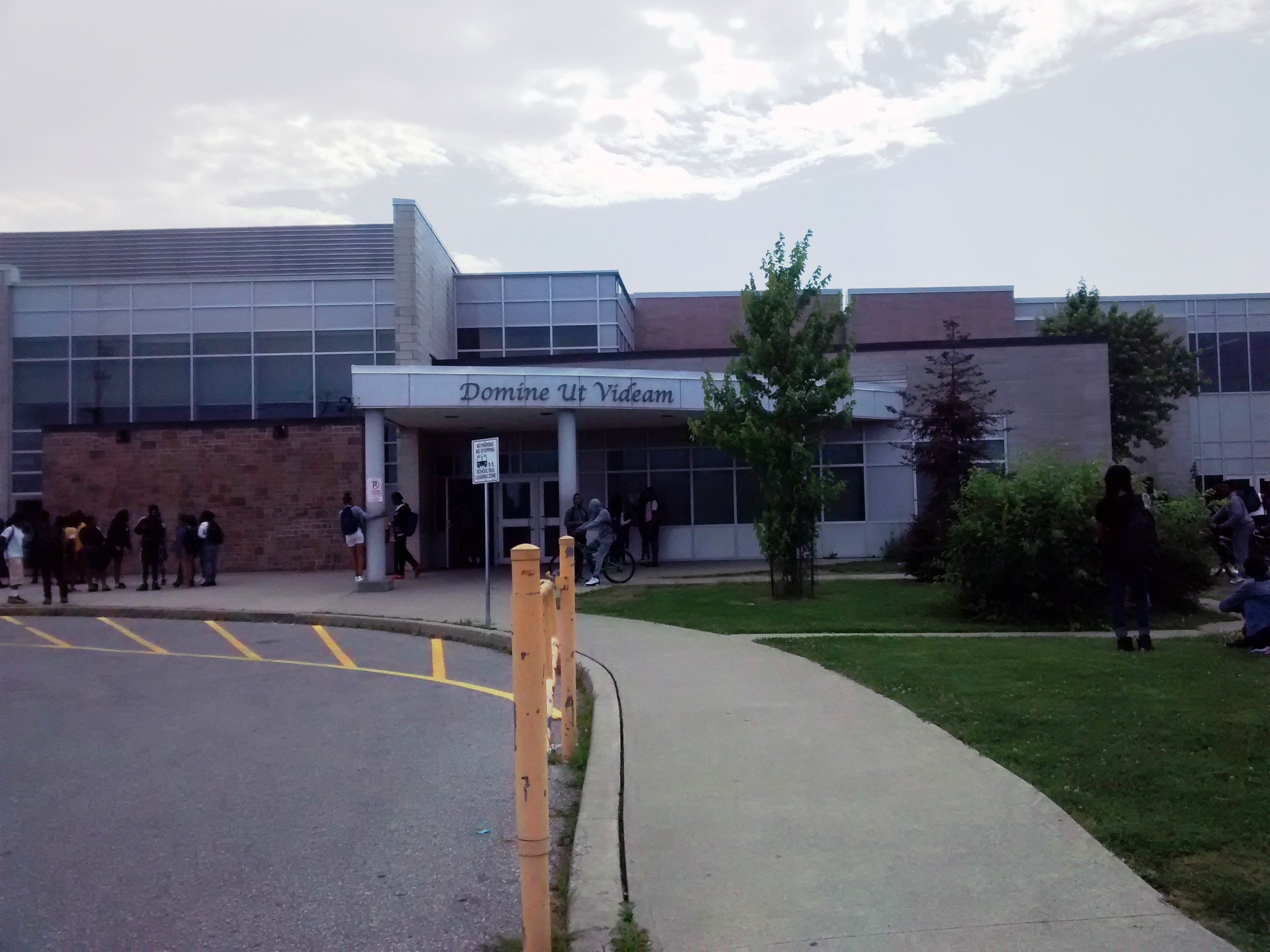

Location
- 1760 Martin Grove Road; Toronto, Ontario, M9V 3S4; Canada; 43°44′9″N 79°35′31″W

Information
- School type: Public High school Vocational High school
- Founded: 1966
- Status: Leased out
- Closed: 1988
- School board: Toronto District School Board (Etobicoke Board of Education)
- Superintendent: Mary Jane McNamara
- Area trustee: Michael Ford
- School number: 917508
- Grades: 9-13
- Enrollment: 834
- Language: English

Humbergrove Secondary School (also called Humbergrove SS, HSS, Humbergrove, colloquially Humbergrove Collegiate Institute), originally known as Humbergrove Vocational School is a Toronto District School Board facility that operated as a public high school operated by the Etobicoke Board of Education from 1965 to 1988. As of 2019, the building remains under TDSB ownership.

== See also ==
- List of high schools in Ontario
- Marian Academy
- Father Henry Carr Catholic Secondary School
