= Keiller Mackay Collegiate Institute =

Keiller MacKay Collegiate Institute
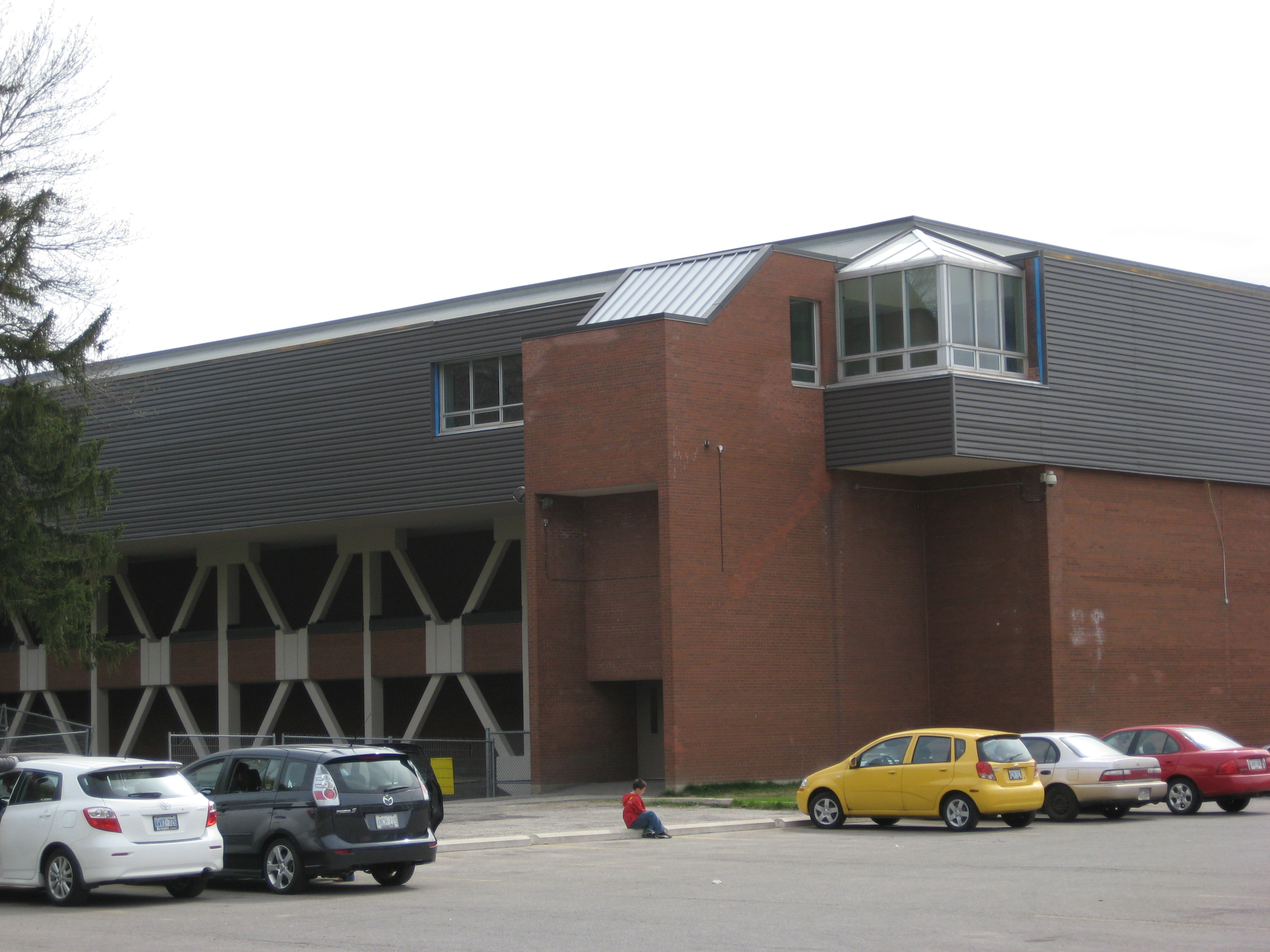

Location
- 2 St. Andrews Boulevard; Kingsview Village, Etobicoke, Ontario, M9R 1V8; Canada; 43.701910°N 79.550371°W

Information
- School type: High School
- Motto: "Manu Forti" (Strong Hands)
- Founded: 1971
- Status: Inactive / Sold
- Closed: 1983
- School board: Etobicoke Board of Education
- Superintendent: Susan Winter
- Area trustee: Chris Glover
- School number: 919144
- Principal: Gordon Fleming
- Grades: 9-13
- Enrollment: 840
- Language: English
- Area: Islington Avenue and Highway 401 (Ontario)
- Colours: Green and Blue
- Mascot: Saber-toothed cat
- Team name: Keiller Mackay Sabres

Keiller MacKay Collegiate Institute (KMCI, Keiller MacKay) is a medium-sized public high school building located in Toronto's west end close to the intersection of Islington Avenue and Highway 401. Opened in 1971 until closing in 1983, it was overseen by the Etobicoke Board of Education, which was joined with other school boards in the Toronto area during the city's amalgamation to form what is now the Toronto District School Board. As of August 2017, the building is home to the Toronto Argonauts practice facility.

== See also ==
- List of high schools in Ontario
