= Father Henry Carr Catholic Secondary School =

Catholic high school in Ontario, Canada

Father Henry Carr Catholic Secondary School (Humbergrove Campus)

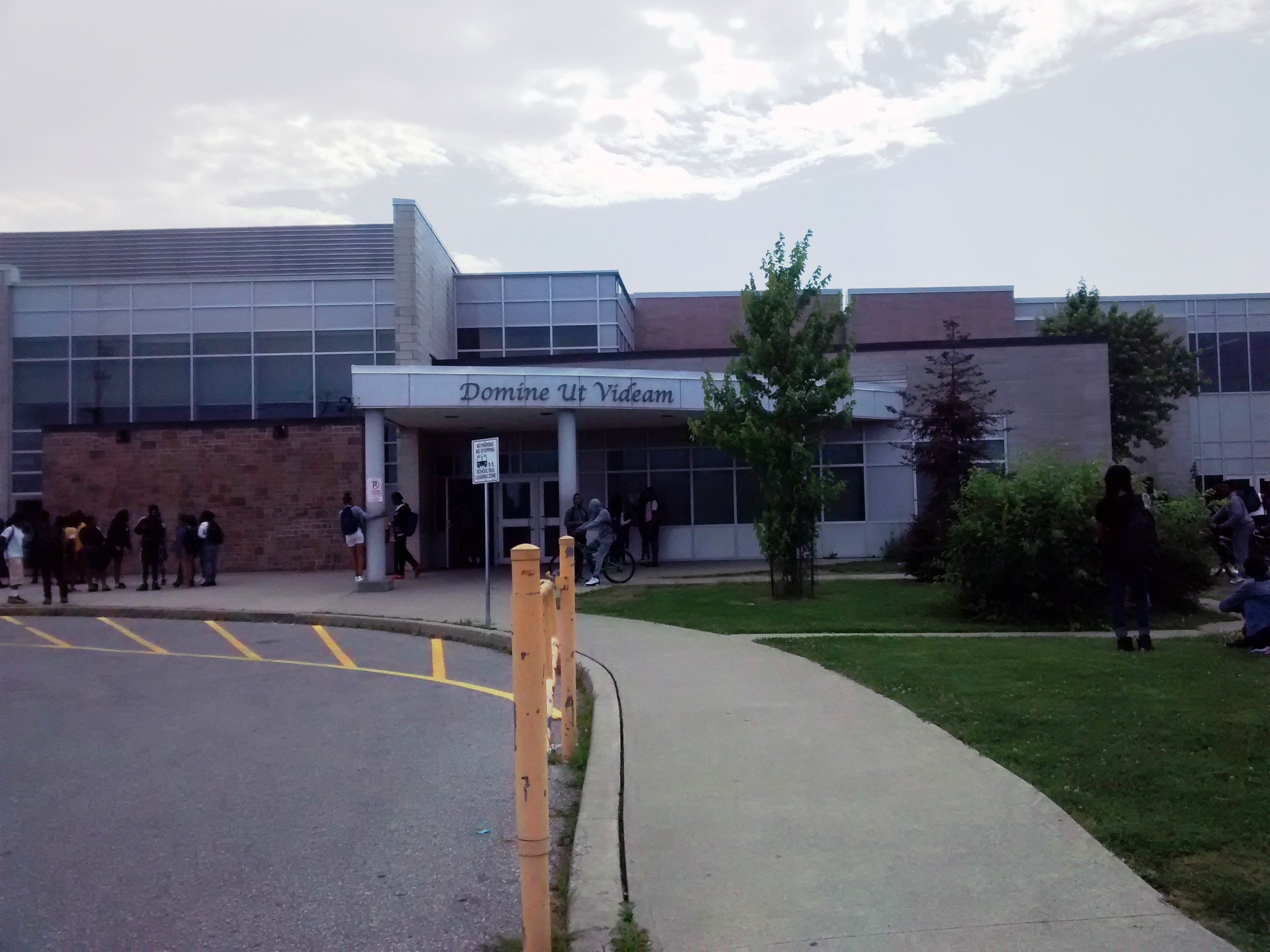
- Father Henry Carr in the former Marian Academy building. It was originally built as Humbergrove S.S. in 1966.

Location
- 1760 Martin Grove Road; Toronto, Ontario, M9V 3S4; Canada; 43.7358°N 79.5923°W

Information
- Former name: Humbergrove Secondary School Marian Academy Catholic Secondary School
- School type: Bill 30 Catholic High school
- Motto: Domine ut videam (Lord that I might see)
- Religious affiliations: Roman Catholic (Basilian Fathers)
- Founded: 1974
- School board: Toronto Catholic District School Board (Metropolitan Separate School Board)
- Superintendent: Flora Cifelli; Area 1
- Area trustee: Joseph Martino; Ward 1
- School number: 521 / 707589
- Principal: Francesco Malfitano
- Faculty: 62
- Grades: 9–100
- Enrolment: 904 (2017–18)
- Language: English
- Colours: Royal Blue and white
- Athletics conference: Toronto District Colleges Athletic Association
- Mascot: Crusader
- Team name: Carr Crusaders
- Parish: St. Andrew
- Specialist High Skills Major: Arts and Culture; Justice, Community Safety and Emergency Services; Transportation
- Program focus: Broad-based technology Advanced Placement; Legal Education Advanced Plan (LEAP)
- Website: fatherhenrycarr.tcdsb.org

Father Henry Carr Catholic Secondary School (also referred to as Father Henry Carr, Henry Carr, FHC, FHCCSS, or Carr) is a Catholic high school in Toronto, Ontario, Canada. It is administered by the Toronto Catholic District School Board, formerly the Metropolitan Separate School Board. It is named after a Basilian Father and founder of the Pontifical Institute of Mediaeval Studies, Henry Carr (1880–1963).

The school was founded in 1974 by the Basilian Fathers and the MSSB as a semi-private school, though the current school building was originally opened in 1966 as Humbergrove Secondary School by the Etobicoke Board of Education when the board merged into the Toronto District School Board in which the school property is leased to the MSSB/TCDSB since 1988. The Humbergrove school was renamed to Marian Academy in 1988 and closed in 2002, though Carr occupied the property since 2007.

Carr offers the Advanced Placement (AP) academic program and is known for its elite basketball team. The motto of the school is Domine ut Videam, which translates into "Lord That I Might See".

== History ==
After the opening of one of Etobicoke's first Catholic high schools, Bishop Power High School for boys in 1957 by the Basilian Fathers. At that time, pupils attended Roman Catholic schools nearby such as St. Andrew, St. Angela, Holy Child, St. Dorothy, or St. Jude while its graduates attended either North Albion Collegiate Institute or West Humber Collegiate Institute.

On September 3, 1974 the Basilian Fathers and the Metropolitan Separate School Board opened Father Henry Carr High School under its founding principal, Fr. Thomas Mohan C.S.B. The school building was erected in 1976 on the original 21 Panorama Court building on Kipling and Albion. The school facilities in the original building consisted of one main two-story building and 16 portables, with a cafeteria, gymnasium/auditorium and a playing field.

Throughout the school's early existence, it operated as a private school for Grades 11 to 13 only while the MSSB educated grade 9 and 10 students. This changed in 1985 when the Government of Ontario passed Bill 30 to extend funding to Roman Catholic high schools beyond grade 10 and Carr was ceased to be a private school in 1987. However, in 1988, nearby Humbergrove Secondary School, built in 1966 on Martin Grove Road, was closed and reopened by the MSSB as Marian Academy with 165 pupils. The school closed its doors in 2002 due to declining enrolment.

The school moved to the former Marian building in September 2007. The new Carr campus, at the cost of $10 million, consisted of the new main entrance, central community atrium, cafeteria, drama studio, labs, three automotive bays, new windows, stonework and landscaping. The former school building was sold to the City of Toronto in 2009 and reopened the old Panorama school building as a community hub. The renovated school was designed by Makrimichalos Cugini Architects Inc. whilst the original school building built in 1966 was designed by architect Gordon S. Adamson.

== Sports ==
FHC has the Field of Dreams, a football and track field with artificial turf field. It offers sports such as basketball, hockey (not since 2005), football, softball, cricket, track and field, volleyball, badminton, cross-country, and swimming.

=== Basketball ===
The school is known for its boys' basketball program, being one of the highest ranked and consistently competitive teams in Toronto, as a member of the Toronto District Colleges Athletic Association (TDCAA), Ontario Scholastic Basketball Association (OSBA) and Ontario Federation of School Athletic Associations (OFSAA). The FHC Crusaders founded the prep program in 2015-16, the same year they captured the OFSAA "AAA" title. Following a brief hiatus mostly due to Covid-19 pandemic, the prep program was restarted in 2024 by Principal Francesco Malfitano and Teacher-Coach Paul Melnik.

Throughout its existence, the FHC Crusaders had a rivalry with Eastern Commerce Saints until closing in 2015. The prep team has partnered with Air Jordan as the official supplier and sponsors of the Early Bird Classic and hosts the "Jordan Brand Players Lounge".

The Crusaders Basketball teams host their home games in the Father Ted McLean Gymnasium, dedicated by then-principal Michael Rossetti in 2012.

== Notable people ==
- Sim Bhullar, first person of Indian descent to play in the NBA
- Dillon Brooks (born 1996), NBA basketball player
- Carlo Colaiacovo, former NHL hockey player; radio host and TV analyst at The Sports Network
- Enrico Colantoni, TV and movie actor
- Tyler Ennis (born 1994), Israeli Basketball Premier League basketball player, formerly NBA basketball player
- Patrick Flatley, former NHL hockey player
- Paul Higgins, former NHL ice hockey winger
- Yoana Peralta (born 1999), Canadian-Dominican footballer
- Taévaunn Prince (born 1991), Canadian-Jamaican former basketball player

== See also ==
- Education in Ontario
- List of secondary schools in Ontario
