= Thistletown Collegiate Institute =

High school in Toronto, Ontario, Canada

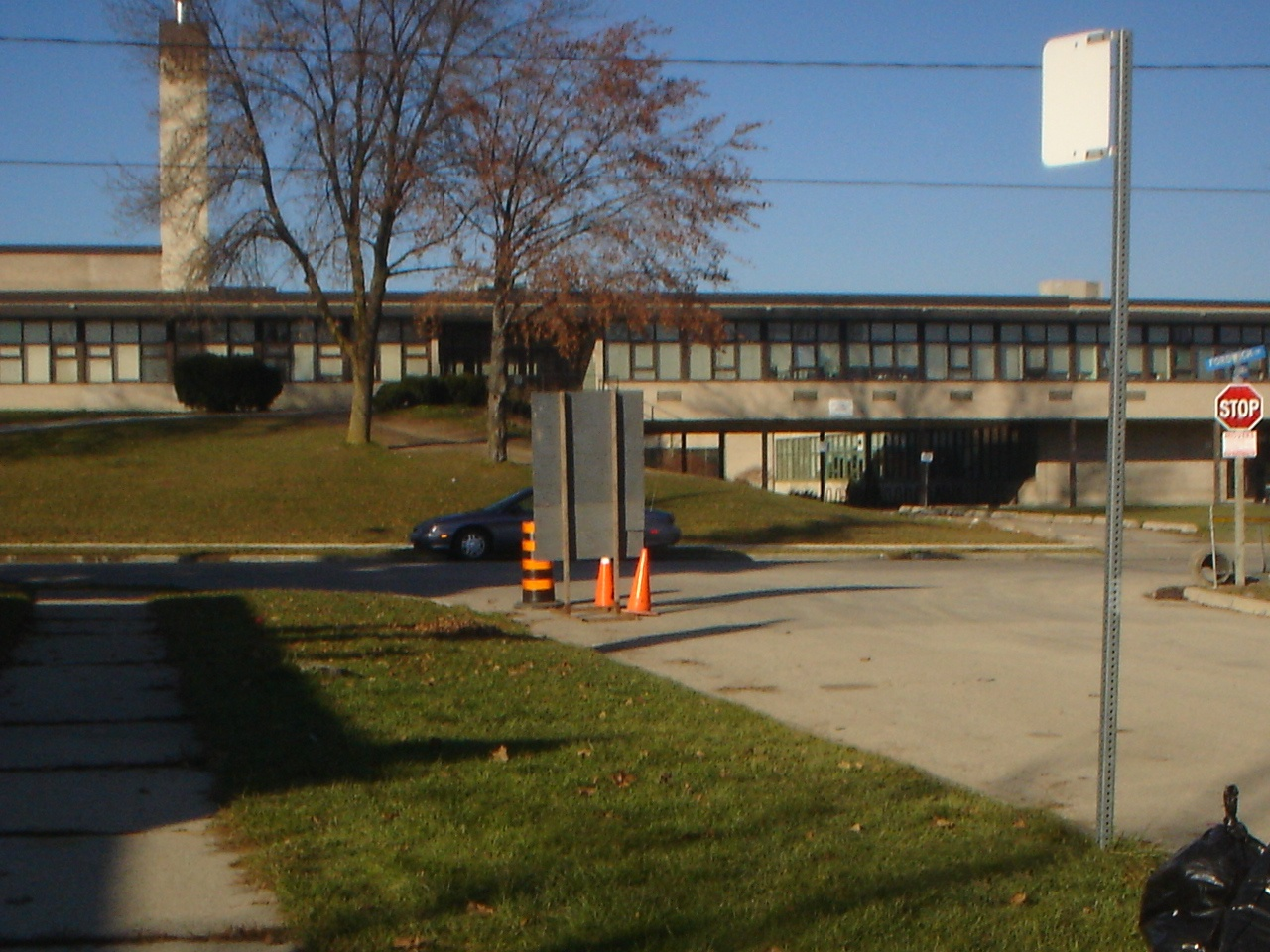
- Thistletown Collegiate Institute, viewed from Pakenham Drive, in 2006.

Location
- 20 Fordwich Crescent; Toronto,, Ontario, M9W 2T4; Canada; 43.727554°N 79.562425°W

Information
- School type: Public, high school
- Motto: Scientia Crescat Vita Colatur (Let knowledge grow so that life may be enriched)
- Founded: 1957
- School board: Toronto District School Board (Etobicoke Board of Education)
- Superintendent: Ali Jahangir
- Area trustee: Dennis Hastings
- Principal: Keith Johnson
- Grades: 9-12
- Enrolment: 460 (2019-20)
- Language: English
- Schedule type: Semestered
- Campus size: 14.5 acres
- Area: Thistletown
- Colours: Red, White and Black
- Team name: Thistletown Black Scots
- Website: schoolweb.tdsb.on.ca/thistletownci
- Last updated: April 14, 2025

Thistletown Collegiate Institute (also called Thistletown C.I., T.C.I. or Thistletown) is a public high school in Toronto, Ontario, Canada. The school is located at the corner of Fordwich Crescent and Islington Avenue in the district of Etobicoke. The motto of the school is "Scientia Crescat Vita Colatur" (Let knowledge grow so that life may be enriched). It is administered by the Toronto District School Board.

== History ==
Thistletown's first school, made of one frame schoolhouse was opened in 1874 on the east side of Islington Av., just south of Albion Rd. It was moved eastward to Village Green in 1901. The school expanded to reflect the growth in the village. In 1947, the Etobicoke Board of Education was established and a new building was built. The school was renamed to Thistletown Middle School.

Construction of the current school began in 1956, and its first students were admitted in September 1957 as Etobicoke's seventh secondary school. The late 1960s brought expansions to technical and vocational facilities.

== Campus ==
Thistletown Collegiate is a white-bricked, two-story 167,273-square-foot (15,540 m^{2}) secondary school on a 14.5-acre campus. The main entrance is located on the second level.

== Athletics ==
In 2009, Thistletown C.I. started its football program up with a very successful season. They were crowned champions in 2015, primarily due to not letting a single touchdown occur. They won for a consecutive time in 2016.

In 2005, Thistletown C.I.'s varsity hockey team won the city championship and the year before they went undefeated all season.

Athletic triumphs include the Etobicoke senior football championship, earned in 1969 by defeating the Etobicoke H.S. Rams. The senior basketball team reached the T.D.I.A.A. finals, consisting of all the outer boroughs of Metropolitan Toronto (Etobicoke, Scarborough, North York, East York, and York) in 1972 and 1975, only to suffer defeat at the hands of the George Harvey Hawks. The senior boys soccer team won the inaugural OFSAA championship in 1969, their only ever provincial championship win in soccer.

== Alumni ==
- Nav (rapper), Canadian hip hop recording artist and record producer

== See also ==
- Education in Ontario
- List of secondary schools in Ontario
