= Thistletown =

- Neighbourhood
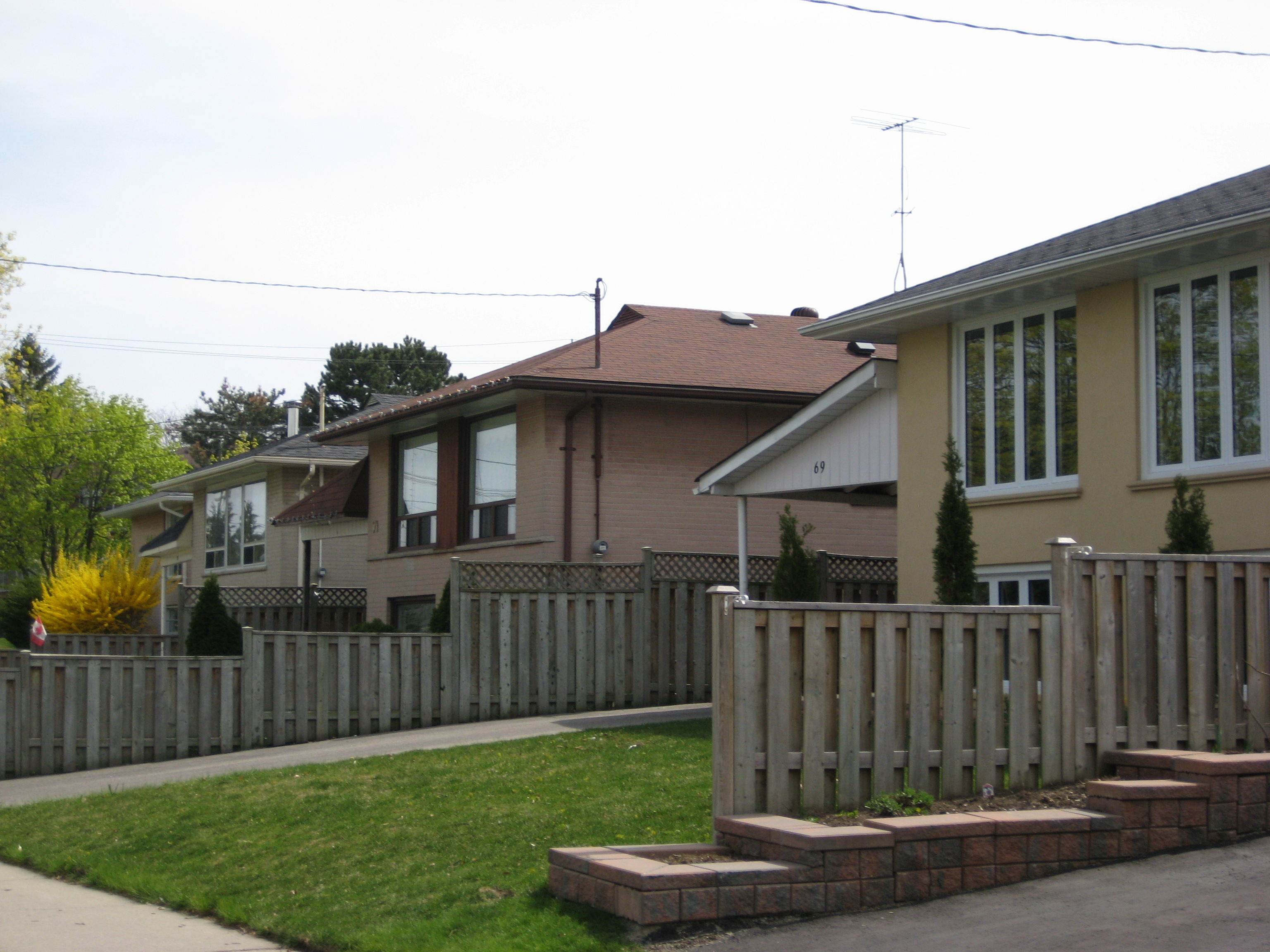
- Residences in Thistletown

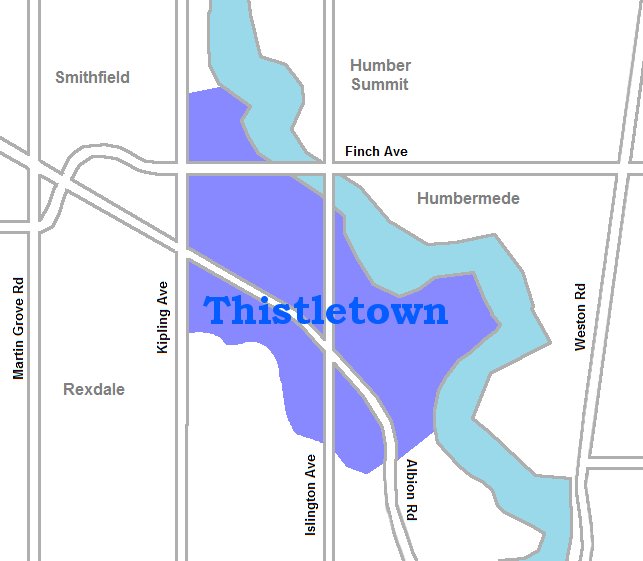
- Coordinates: 43°44′14″N 79°33′55″W
- Country: Canada
- Province: Ontario
- City: Toronto
- Founded: 1847 (Postal village) St Andrews
- Established: 1933 (Police village)
- Changed Municipality: 1953 (into Etobicoke)
- Changed Division: 1953 (into Metropolitan Toronto)
- Amalgamated: 1998 (into Toronto)

Government
  - MP: John Zerucelli (Etobicoke North)
  - MPP: Doug Ford (Etobicoke North)
  - Councillor: Vincent Crisanti (Ward 1 Etobicoke North)

Thistletown is a culturally diverse neighbourhood in Toronto, Ontario, Canada. It consists of the area surrounding the intersection of Albion Road and Islington Avenue. The borders of Thistletown are generally delineated by the Humber River: the West Branch to the south, slightly beyond the river to the east, and to the William Osler Health Centre - Etobicoke General Hospital just above the river in the north. The western border is Kipling Avenue, though the part of the neighbourhood west of Islington is sometimes considered a separate area named Beaumonde Heights.

Established as a postal village in 1847, it served the surrounding farms of Etobicoke Township. The area remained largely agricultural until after World War II, joining Metropolitan Toronto in 1953. By the 1970s, residential subdivisions replaced the farm lands of Thistletown. Today the area is fully urban.

This area has seen many changes and many ethnic groups arrive and flourish. Presently the corners of Albion and Islington in Thistletown has a large presence of East Indian stores and services. They are joined by a variety of Caribbean, Indian, Sri Lankan, and Pakistani stores. 43% of those living in this area, more specifically the CT-0250.05 are of Indian, Pakistani, Bangladeshi and Nepali origin, with those of black origin making up 22%. One landmark is the Franklin Carmichael Art Group at 34 Riverdale Drive, is named for Group of Seven member Franklin Carmichael by an art foundation founded by his widow and Dr. Ann Curtin.

== History ==
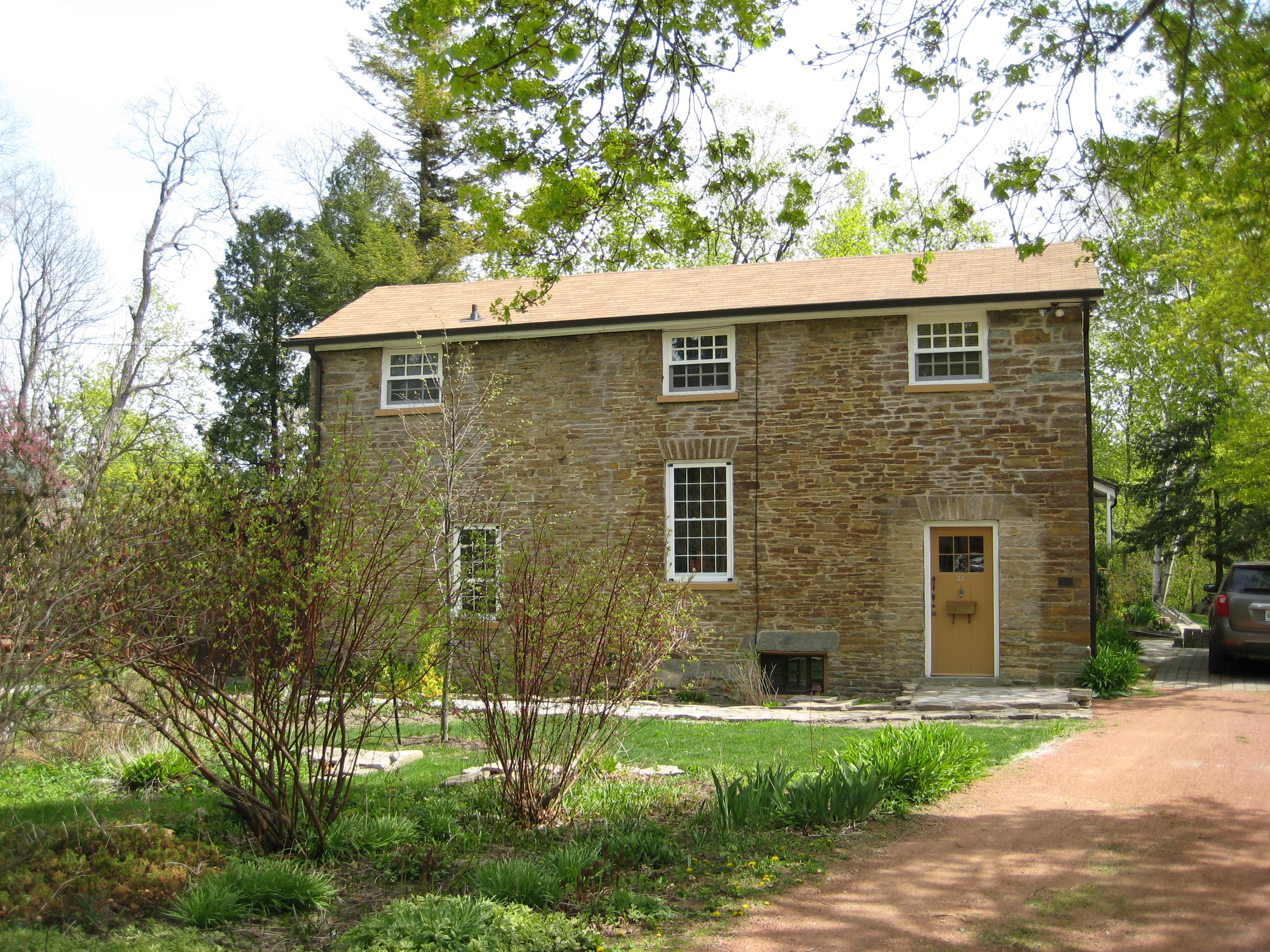
John Grubb built his home in Thistletown in 1832.

The village of Thistletown (originally called St Andrew's) was planned for John Grubb (1783-1850) in 1847 around the intersection of Albion Road and Islington Avenue. Grubb migrated from Scotland to Etobicoke in 1833. The property was part of John Grubb's farmlands. Grubb was a promoter of the Albion and the Weston plank toll road companies, an elected member of the Home District Council and a magistrate. Although originally known as St. Andrew's (likely to honour his Scottish roots after the Patron Saint of Scotland), Thistletown was renamed in honour of Dr. William Thistle, the local physician.

In 1933, Thistletown became a Police village and 2 trustees were elected.

In the late 1950s development from the expanding city of Toronto reached Thistletown when a subdivision, Albion Gardens, was developed on local potato farm to the north and east of Albion Road.

== Institutions ==
- Thistletown Regional Centre of Children and Adolescents - started as The Hospital for Sick Children Thistletown Branch in 1927
- Albion West Plaza

Parks

- Albion Gardens Park
- Beaumonde Heights Park
- Kipling Heights Park
- Rowntree Mills Park - named for Joseph Rowntree, a 19th century settler who established the "Greenholme Mills" on the Humber River, including a grist mill built in 1848 in Etobicoke.

Churches

- Our Saviour Lutheran Church (1957)
- Thistletown Baptist Church
- Fellowship (2012 merger of Albion Gardens and Pine Ridge) Presbyterian Church
- St Andrews Roman Catholic Church

== Schools ==
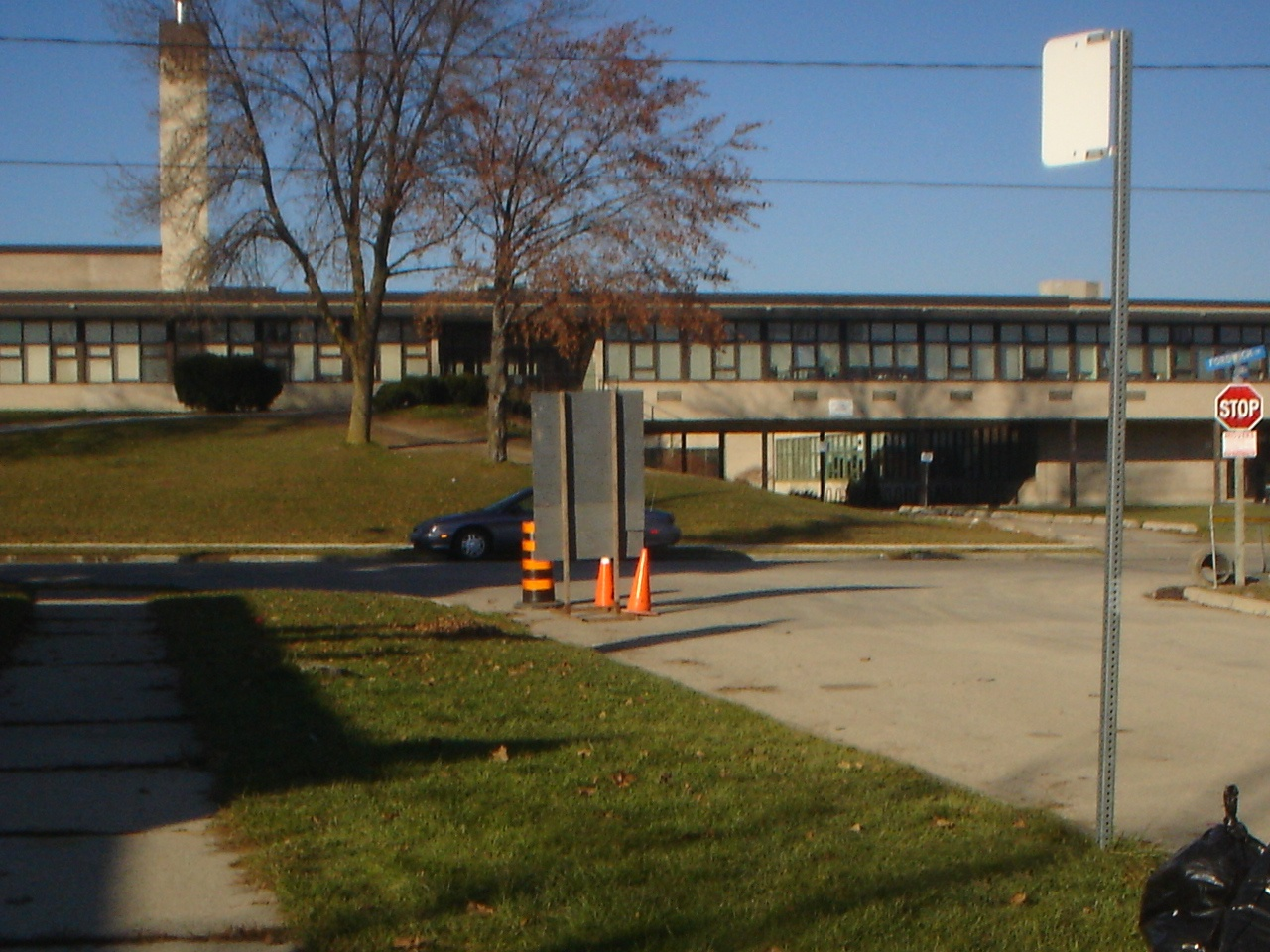
Located in Thistletown, Thistletown Collegiate Institute is a secondary school operated by the Toronto District School Board.

The original school in the district was Thistletown Public School which opened in 1874. It was a one room school house built on the east side of Islington Av., just south of Albion Rd. before moving eastward to Village Green in 1901. A new building was erected in 1947 and the school was renamed to Thistletown Middle School before closing in 1985 by the Etobicoke Board of Education. Today, the school now operates as a multi-service community centre.

Today, five elementary schools operate in the neighbourhood:

- Braeburn Junior School
- St Andrews Catholic Elementary School
- St John Vianney Catholic Elementary School
- Beaumonde Heights Junior Middle School
- École élémentaire catholique Saint-Noël-Chabanel

The Toronto District School Board is the only school board to operate a secondary school in the area, Thistletown Collegiate Institute.
