= Vincent Crisanti =

Canadian politician

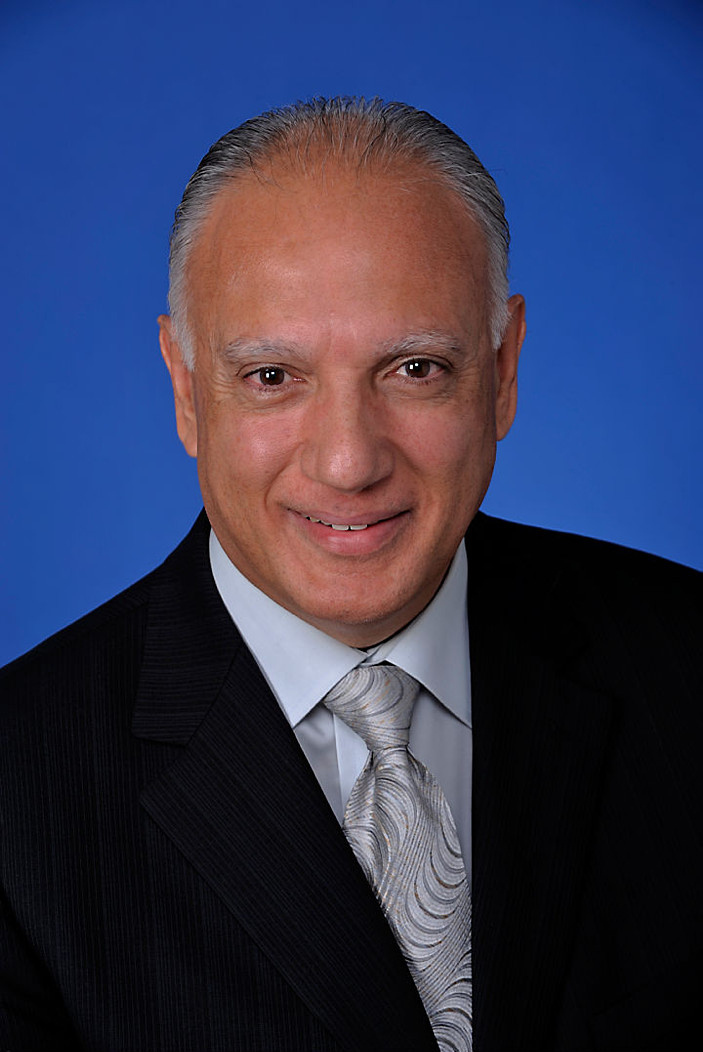
- Crisanti in 2010

Toronto City Councillor for Ward 1 Etobicoke North
- Incumbent
- Assumed office November 15, 2022
- Preceded by: Rose Milczyn
- In office December 1, 2010 – December 1, 2018
- Preceded by: Suzan Hall
- Succeeded by: Ward dissolved

Personal details
- Born: 1953 (age 72–73)

Vincent Crisanti (born 1953) is a Canadian politician who was elected to represent Ward 1 Etobicoke North on Toronto City Council following the 2022 municipal election. He previously represented a former ward by the same name from 2010 to 2018.

== Political career ==
=== Early runs and 2010 election ===
Crisanti ran unsuccessfully in the 1997 municipal election for councillor in Ward 5, Rexdale Thistletown. Crisanti ran again in both the 2000 municipal election and the 2003 municipal election for councillor for Ward 1 Etobicoke North losing both times to Suzan Hall; the first time by only 97 votes.

Crisanti successfully ran a fourth time for councillor for Ward 1 in the 2010 municipal election defeating Hall by 509 votes.

=== Toronto Transit Commission board ===
On December 8, 2010, he was appointed to the Toronto Transit Commission (TTC) board by the city council.

In March 2012, Crisanti was one of five councillors removed from the TTC board. He had been one of five councillors on the board who had voted to terminate the services of the TTC General Manager Gary Webster.

Andy Byford was hired as Webster's replacement. As a result of the decision to terminate Webster, the five councillors who supported Webster's termination and his replacement by Byford, including Crisanti, were removed from the TTC board by the city council on March 5, 2012, before the end of their appointed term as a result of a motion by the Chair of the TTC Board, Councillor Karen Stintz.

Crisanti was re-elected as councillor for Ward 1 in the 2014 municipal election, and he was re-appointed to the TTC board after the election of Mayor John Tory. Under Byford's leadership the TTC subsequently won the 2017 American Public Transportation Association's (APTA) award for Transit System of the Year.

=== Deputy mayor ===
Crisanti was named a deputy mayor of Toronto by John Tory on December 1, 2014.

On September 8, 2017, at the "Ford Fest" BQQ event where Doug Ford announced his candidacy for mayor of Toronto in 2018, Crisanti was quoted as publicly saying “If anybody out there doubts the power of Ford Nation, just come here tonight … I got first elected in 2010 with the support of Rob Ford and I’m here today because of the Fords and I want to thank them.” As a result of Crisanti's statement, which was interpreted as support for Doug Ford's candidacy for mayor in the 2018 municipal election, John Tory removed Crisanti as deputy mayor, replacing him with Stephen Holyday.

=== 2018 election ===
Crisanti stood for re-election to Toronto City Council in the 2018 municipal election in the newly expanded Ward 1 Etobicoke North, created as a result of the Toronto ward boundary changes imposed by the Ontario government of Doug Ford. The new Ward 1 had the same boundaries as the federal and provincial ridings. In the campaign, Premier Ford announced his support for his nephew Michael Ford, to whom Crisanti would lose.

=== 2022 election ===
Crisanti was elected as councillor for Etobicoke North in October 2022, the first time since 1997 the north Etobicoke ward elected a councillor not a member of the Ford family.

== Electoral history ==
2026 Toronto municipal election, Ward 1 Etobicoke North
Candidate	Votes	%	minus
Vincent Crisanti (X)	12,804	45.51	4.44 ▲
Ala'a Adib	4,005	14.24	–
Chloe Brown	3,207	11.40	–
Kristian Santos	2,165	7.70	4.01 ▲
Saima Babar	1,475	5.24	–
Norman Hamilton	1,438	5.11	–
Hard Parmar	1,256	4.46	–
Joseph Martino	979	3.48	–
Nathen Masri	415	1.48	–
Abraham Abbey	389	1.38	0.34 ▼

2022 Toronto municipal election, Ward 1 Etobicoke North
Candidate	Votes	Vote share
Vincent Crisanti	6,815	41.07
Avtar Minhas	3,409	20.54
Charles Ozzoude	1,023	6.16
Subhash Chand	934	5.63
Bill Britton	805	4.85
Michelle Garcia	620	3.74
Kristian Santos	613	3.69
Dev Narang	436	2.63
Ricardo Santos	421	2.54
Abraham Abbey	285	1.72
Keith Stephen	282	1.70
Christopher Noor	261	1.57
John Genser	198	1.19
Alistair Courtney	185	1.11
Mohit Sharma	185	1.11
Donald Pell	123	0.74

2018 Toronto municipal election, Ward 1 Etobicoke North
Candidate	Votes	Vote share
Michael Ford	10,648	42.26%
Vincent Crisanti	8,654	34.34%
Naiima Farah	2,262	8.98%
Shirish Patel	1,945	7.72%
Carol Royer	642	2.55%
Michelle Garcia	439	1.74%
Peter D'Gama	253	1.00%
Christopher Noor	214	0.85%
Gurinder Patri	142	0.56%
Total	25,199	100%
Source: City of Toronto

2014 Toronto election, Ward 1 - Etobicoke North
Candidate	Votes	%
Vincent Crisanti (incumbent)	7,427	46.31
Avtar Minhas	3,118	19.44
Jeff Corbett	1,699	10.59
Patricia Crooks	942	5.87
Idil Burale	878	5.47
Arsalan Baig	721	4.50
Khaliq Mahmood	304	1.90
Gurinder Patri	269	1.68
Akhtar Ayub	196	1.22
Charan Hundal	173	1.08
Christopher Noor	172	1.07
Dino Caltsoudas	140	0.87
Total	16,039	100.00%

2010 Toronto election, Ward 1
Candidate	Votes	%
Vincent Crisanti	5,505	40.73%
Suzan Hall (incumbent)	4,996	36.96%
Omar Farouk	1,573	11.64%
Sharad Sharma	883	6.53%
Ted Berger	388	2.87%
Peter D'Gama	169	1.25%
Total	13,514	100%

2003 Toronto election, Ward 1
Candidate	Votes	%
Suzan Hall (incumbent)	3,462	30.85%
Vincent Crisanti	2,580	22.99%
Ranjeet Chahal	1,737	15.47%
Hazoor Elahi	1,016	9.05%
Anthony Caputo	948	8.44%
Michelle Munroe	857	7.63%
Ikram Freed	491	4.37%
Chitranjan Gill	92	0.81%
Singh Khipple	39	0.34%
Total	11,222	100%

2000 Toronto election, Ward 1
Candidate	Votes	%
Suzan Hall	2,894	24.80%
Vincent Crisanti	2,797	23.97%
Manjinder Singh	2,471	21.17%
Bruce Sinclair (incumbent)	1,907	16.34%
Anthony Caputo	978	8.38%
Murphy Browne	364	3.11%
Courtney Doldron	134	1.14%
Alan Nemaric	64	0.54%
Albin Janus	59	0.50%
Total	11,668	100%
