= Metro Bowl =

Secondary school football championship in Greater Toronto, Canada

Venue	Tim Hortons Field (since 2015)
Location	Toronto
Previous Venues	Rogers Centre 2008–2012; Varsity Stadium 2007; Ivor Wynne Stadium 2006; Rogers Centre (formerly Sky Dome) 1990–2005; Esther Shiner Stadium 1984–1989; St. Michael's College Stadium 1983; Lamport Stadium 1982
Operated	1982–2012, 2015—present
Conference Tie-ins (pre-2012)	CISAA, LOSSA, TDCAA, TDSSAA and YRAA
- 2015 Metro Bowl Final
- Resurrection CSS Phoenix v Etobicoke CI Rams 31–8

The Metro Bowl has traditionally been the championship game for Secondary School football teams in the Greater Toronto Area, Canada, from 1982 until 2012. The game was revived by the Ontario Federation of School Athletic Associations beginning in 2015 as one of a series of nine regionally themed bowl games held as part of an annual Ontario football bowl game festival since 2015. Rather than a strictly Toronto-area championship, the Metro Bowl is now held between one of either the Toronto District College Athletic Association (TDCAA) representing Catholic schools or the Toronto District Secondary School Athletic Association (TDSSAA) representing public schools, alternating each year, against another Ontario association's champion determined by draw. The Toronto association not playing in the Metro Bowl in a particular year will instead play in one of the other bowl games.

The game has been held annually during the later part of November or early December at a venue in or in close proximity to the City of Toronto.

Schools with multiple titles are: St. Michael's College School, Toronto (7); Richview Collegiate Institute, Toronto (3); Central Technical School, Toronto 2; Nelson High School, Burlington (4); Northern Secondary School (Toronto) (2); St. Patrick's Catholic High School, Sarnia (2) Woburn Collegiate Institute, Toronto (2)

== Results ==
2025

CHAMPION: Robert F Hall C.S.S.

Robert F Hall 42 - Chaminade 0

=== 2016 ===
CHAMPION: St. Matthew High School

Michael Power/St. Joseph High School (7) – St. Matthew High School (28)

Championship (TDCAA vs NCSSAA)

(TDSSAA champion to play in Northern Bowl)

=== 2015 ===
Championship (TDSSAA vs CWOSSA):

Resurrection Catholic Secondary School Phoenix (CWOSSA) 31, Etobicoke Collegiate Institute Rams (TDSSAA) 8, played December 2.

(TDCAA champion played in the Western Bowl)

=== 2012 ===
Metro Quarter-finals			Metro semi-finals		Metro Bowl
YRAA	Huron Heights	18
	King City	13	Huron Heights	40
LOSSA	Wilson	42	Wilson	3
	Holy Trinity	20			Huron Heights	28
TDCAA	Don Bosco	31			Don Bosco	14
TDSSAA	Northern	0	Don Bosco	27
CISAA	St. Andrew's College	28	St. Andrew's College	11
	Upper Canada College	0

=== 2011 ===
Conference finals			Metro semi-finals		Metro Bowl
LOSSA	Wilson	18
	Holy Trinity	7	Wilson	20
TDSSAA	Northern	14	Northern	17
	Agincourt	11			Wilson	21 (OT)
CISAA	St. Andrew's College	27			St. Andrew's College	14
	Upper Canada College	22	St. Andrew's College	22
YRAA	King City	10	King City	15
	Huron Heights	9

=== 2010 ===
Conference finals			Metro semi-finals		Metro Bowl
LOSSA	Holy Trinity	33
	Wilson	32	Holy Trinity	25
CISAA	Upper Canada College	40	Upper Canada College	16
	St. Andrew's College	34			Holy Trinity	28
YRAA	King City	28			King City	3
	Huron Heights	0	King City	55
TDSSAA	Richview	16	Richview	23
	Leaside	14

=== 2009 ===
Conference finals			Metro semi-finals		Metro Bowl
YRAA	Markham	22
	Huron Heights	15	Markham	16
LOSSA	Wilson	21	Wilson	7
	St. Mary	14			Markham	19
TDSSAA	Birchmount Park	21			Birchmount Park	0
	Northern	0	Birchmount Park	16
CISAA	Trinity College School	17	Trinity College School	10
	St. Michael's College	3

=== 2008 ===
Conference finals			Metro semi-finals		Metro Bowl
CISAA	St. Michael's College	27
	St. Andrew's College	7	St. Michael's College	23
YRAA	Huron Heights	42	Huron Heights	7
	Brother André	6			St. Michael's College	42
LOSSA	Wilson	23			Wilson	12
	Holy Trinity	0	Wilson	9
TDSSAA	Northern	31	Northern	3
	Birchmount Park	10

=== 2007 ===
	Conference	Metro semi-finals	Metro Bowl
CISAA	St. Michael's College 36; St. Andrew's College 15	St. Michael's College 45; Wilson 1	St. Michael's College 16; Huron Heights 14
LOSSA	Wilson 20; Dwyer 16	St. Michael's College 45; Wilson 1	St. Michael's College 16; Huron Heights 14
YRAA	Huron Heights 29; Markham 0	Huron Heights 37; Birchmount Park 9	St. Michael's College 16; Huron Heights 14
TDSSAA	Birchmount Park 4 Don Bosco 0	Huron Heights 37; Birchmount Park 9	St. Michael's College 16; Huron Heights 14

=== 2006 ===
	Conference	Metro semi-finals	Metro Bowl
CISAA	St. Michael's College 13; St. Andrew's College 3	St. Michael's College 19; Richview 1	St. Michael's College 18; Pickering 0
TDSSAA	Richview 8 East York 7	St. Michael's College 19; Richview 1	St. Michael's College 18; Pickering 0
LOSSA	Pickering 38; Wilson 0	Pickering 16; Huron Heights 0	St. Michael's College 18; Pickering 0
YRAA	Huron Heights 47; Brother André 14	Pickering 16; Huron Heights 0	St. Michael's College 18; Pickering 0

Note: Following their conference victory, St. Michaels had to play a quarter-final game against the Simcoe County champions with the winner advancing to the semi-finals. St. Michaels College won this game 40–32 over the Bear Creek Kodiaks.

=== 2005 ===
	Conference	Metro semi-finals	Metro Bowl
LOSSA	Pickering 28; Dwyer 4	Pickering 16; Upper Canada College 12	Pickering 24; Huron Heights 19
CISAA	Upper Canada College 24; St. Andrew's College 14	Pickering 16; Upper Canada College 12	Pickering 24; Huron Heights 19
YRAA	Huron Heights 24; Brother Andre 10	Huron Heights 23; Richview 13	Pickering 24; Huron Heights 19
TDSSAA	Richview 18; East York 6	Huron Heights 23; Richview 13	Pickering 24; Huron Heights 19

=== 2004 ===
Championship:
St. Michael's College 22, Pickering H. S. 15

Semi-finals:
St. Michael's College 41, Richmond Hill H. S. 21
Pickering H. S. 18, Northern S. S. 10

=== 2003 ===
Championship:
Cedarbrae C. I. 25, Northern S. S. 21

Semi-finals:
Cedarbrae C. I. 31, Richview C. I. 14
Northern S. S. 23, St. Michael's College School 9

=== 2002 ===
Championship:
St. Michael's College 42, Etobicoke C.I. 6

Semi-finals:
St. Michael's College 27, Central Technical School 0
Etobicoke C.I. 29, Richview C. I. 15

=== 2001 ===
Championship:
Richview C. I. 37, Central Technical 0

Semi-finals:
Richview C. I. 11, Northern S. S. 3
Central Technical 40, Birchmount Park C. I. (Toronto) 21

=== 2000 ===
Championship:
Lorne Park S. S. 11, Notre Dame C. S. S. (Burlington) 0

Semi-finals:
Lorne Park S. S. 28, St. Michael's College 21
Notre Dame C. S. S. (Burlington) 21, St. Mary C. S. S. 0

=== 1999 ===
Championship:
Nelson H. S. 22, Central Technical 20

Semi-finals:
Nelson H. S. 59, St. Mary C. S. S. (Pickering) 8
Central Technical 26, St. Michael's College School 13

Quarter-finals:
Central Technical 7, West Hill C. I. 0
St. Michael's College School 37, Richview C. I. 14
Nelson H. S. 43, St. Andrew's College 32 (Overtime)
St. Mary C. S. S. 42, Barton S. S. (Hamilton) 23

=== 1998 ===
Championship:
St. Michael's College 43, Agincourt C. I. (Toronto) 6

Semi-finals:
St. Michael's College 23, St. Andrew's College (Aurora) 11
Agincourt C. I. 27, Glendale S. S. (Hamilton) 22

=== 1997 ===
Championship:
Nelson H. S. (Burlington) 14, Cedarbrae C. I. (Toronto) 7

Semi-finals:
Nelson H. S. 31, Central Technical School 0
Cedarbrae C. I. 28, Michael Power/St. Joseph H.S. 6

Quarter-finals:
Cedarbrae C. I. 28, Henry Street H. S. 21
Michael Power/St. Joseph H.S. 14, St. Michael's College 7
Central Technical School 12, Northern S. S. 0
Nelson H. S. 28, Loyola C. S. S. (Mississauga) 0

=== 1996 ===
Championship:
Clarkson S. S. (Mississauga) 27, St. Michael's College School 0

Semi-finals:
Clarkson S. S. 20, Central Technical 13 (OT)
St. Michael's College School 20, Trinity College School (Port Hope) 6

Quarter-finals:
Trinity College School 27, Markham D. H. S. 13
Central Technical 6, Cedarbrae C. I. 1
St. Michael's College 21, Richview C. I. 14 (OT)
Clarkson S. S. 41, Waterdown D. H. S. (Waterdown) 35

=== 1995 ===
Championship:
St. Patrick's 37, Mayfield S. S. (Caledon) 34 (Overtime)

Semi-finals:
St. Patrick's 29, St. Michael's College 14
Mayfield S. S. 29, Dunbarton H. S. (Pickering) 14

=== 1994 ===
Championship:
Northern S. S. 30, St. Patrick's 21

Semi-finals:
Northern S. S. 8, Pickering H. S. 7
St. Patrick's 48, Lorne Park S. S. (Mississauga) 24

=== 1993 ===
Championship:
St. Patrick's (Sarnia) 20, St. Michael's College 6

Semi-finals:
St. Patrick's 29, West Hill C. I. 12
St. Michael's College 14, Pickering H. S. 7

=== 1992 ===
Championship:
West Hill C. I. (Toronto) 24, Markham D. H. S. 6

Semi-finals:
West Hill C. I. 19, Northern S. S. 8
Markham D. H. S. 21, St. Thomas Aquinas S. S. (Brampton) 8

=== 1991 ===
Championship:
Richview C. I. (Toronto) 42, Central Technical 24

Semi-finals:
Richview C. I. 36, Henry Street (Whitby) 19
Central Technical 35; St. Michael's College 27

=== 1990 ===
Championship:
Northern S. S. 14, Markham D. H. S. 11

Semi-finals:
Northern S. S. 29, Philip Pocock C. S. S. (Mississauga) 22
Markham D. H. S. 22, Victoria Park C. I. 21

=== 1989 ===
Championship:
Sir John A. Macdonald C. I. (Toronto) 27, Michael Power/St. Joseph H.S. (Toronto) 8

Semi-finals:
Sir John A. Macdonald C. I. 16, Crestwood S. S. (Peterborough) 7
Michael Power/St. Joseph H.S. 37, King City S. S. (King City) 25

=== 1988 ===
Championship:
Central Technical 16, Pickering H. S. 10

Semi-finals:
Central Technical 53, Etobicoke C.I. (Toronto) 20
Pickering H. S. 9, Stephen Leacock C. I. 6

=== 1987 ===
Championship:
Central Technical 20, Monsignor Paul Dwyer C. H. S. (Oshawa) 14

Semi-finals:
Central Technical 20; Stephen Leacock C. I. (Toronto) 14
Monsignor Paul Dwyer C. H. S. 33, A. Y. Jackson Secondary School (Toronto) 7

=== 1986 ===
Championship:
Victoria Park C. I. 21, Markham D. H. S. 12

Semi-finals:
Victoria Park C. I. 27, Pickering H. S. (Ajax) 8
Markham D. H. S. 15, Western Technical (Toronto) 12

=== 1985 ===
Championship:
Woburn C. I. 33, Victoria Park C. I. (Toronto) 12

Semi-finals:
Woburn C. I. 29, Central Technical (Toronto) 13
Victoria Park C. I. 22, Markham D. H. S. (Markham) 14

=== 1984 ===
Championship:
Georges Vanier S.S. (Toronto) 36, Northern S. S. (Toronto) 5

Semi-finals:
Georges Vanier S.S. 25, Woburn C. I. 3
Northern S. S. (bye)

=== 1983 ===
Championship:
Woburn C. I. 21, East York C. I. (Toronto) 14

Semi-finals: unknown

=== 1982 ===
Championship:
St. Michael's College (Toronto) 13, Woburn C. I. (Toronto) 0

Semi-finals: none played

== MVPs ==
- 2012: Kaleb Scott QB, Huron Heights Secondary School, Newmarket
- 2011: Chivon Gallagher SB, Donald A Wilson Secondary School, Whitby
- 2010: Earl Anderson RB, Holy Trinity Catholic Secondary School (Courtice)
- 2009: Tyler Pritty, QB, Markham District High School, Markham
- 2008: Brendan Morgan, RB, St. Michael's College School, Toronto
- 2007: Eddie Houghton, RB, St. Michael's College School, Toronto
- 2006: Chris Rossetti, QB, St. Michael's College School, Toronto
- 2005: Frank Aiello, RB, Pickering High School, Ajax
- 2004: Charlie Houghton, RB, St. Michael's College School, Toronto
- 2003: Matthew Morris, QB, Cedarbrae Collegiate Institute, Toronto
- 2002: George Polyzois, RB, St. Michael's College School, Toronto
- 2001: Tom Flaxman, RB, Richview Collegiate Institute, Toronto
- 2000: Marc Champagnie, RB, Lorne Park Secondary School, Mississauga
- 1999: Dwight McKenzie, RB, Central Technical School, Toronto
- 1998: Mark Chiarcossi, RB, St. Michael's College School, Toronto
- 1997: Jason Currie, QB/S, Nelson High School (Ontario), Burlington
- 1996: Marvin Brereton, RB, Clarkson Secondary School, Mississauga
- 1995: Terry Kleinsmith, QB, St. Patrick's Catholic High School, Sarnia
- 1994: George Zegas, RB, Northern Secondary School (Toronto)
- 1993: Terry Kleinsmith, QB, St. Patrick's Catholic High School, Sarnia
- 1992: Alphonso Carter, DT, West Hill Collegiate Institute, Toronto
- 1991: Paul Martin, QB, Richview Collegiate Institute, Toronto
- 1990: Craig Adams, DB/L, Northern Secondary School (Toronto)
- 1989: Carey Bowen, RB, Sir John A. Macdonald Collegiate Institute, Toronto
- 1988: Patrick Burke, RB, Central Technical School, Toronto
- 1987: Paul Ferreira, FB, Central Technical School, Toronto
- 1986: Rob Wilson, TE, Victoria Park Collegiate Institute, Toronto
- 1985: Stuart Harshaw, RB, Woburn Collegiate Institute, Toronto
- 1984: Adam Karlsson, QB, Georges Vanier Secondary School, Toronto
- 1983: Ken Noakes, LB, Woburn Collegiate Institute, Toronto
- 1982: Chris Rick, RB, St. Michael's College School, Toronto

MVPs were chosen by David Grossman of the Toronto Star.
