= Bob Weeks =

Canadian sportswriter

Bob Weeks is a reporter and analyst for TSN, covering golf and curling. He was previously the editorial director of SCOREGolf magazine. In addition, he served as host for SCOREGolf TV. He was also the curling columnist for The Globe and Mail for more than 25 years and editor of the Ontario Curling Report for 30.

Weeks joined TSN on a full-time basis on June 29, 2015.

Weeks joined SCOREGolf as associate editor in October 1987. He was promoted to editor in 1992. In 2012 he became editorial director.

In 2009, he was ranked sixth overall and the top media member on the National Post's list of the most influential people in Canadian golf.

In 2009, he was made an Honorary Life Member of the Ontario Curling Association for his contributions to curling.

In 2013, Weeks was named as the recipient of the Golf Journalists' Association of Canada Dick Grimm Award for lifetime contributions to the game of golf. On May 7, 2014, he became the 67th person to be inducted into the Ontario Golf Hall of Fame. On November 6, 2014, he was inducted into the Etobicoke Sports Hall of Fame. On February 14, 2015, he was presented with the Distinguished Service Award by Golf Canada for outstanding contributions to the game of golf in Canada. On March 9, 2016, he was inducted into the Canadian Curling Hall of Fame in the Builder category. On July 20, 2016, he was inducted into the Canadian Golf Hall of Fame as a Builder. He is the only person to be inducted into both the curling and golf halls. On January 26, 2017, he received the George Cumming Distinguished Service Award from the PGA of Canada, the association's most prestigious award.

== Books ==
Weeks has authored six books: The World's Greatest Golf Courses; The Brier: A History of Canada's Most Celebrated Curling Championship; Curling For Dummies (Volumes 1 and 2); Hurry Hard: the Russ Howard Story, which he co-authored with Russ Howard, Curling, Etcetera and Rock Star, which he co-wrote with Jennifer Jones. Rock Star was the No. 1 book on both the Toronto Star and Globe and Mail bestseller lists on August 30, 2025. He is a three-time winner of the Scotty Harper Award for the top curling story in Canada.

== History ==
Weeks grew up in Montreal -- Mount Royal, Quebec—but spent most summers in Prince Edward Island where his family's roots are located. A fifth-generation Canadian, Weeks' great-grandfather was one of the founders of the first golf course in PEI. His grandfather, Major-General Ernest Geoffrey Weeks, was a highly decorated military hero who went on to become Adjutant-General of the Canadian Forces.

A graduate of Richview Collegiate Institute in Toronto and the University of Windsor (Hons. BA—Communications), he lives in Toronto.
