= List of works by Peter Dickinson =

The following list is of the completed works of British-Canadian architect Peter Dickinson.

Name	City	Address	Designed	Completed	Status
Alexander Muir School	Toronto	108 Gladstone Avenue		1952	
Canadian Red Cross Society	Toronto			1952	Demolished
Humber Valley Village School	Etobicoke	65 Hartfield Road		1952	
B and T Metals	Toronto		1953		
Lyndwood Public School	Mississauga	498 Hartsdale Avenue	1953	Now Janet I. MacDougald PS	
Prince Edward District Collegiate Institute	Picton	41 Barker Street	1952	1953	
Bernard Stainman House	North York	89 Bayview Ridge		1953	Demolished
	Toronto	111 Richmond Street West	1950	1954	
Hogan Pontiac Buick	Toronto		1953	1954	Demolished
Midland-Penetanguishene District High School	Midland		1954		
Toronto Teachers' College	Toronto	951 Carlaw Avenue East	1952	1954	Now Story Arts Centre, Centinnel College
West Glen Public School	Etobicoke	47 Crowley Avenue	1952	1954	
Babcock-Wilcox and Goldie McCulloch	Galt		1952	1955	
Benvenuto Place	Toronto	1 Benvenuto Place	1951	1955	
Beth Tzedec Synagogue	Toronto	1700 Bathurst Street	1951	1955	
Juvenile and Family Court	Toronto	311 Jarvis Street	1954	1955	
Lawrence Heights Apartments	Toronto		1955		
Royal Bank Building	Toronto	170 University Avenue	1954	1955	Demolished
	Toronto	561 Avenue Road	1955	1956	
Brading Breweries Limited	Toronto	247 Davenport Road	1955	1956	Altered Beyond Recognition
London Teachers’ College	London		1955	1956	
Mutual Life Insurance Building	Toronto	500 University Avenue	1956	1956	
Oxton-Oriole Apartments	Toronto	240 Oriole Parkway	1954	1956	
Orillia District Collegiate Institute Addition	Orillia	273 West Street North	1956		
Regent Park South Apartments	Toronto	Dundas Street	1955	1956	Demolished
Wawanesa Mutual Insurance Company	Toronto	1819 Yonge Street	1955	1956	Demolished
Women's Building (now Queen Elizabeth Building)	Toronto	Exhibition Place	1955	1956	
York Mills Collegiate Institute	North York	490 York Mills Road	1955	1956	
Church Street Public School	Toronto	83 Alexander Street		1957	
John G. Althouse Middle School	Toronto	130 Lloyd Manor Road	1957		
Police Building	Ottawa	60 Walter Street	1954	1957	
Park Plaza Hotel Addition	Toronto	4 Avenue Road	1956	1957	Altered Beyond Recognition
Smith Corona	Scarborough		1957		
Trinity Anglican Church Parish Hall	Barrie	24 Collier Street	1957		
Westbury Hotel	Toronto	475 Yonge Street	1952	1957	
Workmen's Compensation Board	North York	Highways 400 and 401		1957	Demolished
	Toronto	55 Yonge Street	1956	1958	
Sandringham Apartments	Ottawa	85 Range Road	1958	1958	
Sidney Robins House	North York	28 The Bridle Path		1958	Demolished
Burle Yolles House	North York	89 The Bridle Path		1958	Demolished
Walter Zwig House	North York	42 The Bridle Path		1958	
	Toronto	500 Avenue Road	1955	1959	
	Montréal	1420 Rue Sherbrooke Ouest	1958	1959	Façade altered beyond recognition
Continental Can Company	Toronto	790 Bay Street		1959	
Trans-Canada Pipeline Building	Toronto	150 Eglinton Avenue East		1959	
	Toronto	48 Yonge Street		1960	
	Toronto	801 Bay Street	1956	1960	Demolished
Côte St. Luc Apartments	Montréal			1960	
Education Centre	Toronto	155 College Street	1956	1960	
Elm Ridge Golf and Country Club	Île Bizard	851 Chemin Cherrier	1958	1960	
Glenview Park Secondary School	Cambridge	55 McKay Street		1960	
Lawrence Heights Junior High	North York	50 Highland Hill		1960	
Capri Apartments	Hamilton	640 Mohawk Road East		1960	
North Toronto Medical Building	North York	250 Lawrence Avenue West	1960	1960	
O'Keefe Centre	Toronto	1 Front Street East	1957	1960	with Earle C. Morgan
Ottawa Builders' Exchange	Ottawa	196 Bronson Avenue		1960	
Perini Office Addition	Toronto			1960	
Isadore Sharp House	North York	36 Green Valley Road		1960	
Sisters of Notre Dame	Cornwall			1960	
Tweedsmuir Apartments	Toronto	310/320 Tweedsmuir Avenue		1960	Demolished
A.C. Nielsen Building	Toronto	39 Wynford Drive		1961	Two floors added
Four Seasons Motor Hotel	Toronto	415 Jarvis Street		1961	Demolished
Loyola College, Drummond Science Block	Montréal	7272 Rue Sherbrooke Ouest		1961	
Ontario Hospital Association	Toronto	24 Ferrand Drive		1961	Demolished
Prudential Building	Toronto	4 King Street West		1961	
Regis College	North York	3425 Bayview Avenue (19 Ballyconnor Crescent)	1958	1961	Demolished
St. Regis Apartments	Montréal	2555 Avenue Benny		1961	
William G. Miller School	Toronto	60 Bennett Road		1961	
Bank of Commerce Building	Montréal	1155 Boulevard René-Lévesque Ouest	1957	1962	
Telegram Building	Toronto	444 Front Street West	1958	1963	
Inn on the Park	Toronto	1095 Leslie Street	1961	1963	Demolished
Juliana Apartments	Ottawa	100 Bronson Avenue		1963	
Waldorf Apartments	Montréal	3404 Avenue Prud'homme		1963	
Embassy Row Apartments	Montréal	1545 Avenue du Docteur-Penfield		1964	
