= JGA =

JGA may refer to:

- Japan Golf Association
- John G. Althouse Middle School
- Justice Guild of America
- Juxtaglomerular apparatus
- Nihon Ki-in (Japan Go Association)
- Jamnagar Airport IATA code
