= Andy Andreoff =

Canadian ice hockey player (born 1991)

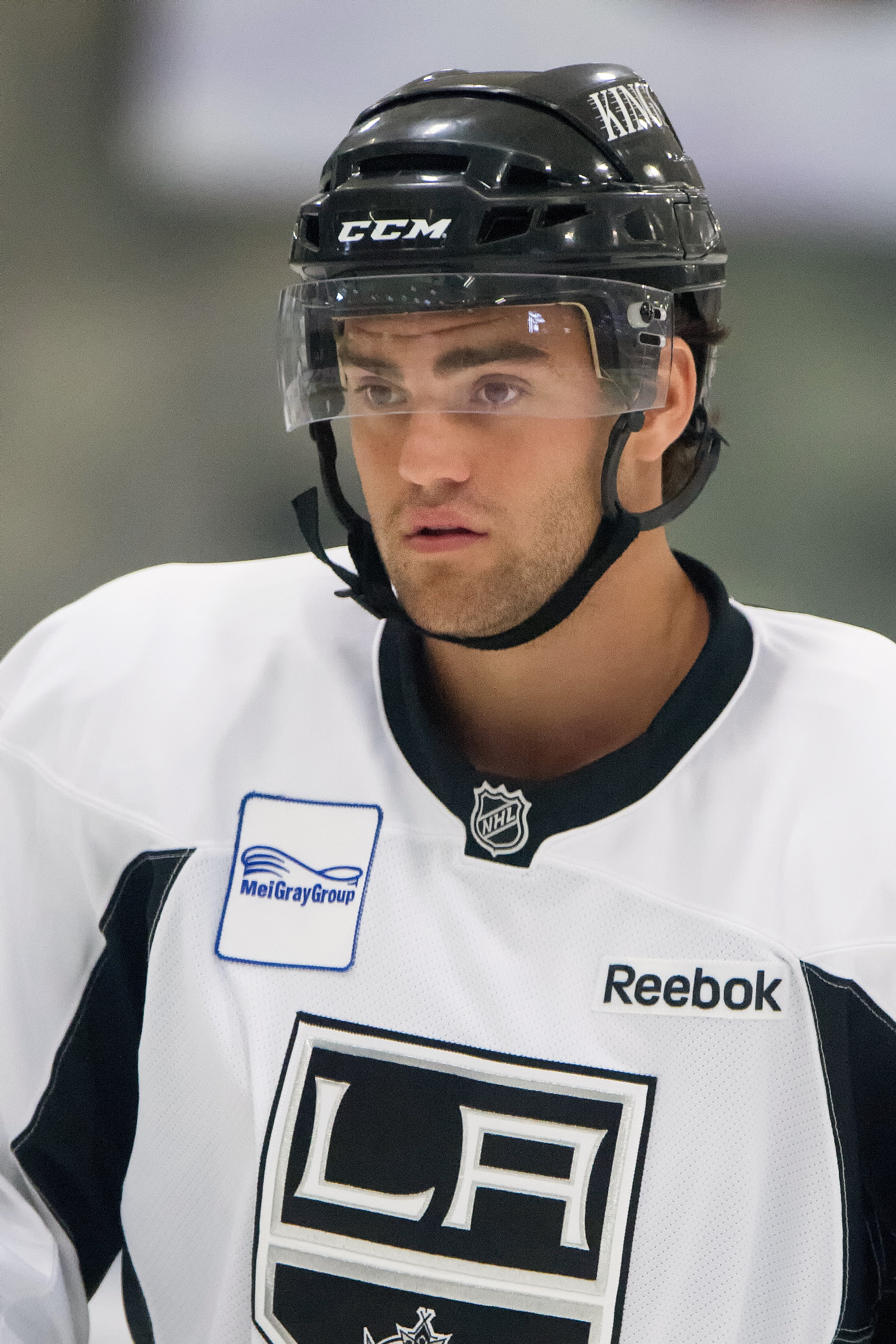
- Andreoff with the Los Angeles Kings in 2012
- Born: May 17, 1991 (age 35) Pickering, Ontario, Canada
- Height: 6 ft 1 in (185 cm)
- Weight: 209 lb (95 kg; 14 st 13 lb)
- Position: Left wing
- Shoots: Left
- team Former teams: Free agent Los Angeles Kings; Philadelphia Flyers; New York Islanders; Sibir Novosibirsk; ZSC Lions
- NHL draft: 80th overall, 2011; Los Angeles Kings
- Playing career: 2012–present

Andy Andreoff (born May 17, 1991) is a Canadian professional ice hockey player who is currently an unrestricted free agent. Andreoff was selected by the Los Angeles Kings in the third round (80th overall) of the 2011 NHL entry draft.

== Early life ==
Andreoff was born on May 17, 1991, in Pickering, Ontario, Canada, to mother Kathy and is of Macedonian descent.

== Playing career ==
=== Amateur ===
Growing up in Pickering, Andreoff attended Vaughn Willard Public School and played with the Ajax-Pickering minor midget Raiders while attending St. Mary Catholic Secondary School. He was drafted in the fifth round of the 2007 Ontario Hockey League (OHL) Entry Draft by the Oshawa Generals. Andreoff played five seasons of major junior hockey with the Generals, scoring 81 goals and 126 assists for 207 points, while earning 312 penalty minutes, in 281 games played.

In his first full year of major junior hockey during 2008–09, Andreoff skated in 66 games and scored 11 goals with 14 assists. The team finished fourth in its division and missed the OHL playoffs. He was ranked 168th amongst North American skaters by the NHL Central Scouting Bureau s final rankings and was not selected in the 2009 NHL entry draft. The following year, Andreoff experienced a breakout sophomore season in which he recorded 48 points. He credited his uptake in scoring to his coaches who told him to "be more aggressive." In spite of his efforts, the Generals once again failed to qualify for the OHL playoffs, finishing fourth in the East Division.

Andreoff topped his sophomore season during the Generals' 2010–11 campaign by recording a new career-high 33 goals and 42 assists. This garnered the attention of the Los Angeles Kings who drafted him 80th overall in the 2011 NHL entry draft. He had not expected to be drafted and found out while watching the draft listening for his friends' names. By the conclusion of the 2010–11 season, Andreoff earned a scholarship to attend Durham College and received the teams' Eric Lindros Top Forward Award. Prior to the beginning of the following season, Andreoff signed a three-year entry-level contract with the Kings on October 13, 2011, before being loaned back to the Generals. He was also named an assistant captain alongside Scott Valentine, Christian Thomas, and captain Boone Jenner.

Andreoff at Los Angeles Kings development camp in July 2013

=== Professional ===
Upon concluding his major junior career, Andreoff was reassigned to the Kings' American Hockey League (AHL) affiliate, the Manchester Monarchs, for the remainder of the season on an amateur tryout agreement. After attending the Kings' 2012 training camp, he was reassigned to the Monarch for his first full professional season. During the 2012–13 season, Andreoff recorded 13 goals with 13 assists in 69 games while collecting a team-leading 111 penalty minutes. As a result, the Monarchs finished third in the Atlantic Division but lost in the first round against the Springfield Falcons.

Andreoff participated in the Kings' development camp in the summer of 2013, before playing the 2013–14 season for the Monarchs. Andreoff played 76 games and scored 11 goals with 24 assists in 2013–14.

Prior to the 2014–15 season, Andreoff was re-signed to a new one-year contract with the Kings on July 14, 2014. After attending the Kings' training camp, he made his NHL debut on October 14 against the Edmonton Oilers. On March 17, 2015, Andreoff recorded his first career goal, which turned out to be the game winner, in a 1–0 win over the Arizona Coyotes.

On June 24, 2017, the Kings re-signed Andreoff to a two-year, $1.355 million contract worth $677,500 annually. On June 13, 2018, Andreoff was traded to the Tampa Bay Lightning in exchange of Peter Budaj. He played with their AHL affiliate, the Syracuse Crunch, for the 2018–19 season and did not feature in a game with the Lightning.

Andreoff signed a two-year, $1.5 million contract as an unrestricted free agent with the Philadelphia Flyers on July 1, 2019. On September 20, 2021, Andreoff was signed to a one-year contract by the New York Islanders. He was then placed on waivers by the Islanders on October 6, 2021.

Following his second season within the Islanders organization in 2022–23, Andreoff mutually terminated the remaining year of his contract with New York after he was placed on unconditional waivers on July 6, 2023.

As a free agent, Andreoff signed his first contract abroad in agreeing to a one-year deal with Russian club, Sibir Novosibirsk of the Kontinental Hockey League (KHL), on July 10, 2023.

In July 2025, Andreoff signed a two-year contract with the ZSC Lions in the Swiss National League (NL). Andreoff missed the start of the season due to an injury and has only played 19 of the 32 championship games scoring 3 (2+1) points. On December 22, ZSC Lions announced that the contract had been terminated by mutual consent.

On December 31, 2025 it was reported that Andreoff returned to Sibir Novosibirsk of the KHL. Andreoff finished the 2025–26 season with Sibir, tallying six goals and two assists in 21 games in the regular season and one goal and one assists in five games in the 2026 Gagarin Cup playoffs.

On August 1, 2026 it was announced that Andreoff and Sibir Novosibirsk mutually agreed to terminate his contract. His future in professional hockey is currently unclear.

== Career statistics ==
			Regular season					Playoffs
Season	Team	League	GP	G	A	Pts	PIM	GP	G	A	Pts	PIM
2007–08	Pickering Panthers	OPJHL	40	12	15	27	58	—	—	—	—	—
2007–08	Oshawa Generals	OHL	25	0	1	1		9	0	0	0	2
2008–09	Oshawa Generals	OHL	66	11	14	25	37	—	—	—	—	—
2009–10	Oshawa Generals	OHL	67	15	33	48	70	—	—	—	—	—
2010–11	Oshawa Generals	OHL	66	33	42	75	109	10	3	8	11	16
2011–12	Oshawa Generals	OHL	57	22	36	58	88	6	1	3	4	4
2011–12	Manchester Monarchs	AHL	5	1	0	1	4	4	2	0	2	2
2012–13	Manchester Monarchs	AHL	69	13	13	26	111	4	0	3	3	0
2013–14	Manchester Monarchs	AHL	76	11	24	35	133	4	1	2	3	2
2014–15	Los Angeles Kings	NHL	18	2	1	3	18	—	—	—	—	—
2014–15	Manchester Monarchs	AHL	7	5	5	10	11	—	—	—	—	—
2015–16	Los Angeles Kings	NHL	60	8	2	10	76	1	0	0	0	0
2016–17	Los Angeles Kings	NHL	36	0	2	2	70	—	—	—	—	—
2017–18	Los Angeles Kings	NHL	45	3	6	9	50	—	—	—	—	—
2018–19	Syracuse Crunch	AHL	75	26	29	55	150	4	1	0	1	2
2019–20	Lehigh Valley Phantoms	AHL	39	11	7	18	35	—	—	—	—	—
2019–20	Philadelphia Flyers	NHL	14	0	1	1	2	—	—	—	—	—
2020–21	Philadelphia Flyers	NHL	6	0	0	0	9	—	—	—	—	—
2020–21	Lehigh Valley Phantoms	AHL	3	2	0	2	7	—	—	—	—	—
2021–22	Bridgeport Islanders	AHL	60	18	24	42	57	6	0	1	1	4
2021–22	New York Islanders	NHL	6	1	0	1	0	—	—	—	—	—
2022–23	Bridgeport Islanders	AHL	69	37	28	65	64	—	—	—	—	—
2022–23	New York Islanders	NHL	3	0	1	1	0	—	—	—	—	—
2023–24	Sibir Novosibirsk	KHL	66	27	12	39	47	—	—	—	—	—
2024–25	Sibir Novosibirsk	KHL	64	22	16	38	34	7	2	2	4	8
2025–26	ZSC Lions	NL	19	2	1	3	12	—	—	—	—	—
2025–26	Sibir Novosibirsk	KHL	21	6	2	8	31	5	1	1	2	9
NHL totals			188	14	13	27	225	1	0	0	0	0
KHL totals			151	55	30	85	112	12	3	3	6	17
