= John G. Althouse Middle School =

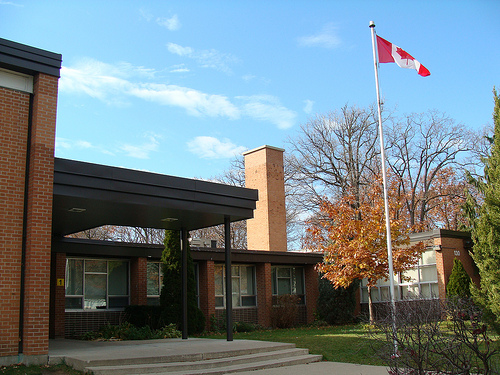

Location
- 130 Lloyd Manor Road; Etobicoke, Toronto, Ontario, M9B 5K1; Canada

Information
- School type: Middle School
- Founded: November 4, 1957
- School board: Toronto District School Board
- Superintendent: Alison Gaymes San Vicente
- Area trustee: Dan MacLean
- School number: 283738
- Principal: Kimberly Lee
- Grades: 6 to 8
- Enrollment: 556 (Fall 2008)
- Language: English
- Area: Martingrove Road and Princess Margaret Boulevard
- Colours: Purple and Gray
- Mascot: Jaguar
- Team name: John G. Althouse Jaguars
- Website: schoolweb.tdsb.on.ca/johngalthouse/
- Last updated: October 17, 2023

John G. Althouse Middle School (JGA) is a middle school located in the Etobicoke area of Toronto, Ontario, near the intersection of Lloyd Manor Road and Princess Margaret Boulevard. Graduates of John G. Althouse mostly go to Martingrove Collegiate Institute, Richview Collegiate Institute, or Etobicoke Collegiate Institute for their secondary education. Historically, graduates have also attended Burnhamthorpe Collegiate Institute.

== History ==
John G. Althouse Middle School opened on November 4, 1957, to 380 pupils. The school is named after Dr. John G. Althouse, who was the Chief Director of Education for the Province of Ontario from 1944 to 1956.

== Academics ==
=== Gifted program ===
John G. Althouse has been home to a gifted education program since 1996, when it was transferred to the school from Islington Junior Middle School.

=== Music program ===
John G. Althouse has a music program in which every student is required to play an instrument, either in band or strings. Each February, John G. Althouse students participate in the Kiwanis Music Festival.

The school organizes the Toronto Summer Music Camp, which takes place at either Albion Hills Outdoor Education Centre or Mono Cliffs Outdoor Education Centre.

== Extracurricular Activities ==
=== Instrumental music ===
John G. Althouse's Stage Band has won the first place provincially as the best middle school jazz band. The band has previously performed in New York City, New Orleans, and Chicago.

The school's Chamber Strings has won first place in the Provincials as best middle school ensemble.

=== Vocal music ===
In 2014, John G. Althouse's Chamber Choir won first prize at the Provincials Competition (Ontario Music Festivals Association) and was invited to the Nationals Competition, a first for any John G. Choir.

The school's Jazz Choir has previously performed in New York, New Orleans, Chicago, The Air Canada Centre (Raptors game) as well as The Rogers Centre (Blue Jays game). In 2014, The Jazz Choir performed on the flight deck of USS Intrepid in New York City. Additionally, The Jazz Choir earned a high score of 94 in the Kiwanis music festival in 2016, the highest mark ever achieved by any elementary jazz ensemble.

== Notable alumni ==
- The 22nd Prime Minister of Canada, Stephen Harper enrolled at JGA during the mid 1970s; attended the school's 50th Anniversary on May 4, 2008
- Actor Kiefer Sutherland, best known for his portrayal of Jack Bauer on the television series 24
- Tim Bethune, Canadian sprinter who competed in the men's 400 metres at the 1984 Summer Olympics
- Brittany MacLean, Olympian, won a bronze medal in the women's 4 × 200 m freestyle relay at the 2016 Summer Olympics
