= Northern Secondary School =

Location
- 851 Mount Pleasant Road; Toronto, Ontario, M4P 2L5; Canada; 43°42′38.17″N 79°23′24.42″W

Information
- School type: Secondary School
- Motto: The Pride, The Spirit. "Hail Dear Old Northern"
- Founded: September 1930
- School board: Toronto District School Board
- Superintendent: Jennifer Chan
- Area trustee: Stacey Cline
- School number: 930768
- Principal: Adam Marshall
- Grades: 9–12
- Enrolment: 1,770 (2021–2022)
- Schedule type: Semestered
- Colour: Red Gold Blue
- Mascot: Red Knight
- Team name: Red Knights
- Website: schoolweb.tdsb.on.ca/northernss/
- Last updated: April 23, 2025

Northern Secondary School is a public high school in Toronto, Ontario, Canada. It teaches grades 9 through 12. It is a part of the Toronto District School Board (TDSB). Prior to Amalgamation of Toronto in 1998, it was within the Toronto Board of Education (TBE). The closest TTC transit station is Mount Pleasant. Northern has long-standing rivalries with nearby high-school North Toronto Collegiate Institute and also with Central Technical School, Lawrence Park Collegiate Institute, York Mills Collegiate Institute, and Leaside High School.

== History ==
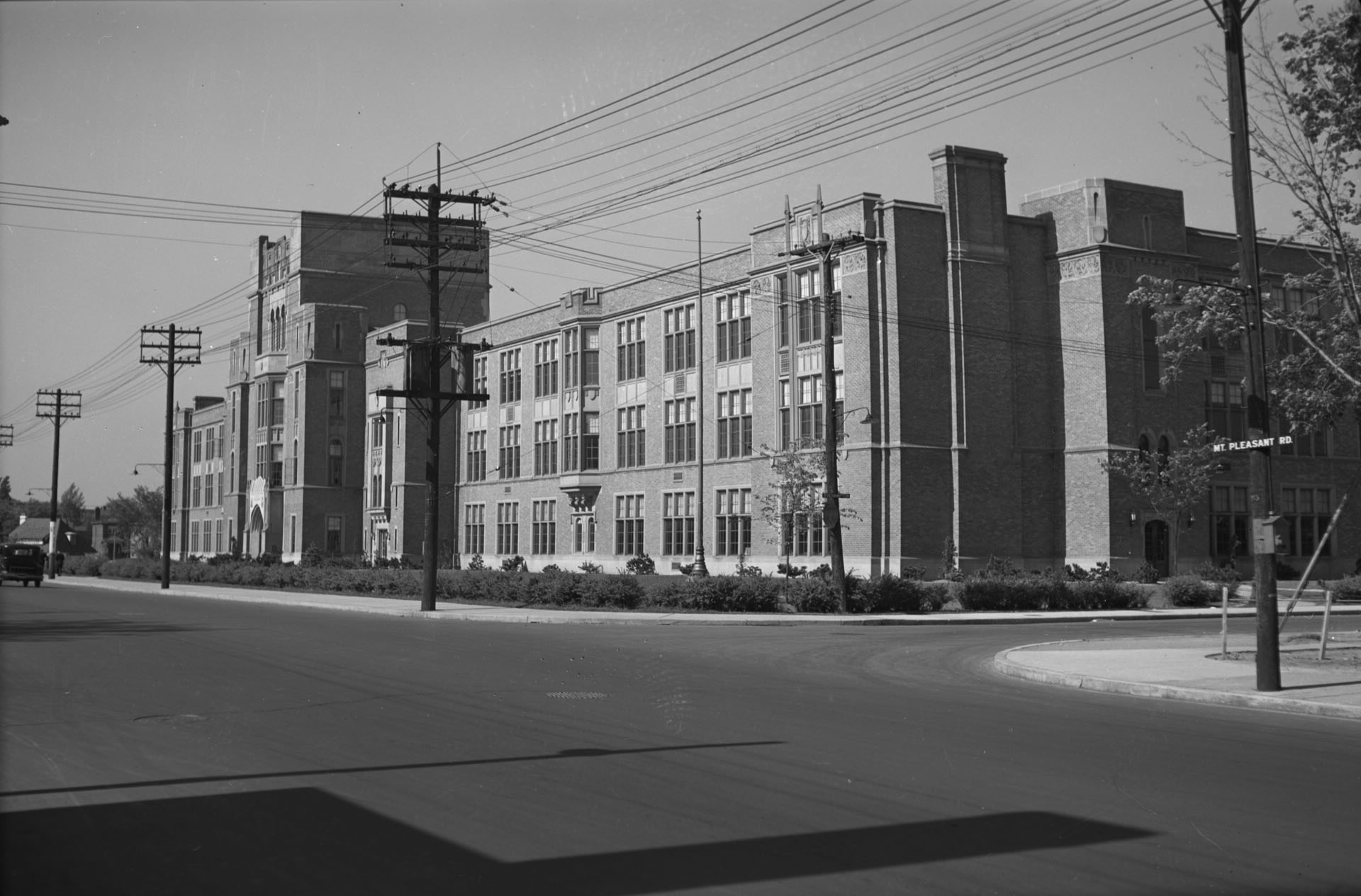
Front of the school in 1939

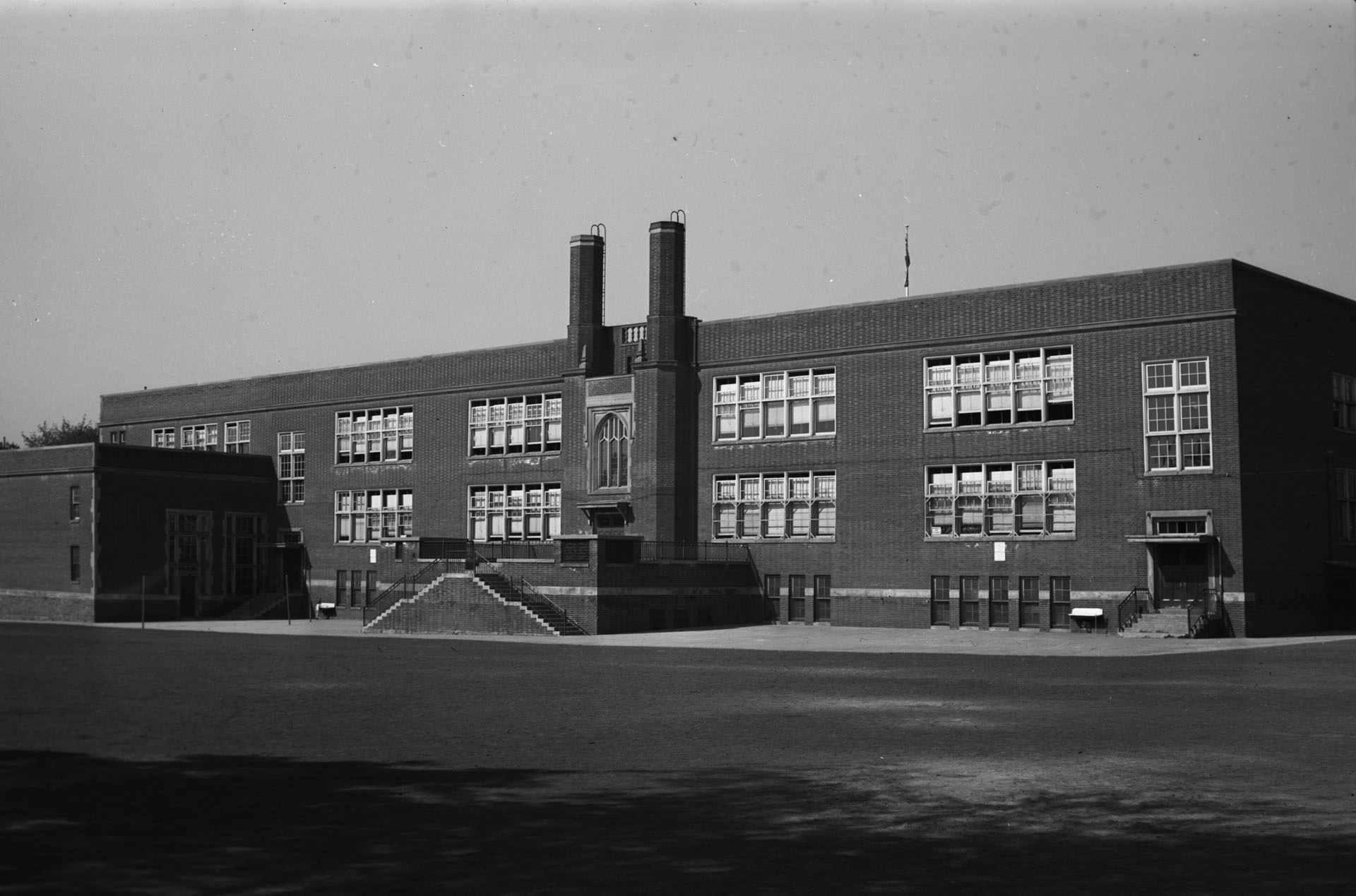
Back of the school in 1939

Founded in 1930, the school was originally known as "Northern Vocational School", until its twenty-fifth anniversary. At that point, the name was changed to "Northern Technical-Commercial", which lasted for three years until the present name, "Northern Secondary School", came into use because a definite district had been assigned for matriculation students.

Northern was the first Ontario school to have a student council. The school is a pilot site of a Toronto Police Service program that places on-duty police officers in schools. On May 13, 2016, it was alleged that a bomb was planted on the premises, and the school was shut down to investigate. No explosive devices were found.

Along with all other schools in Ontario, Northern was closed for in-person learning at various points during the COVID-19 pandemic.

== Architecture ==
Northern Secondary is built in the Collegiate Gothic style, has a floor space of about 121,317 square feet and contains one hundred and fifteen rooms. C.E.C. Dyson was the school's original architect. Although little is known about him, he was the school board's architect from 1921 until 1949. Northern is known for the grotesques which exist on the exterior, throughout the entrance foyer and inside the auditorium.

Further evidence of the Gothic Collegiate style can be found in the vaulted ceilings of the hallways, and the arched doorways and windows featured throughout the building. As stated on a plaque inside the main entrance, during the 1960s a major addition was built which significantly altered the rear of the school. These renovations changed little about the original parts of the building. Although once grand, over the decades, the facility has fallen into considerable disrepair and is in need of extensive renovation.

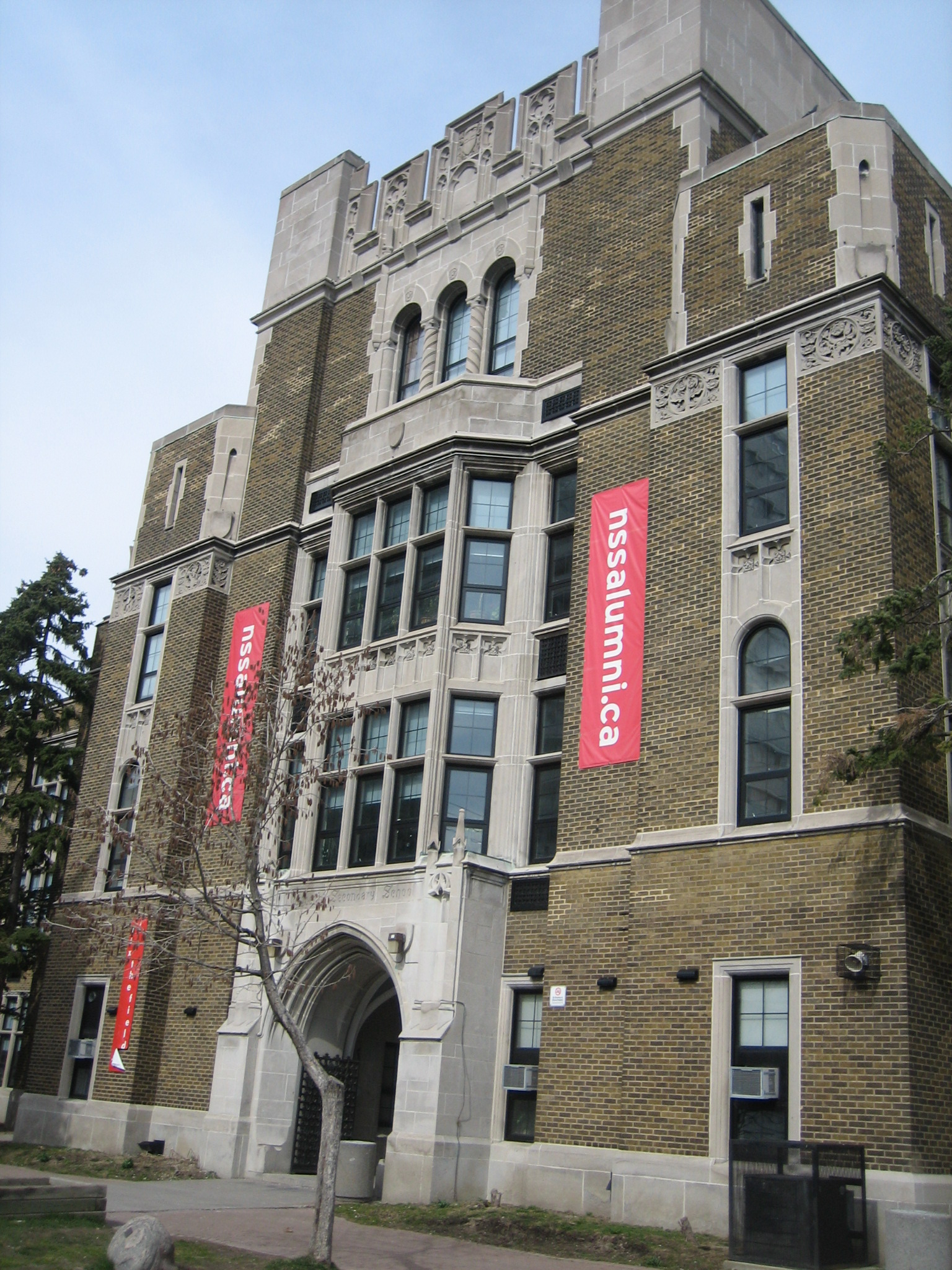
The main entrance

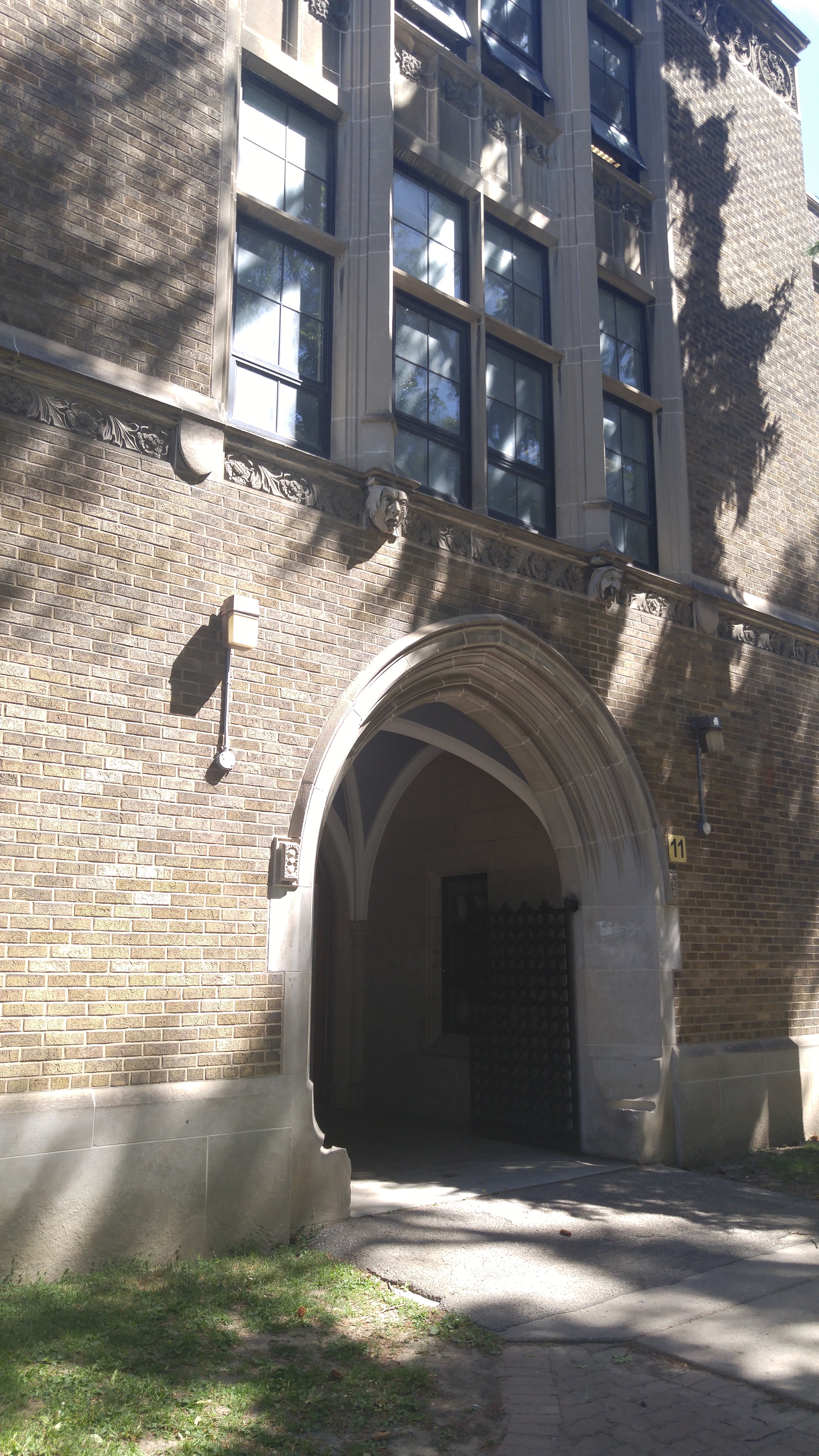
An arched side entrance

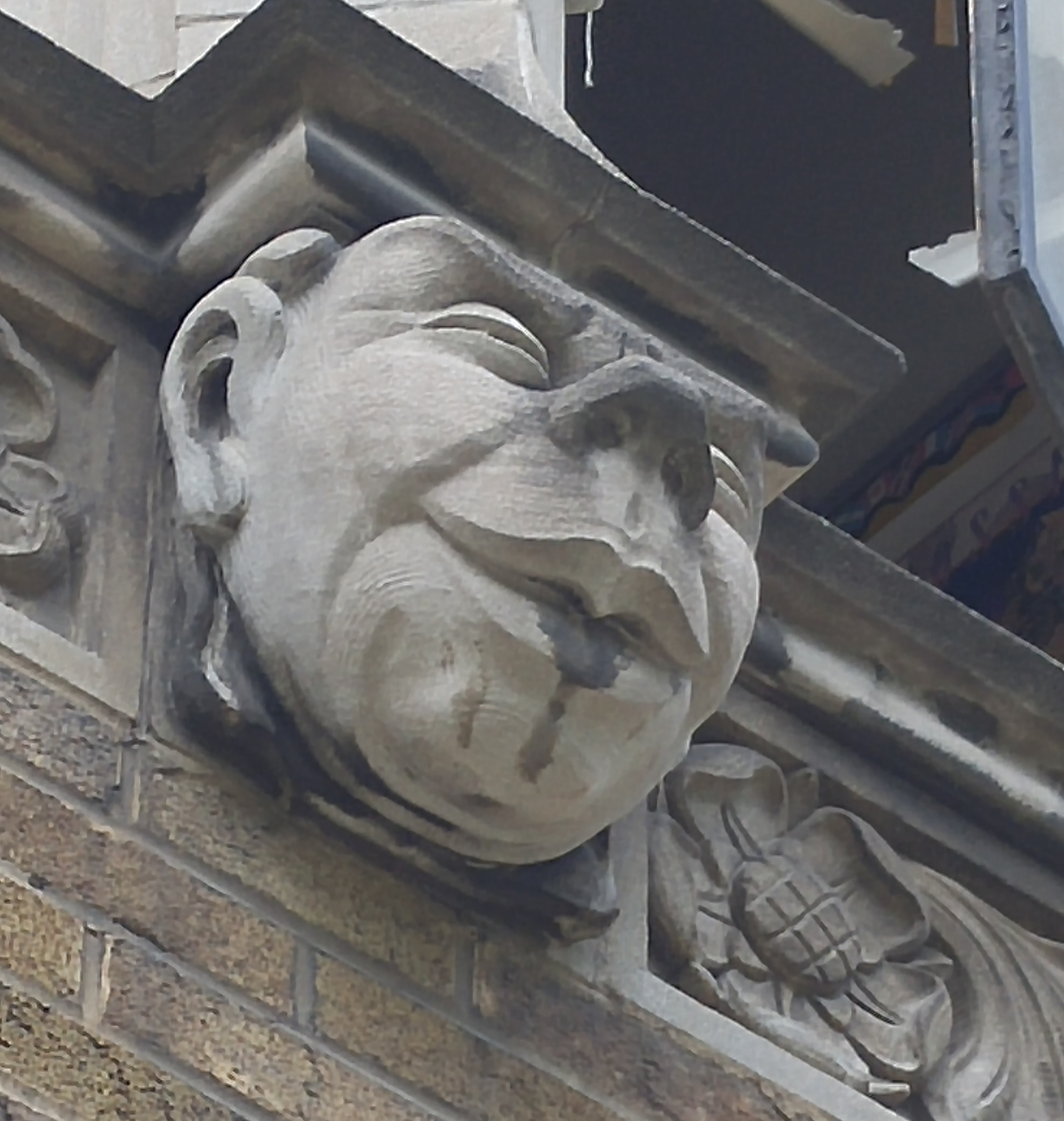
An exterior grotesque

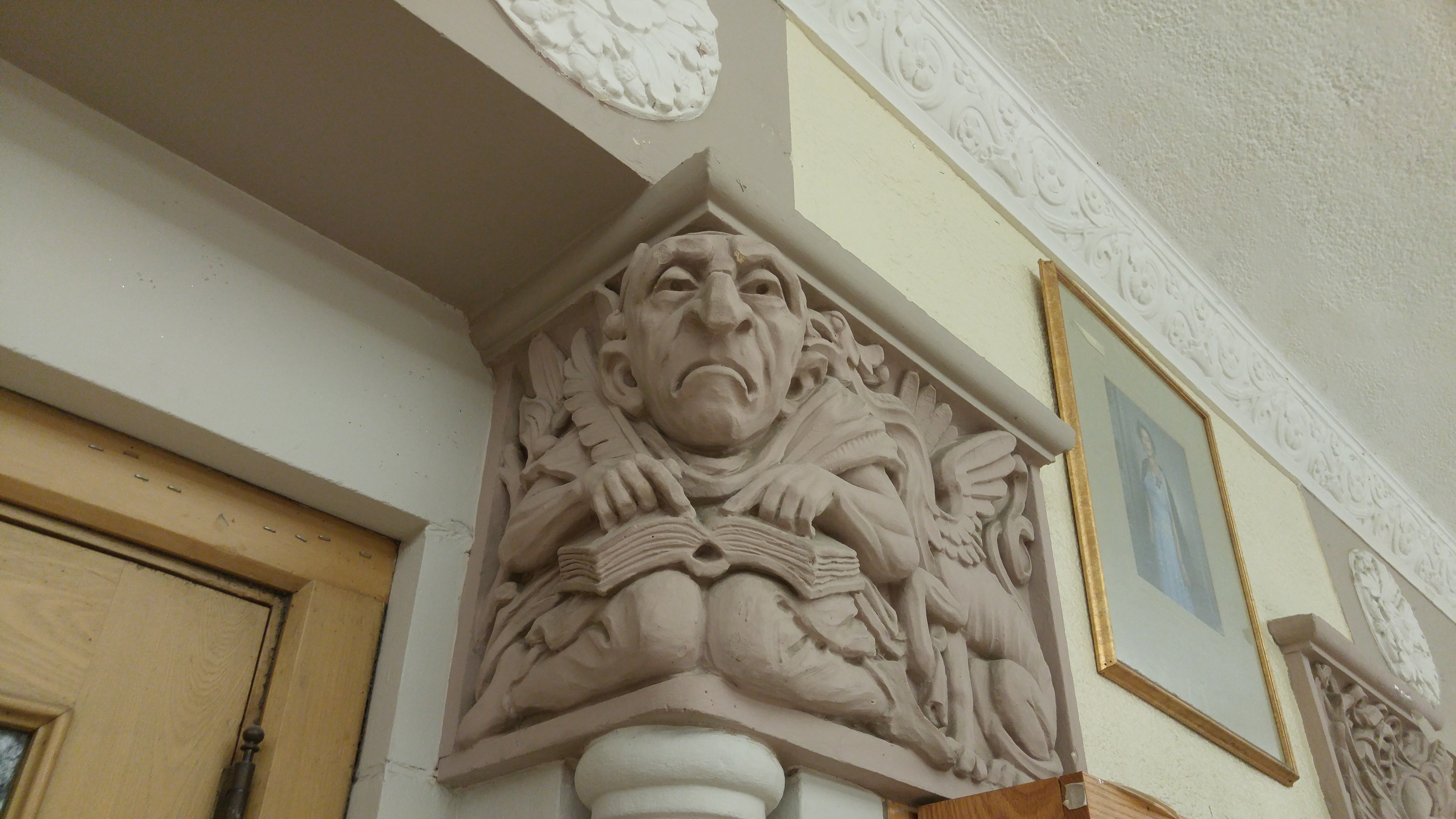
An interior grotesque

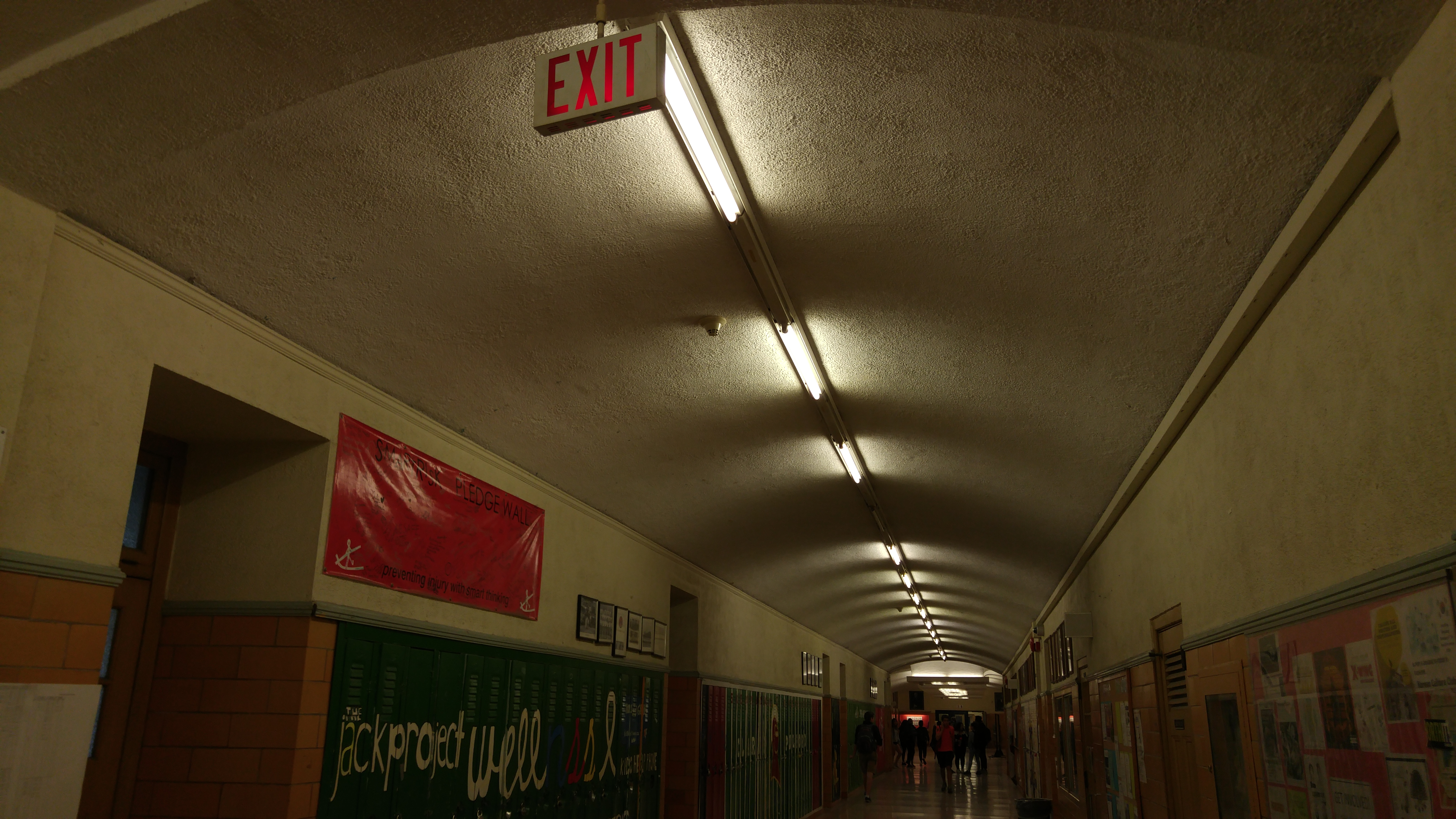
A vaulted hallway ceiling

== Academics ==
Northern has a gifted program / enriched program and a range of elective courses, including an art department. The school runs a selective admissions process, as well as optional attendance lotteries. There is a large variety of gifted courses available at all grade levels and AP courses available at the grade 11 and 12 levels.

Each year, Northern's students obtain over $1 million in university scholarships.

Northern's students have won numerous national & international awards in multiple academic disciplines. These include the NASA space settlement competition, the World Debates at Oxford, England, and the Canadian Association of Physicists national contest. Northern debaters are also the current reigning OSDU provincial debate championships.

The school has over 50 active clubs, associations and committees, as well as over 120 teachers, resulting in a 15 to 1 student teacher ratio.

A large proportion of the school’s students have special learning needs and therefore are on an individual education plan (often referred to as an IEP)

Summer transition program: Northern Secondary School offers a Summer Transition program to incoming ninth grade students.

Northern Secondary school hosts their open house In late November, the most recent open house was hosted on November 27, 2025

== Sports ==
The school has over 50 varsity athletic teams. Northern's football team, the Red Knights, have won numerous titles in Toronto's high school league (including two Metro Bowls, and the first Toronto Bowl). A number of top players have gone on to join the Canadian Football League.

Numerous alumni of the school have also gone on to play in the National Hockey League, the Greek Basket League, Major League Soccer, the Israeli Premier League, the as well as the Rugby World Cup.

== In popular culture ==
The school has been used as a location for several films including Carrie (2013 film), as well as Jarvis Collegiate Institute, and Resident Evil: Apocalypse, which were filmed inside the school. The academic decathlon scene of Billy Madison was filmed in the school's auditorium. The 2009 documentary Fight for the Planet was also filmed at the school.

Numerous commercials have also been filmed on the school's premises.

== Charity ==
Northern has a long history of supporting national & international charities, with over 40 years of participation in the United Way fundraisers for poverty alleviation. The school has been the top fundraiser amongst Toronto high schools for a number of years.

== Notable alumni and staff ==
Alumni of the school include one Academy Award winner, a member of the Rock and Roll Hall of Fame, holders of the Order of Canada, as well as Grey Cup and Stanley Cup champions, a Spitfire pilot who played a key role in an escape from a German prison camp by Allied airmen which is remembered today as "The Great Escape", and a prominent Hebrew Bible scholar. Painter Lawren P. Harris taught at then Northern Vocational. Jazz Shukla represented Canada at the Paris Olympic 2024.

== See also ==
- Education in Ontario
- List of secondary schools in Ontario
