= Markham District High School =

Public school in Ontario, Canada

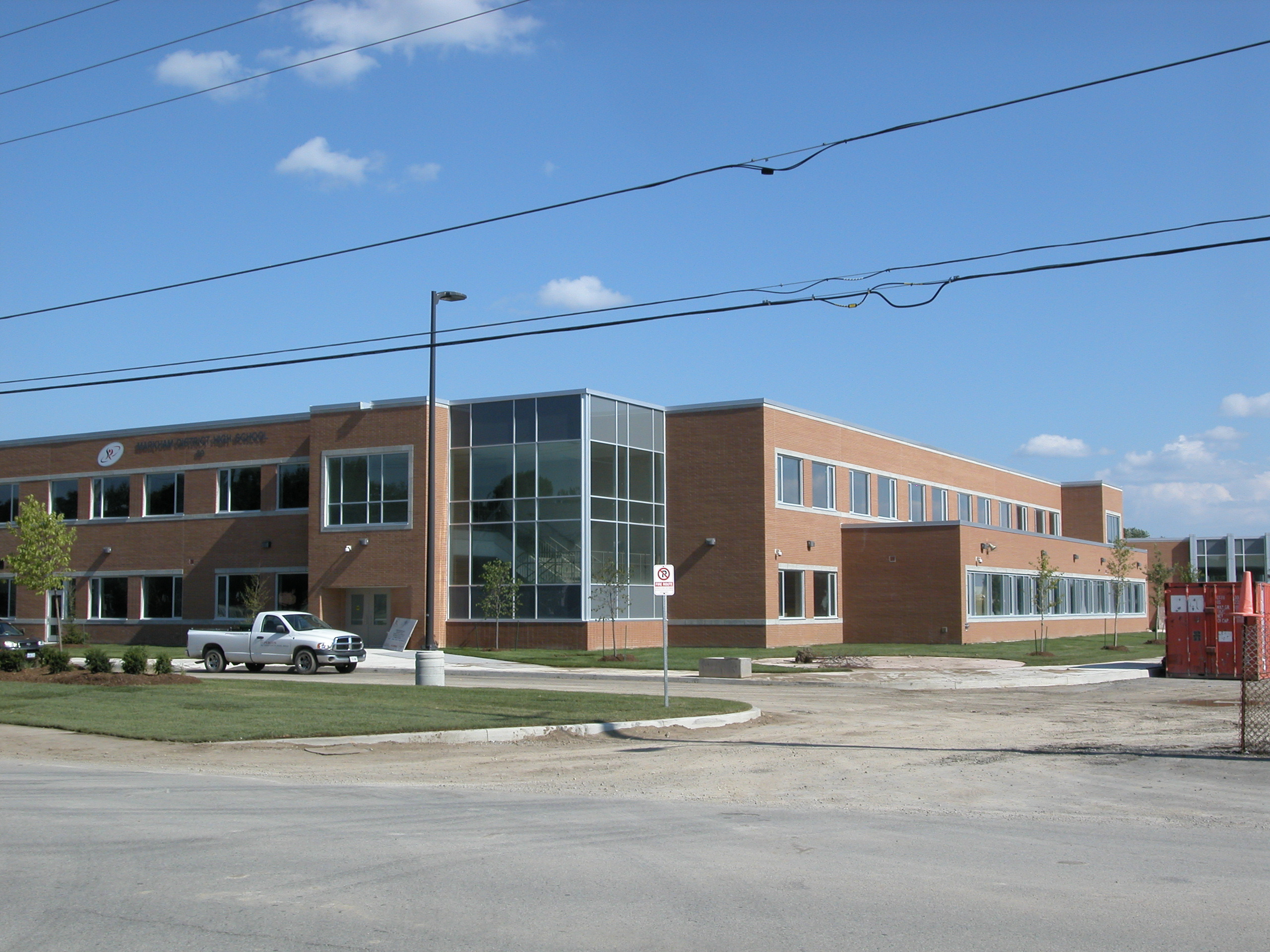

Location
- 89 Church Street; Markham, Ontario, L3P 2M3; Canada; 43.8799°N 79.2505°W

Information
- Type: Public
- Religious affiliation: Secular
- Founded: 1858; 168 years ago 1954 (current form)
- School board: York Region District School Board
- Superintendent: Kien Nam Luu
- Area trustee: Allan Tam
- Principal: Kathy McAlpine
- Grades: 9–12
- Enrolment: 1,522 (October 2025)
- Language: English
- Mascot: Maxx the Marauder
- Website: www.yrdsb.ca/schools/markhamdistrict.hs

Markham District High School (MDHS) is a public high school in the city of Markham, Ontario, Canada. Founded in 1858, it is a secular school. As of October 2025, the school had 1,522 students enrolled.

== Governance ==
It is one of 32 high schools in the York Region District School Board. Until the 2016–17 academic year, it was the only publicly funded school within York Region which had a non-semestered system. In the 2016–17 academic year, the school switched to a semestered system.

== History ==
Markham District High School was the first school in Markham. Secondary school education officially began in Markham, in January 1858, which was then called Markham Village Grammar School. Prior to 1858, higher education was found in Toronto (Home District Grammar School). Since there was not a school building, quarters were rented in Temperance Hall at Franklin and George Streets, on the site now occupied by the Markham Lawn Bowling Club. After the passage of the Act to Improve the Common and Grammar Schools of the Province of Ontario in 1871 a permanent home was opened at the southeast corner of Joseph Street and Albert Street (today's 55 Albert Street) as the Markham Village High School in 1879. Additions were added in 1892 to provide more space. Markham High School also took students who attended Agincourt Continuation School and wanted to complete their matriculation (grades 11 to 13) from 1915 until 1930, when Agincourt High School was formed.

The year 1952 marked the establishment of the present Markham High School District, which comprises approximately the south-east half of Markham. In April 1953, the then York County School Board began construction of the school building on the southside of Church Street east of Mount Joy Creek began. In September 1954, a modern, three hundred pupil Secondary School was opened. The old site on Albert Street became the new home of the Markham Union Masonic Lodge and converted to commercial space in 2009. In July, 1964, construction was started on a vocational addition, which would make the Markham District High School a fully composite school. This was occupied in September 1965. Two years later more accommodation was needed, and the latest addition was opened in January 1970. This building was used until the end of the 2009–10 school year, after which it was torn down. The enrolment for 1971–72 in this large, well-equipped composite school is approximately eighteen hundred students. In 1971 the school transferred to the York Region Board of Education and York Region District School Board in 1998.

In 2006, the York Region District School Board identified Markham DHS as a candidate replacement school based on building and program renewal requirements. Board staff met with school staff in September 2006 to describe the process to replace Markham DHS. Board staff met with interested members of the community in April 2007 to describe the phasing plan and preliminary Site Plan and the process to replace Markham DHS.

The Board decided to replace Markham DHS with a new school that accommodates 1,400 students. The opening of Bur Oak Secondary School in 2007 was to reduce the number of students served by Markham DHS. The construction of the new school would allow students within the permanent boundary and the existing gifted program continued attendance into the future. The phasing of construction activities for the new school (on the site of the former sports field) also allowed occupancy of the existing building until the new school building was completed. The site plan was approved in the Spring of 2008, and construction began shortly after.

In the year 2010, the new school and present building was completed and the old one was torn down and re-purposed as greenspace. The greenspace consists of a walking trail, small garden and picnic tables.

== Curriculum ==
=== Classics Department ===
Markham District High School is one of the 60 schools remaining in Ontario with a classics department. The school offers Latin levels 1 - 3 (equivalent to grades 10 - 12) as well as the grade 12 'Classical Civilization' course. Until the 2010–11 academic year the school also offered Ancient Greek from levels 1 - 3 but dropped it due to lack of interest.

== Sports and extracurricular activities ==
The Markham Marauders is the official sports team, best known for football and basketball.

=== Canadian football ===
The Markham Marauders are the first team in York Region to win the Metro Bowl. They defeated Birchmount Park 19–0 in the 2009 Metro Bowl. played at the Rogers Centre in Toronto.

=== Curling ===
The Markham Marauders boys curling team has been YRAA champions and OFSAA participants for the past four years. Notably, the 2007–08 team finished 4th out of the 20 teams entered at OFSAA in Peterborough.

In addition, the 1986 Markham Marauders boys curling team were YRAA champions and runner up at OFSAA.

The Markham Marauders girls curling team won the 2013–14 YRAA championships and represented the school at OFSAA in Brampton where they also finished 4th out of the 20 teams entered.

Both of the Markham Marauders curling teams (boys and girls) won the 2015–16 YRAA championships and represented the school at OFSAA in Northbay in March 2016.

=== Other sports ===
During the 1980s, the Marauders were the dominant school in handball, winning several regional and provincial titles.

The Markham Marauders girls flag football team winning YRAA many years in a row. They won OFSAA in the 2015–2016 school year.

The Markham Marauders junior boys volleyball team won a YRAA championship in 2019.

=== Music ===
A number of regularly occurring music ensembles exist at Markham District High School. They include:

- Grade 9 Band
- Grade 10 Symphonic Band
- Grade 10 Jazz Band
- Grade 11 Wind Symphony
- Grade 12 Wind Symphony
- Grade 11/12 Festival Winds
- Opus One
- Monday Morning Blues Band
- Church Street Swing Machine
- Washington Tour Band
- International Tour Band
- Senior Clarinet Quintet
- Sax ensemble
- Trombone Choir
- Coolinets
- Percussion Ensemble
- Junior Flute Quartet
- Senior Flute Quartet
- Junior Wind Quintets
- Intermediate Wind Quintet
- Senior Wind Quintet
- Jazz Combo
- Junior Vocal
- Senior Vocal
- Resonance
- Chamber Choir
- Third Stream
- Guitar Ensemble
- Tuba Herd
- Senior Clarinet Ensemble

== Campus ==
A new school was built over time on two of the school's fields (front fields, leaving one field at the back), and was planned to open for the 2009/2010 academic year, but due to the students wanting the metal shops to remain in the school, plans were delayed. They broke ground in early November 2008, and opened the school in time for the 2010/2011 academic year. Currently, the projected number of people for that year is to be 1650, a drop of about 450 students from the 2006/2007 year. This will occur as a result of another high school's (Bur Oak Secondary School) territory overlapping with Markham District's current boundaries. The school fields are now located to the rear of the old school site.

== Admissions ==
Markham District High School is the 'home' secondary school for people within the following area. Students within the English public system in the following zone would go to Markham District unless they are enrolled in a special program or special circumstances apply. The boundaries are the City of Markham within the following zone:

- Commencing at the intersection of 16th Avenue and Robinson Creek
- Easterly on said avenue till Ninth Line.
- Southerly along said line till Highway 7.
- Easterly along said highway till the city's eastern boundary at York-Durham Line.
- Southerly along said line till the city's southern boundary at Steeles Avenue East.
- Westerly along said avenue till Ninth Line.
- Northerly along said line till the CN Rail Tracks
- North-westerly along said tracks till Markham Road.
- Northerly along said road till Highway 407
- Easterly along said highway till Rouge River
- Easterly, Northerly, and Westerly along said river till Main Street Markham South
- Northerly along said street till Highway 7.
- Westerly along said Highway till Robinson Creek.
- Generally northerly along said creek till the point of commencement.

=== Feeder schools ===
- William Berczy Public School (gifted program only)
- Parkland Public School (gifted program only)
- Donald Cousens Public School (gifted program only)
- Ashton Meadows Public School (gifted program only)
- David Suzuki Public School
- Parkview Public School
- Boxwood Public School
- Legacy Public School
- E.T Crowle Public School
- Reesor Park Public School
- William Armstrong Public School
- Franklin Street Public School

The students attending the Gifted Program in elementary school living anywhere in Markham will go to Markham District to continue their gifted education.

== Notable alumni ==
Brendan Gaunce

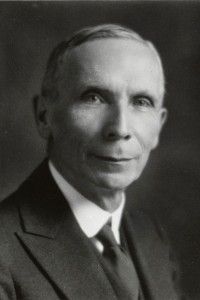
Clarence Chant

=== Sports ===
- Steve Thomas (1963- ), NHL ice-hockey player and assistant coach of Tampa Bay Lightning
- Brad May (1971- ), NHL ice-hockey player
- Sean Morley a.k.a. Val Venis (1971- ), WWE wrestler
- Tammy Sutton-Brown (1978- ), WNBA basketball player
- Mike Tuck (1983- ), Pro basketball player
- Shamawd Chambers (1989- ), CFL football player
- Cameron Gaunce (1990- ), NHL ice-hockey player
- Matt Coates (1991- ), CFL football player
- Jeff Skinner (1992- ), NHL ice-hockey player
- Tremaine Harris (1992- ), 2012 Olympic sprinter
- Brendan Gaunce (1994- ), NHL ice-hockey player

=== Arts and media ===
- Geoff Keighley (1979- ), video-game journalist
- Jason "Human Kebab" Parsons, disc jockey
- Celine Song, Academy Award-nominated director and playwright
- David West Read, television writer, playwright, actor and producer
- Gayle Ye, Emmy Award-winning Director of Photography

=== Politics ===
- Frank Scarpitti (1960- ), mayor of Markham

=== Other ===
- Clarence Chant (1865-1956), astronomer and co-founder of David Dunlap Observatory
- Karl Brooks Heisey (1895-1937), mining engineer and executive

== See also ==
- Education in Ontario
- List of secondary schools in Ontario
