= Etobicoke Collegiate Institute =

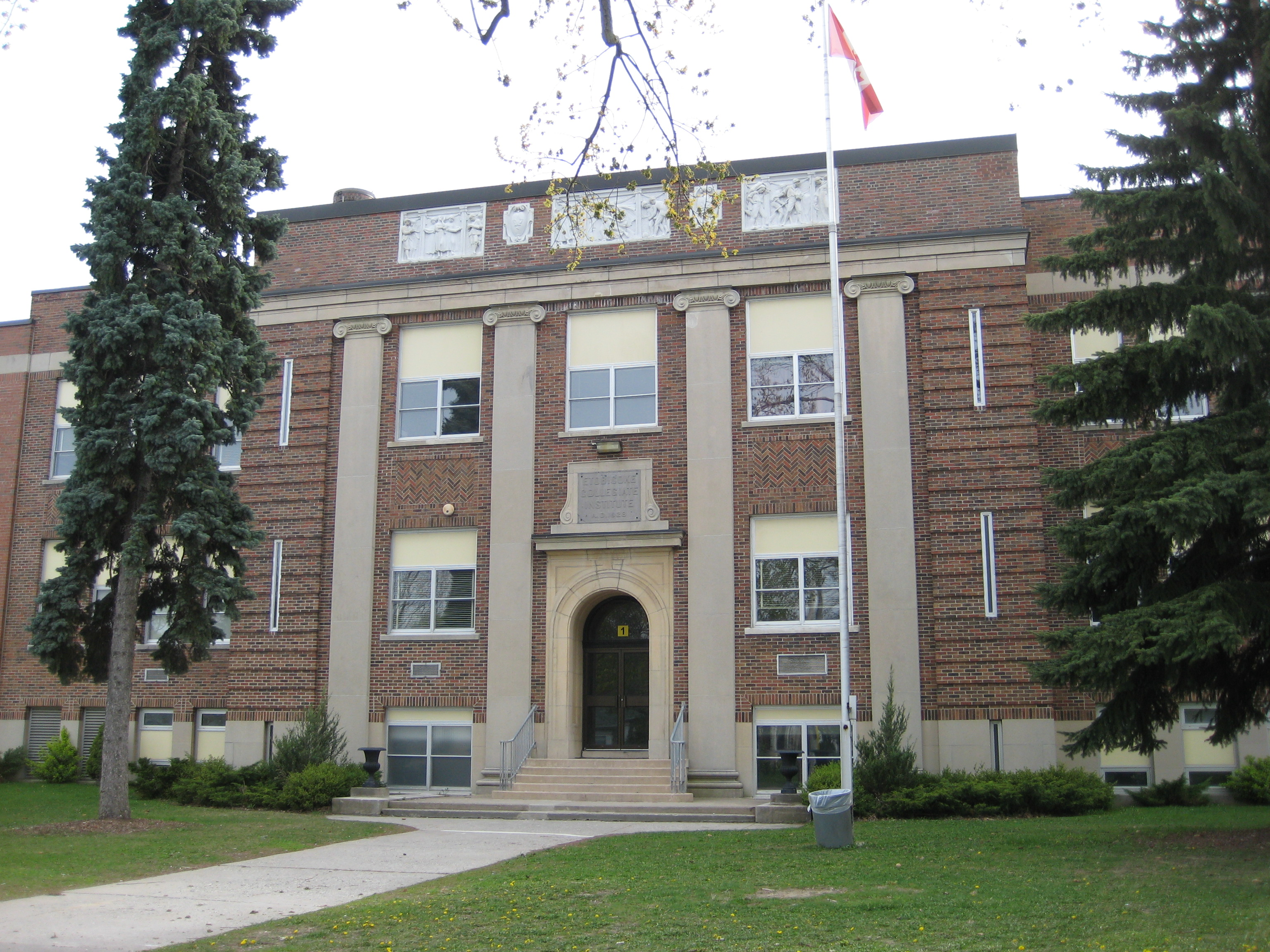
- Etobicoke C.I.'s facade and main entrance, in 2010

Location
- 86 Montgomery Road; Toronto, Ontario, M9A 3N5; Canada; 43°39′0.73″N 79°31′20.74″W

Information
- Former name: Etobicoke High School (1928–1949)
- Type: Public High School
- Motto: Semper Ad Meliora (Always Towards the Better)
- Religious affiliation: Secular
- Founded: 1928
- School board: Toronto District School Board (Etobicoke Board of Education)
- School district: Etobicoke
- Superintendent: Harpreet Ghuman
- Area trustee: Dan MacLean; Ward 2
- School number: 2802 / 909572
- Principal: Jennifer Kurtz
- Staff: 105
- Grades: 9-12
- Enrolment: 1390 (2023-24)
- Schedule type: Semestered
- Colors: Garnet, green and gold
- Athletics conference: TDSAA, OFSAA-"AAAA"
- Mascot: Ram (Ruckus the Ram)
- Team name: Etobicoke Rams
- Website: schoolweb.tdsb.on.ca/etobicokeci

Etobicoke Collegiate Institute (ECI, Etobicoke CI), previously known as Etobicoke High School, is a high school in Toronto, Ontario, Canada. It is located in the Islington neighbourhood of the former suburb of Etobicoke. It is overseen by the Toronto District School Board. The school was founded in 1928 and was part of the former Etobicoke Board of Education until 1998.

== History ==
Etobicoke High School was founded in the fall of 1928. It is one of Toronto's oldest schools and the first and traditionally central school for Etobicoke, having celebrated its 75th anniversary in 2003. The school was renamed to Etobicoke Collegiate Institute in 1949.

The 1928 entrance is an example of Art Deco architecture. The high school has about 1,450 students and over 100 teachers. Etobicoke Collegiate Institute is also the second-surviving high school in Etobicoke after the now-defunct Mimico High School (whose building now houses John English Junior Middle School).

E.C.I's traditional rivals are Richview Collegiate Institute, about 2 kilometres (1.2 mi) north. The two schools compete in football and other sports and share a somewhat similar socioeconomic demographic.

The school building has been a shooting location for a few films and commercials, including Mean Girls in 2003 and the made-for-television movie Young Again, starring Keanu Reeves, in 1986.

The Etobicoke Collegiate Institute extracurricular activity list stretches from music to most sports to Eco Club, Social Justice Club and Intereact.

Etobicoke Collegiate's Student Administrative Council is made up of 10 elected student leaders.

== Athletics ==
- Fall Sports: Basketball, Football, Cross Country, Tennis, Golf, Volleyball
- Winter Sports: Ice Hockey, Swimming, Badminton, Basketball, Volleyball, Curling
- Spring Sports: Soccer, Baseball, Softball, Track and Field, Ultimate Frisbee, Lacrosse

== Notable alumni ==
- Harold Shipp Canadian businessman, philanthropist and the chairman of Shipp Corporation Limited.
- Ken Dryden, former Montreal Canadiens goaltender and former President of the Toronto Maple Leafs; former Member of Parliament
- Jeff Healey, rock musician
- Jeff Johnson, Toronto Argonauts running back
- David Clarkson (ice hockey) National Hockey League for the New Jersey Devils, Toronto Maple Leafs, and Columbus Blue Jackets
- Marnie McBean, gold medallist rower, Canadian Senator since 2023
- Peter Milczyn, city councillor in Toronto, Ontario, Canada, representing one of the two Etobicoke—Lakeshore wards
- Lisa Ray, actress, model
- Donald Smythe, four time national badminton champion, Thomas Cup player, All-England Championships 1953 finalist
- Chris Stockwell, former cabinet minister in Mike Harris's Progressive Conservative government in Ontario and Speaker of the Ontario Legislature

== See also ==
- Education in Ontario
- List of secondary schools in Ontario
