= Donald A. Wilson Secondary School =

Location
- 681 Rossland Road East; Whitby, Ontario, L1P 1Y1; Canada; 43.893°N 78.964°W

Information
- School type: Public high school
- Founded: 2004
- School board: Durham District School Board
- Area trustee: Niki Lundquist, Scott Templeton, Christine Thatcher
- Principal: James Klodnicki
- Grades: 9–12
- Enrolment: 1,435 (2020/2021)
- Language: English, French
- Colours: Orange, blue and silver
- Mascot: Alligator
- Feeder schools: Captain Michael VandenBos Public School, Jack Miner Public School, Robert Munsch Public School, Williamsburg Public School, Meadowcrest PS (French immersion), Brooklin Village PS (French immersion)
- Website: donaldawilsonss.ddsb.ca

Donald A. Wilson Secondary School is a high school located in Whitby, Ontario, Canada. Opened in 2004, the school hosts students in grades 9-12 and offers a wide range of academic and extra-curricular activities. The school mascot is an alligator and the school colours are orange, blue, and silver. It is adjacent to All Saints Catholic Secondary School.

== Athletics ==
Donald A. Wilson Secondary School offers a fairly wide range of sports teams including football, golf, lacrosse, association soccer, hockey, baseball, badminton, basketball, skiing, track and field, and cross country.

== Clubs ==
Donald A. Wilson Secondary School offers a variety of student-led clubs including DECA, HOSA, Environment Club, and Student Council.

== Notable alumni ==
- Taylor Lord, Canadian soccer player
- Greg Morris, Canadian football player
- Mitch Wilde, Canadian lacrosse player

== See also ==
- Education in Ontario
- List of secondary schools in Ontario
