= Agincourt Collegiate Institute =

Public high school in Toronto, Ontario, Canada

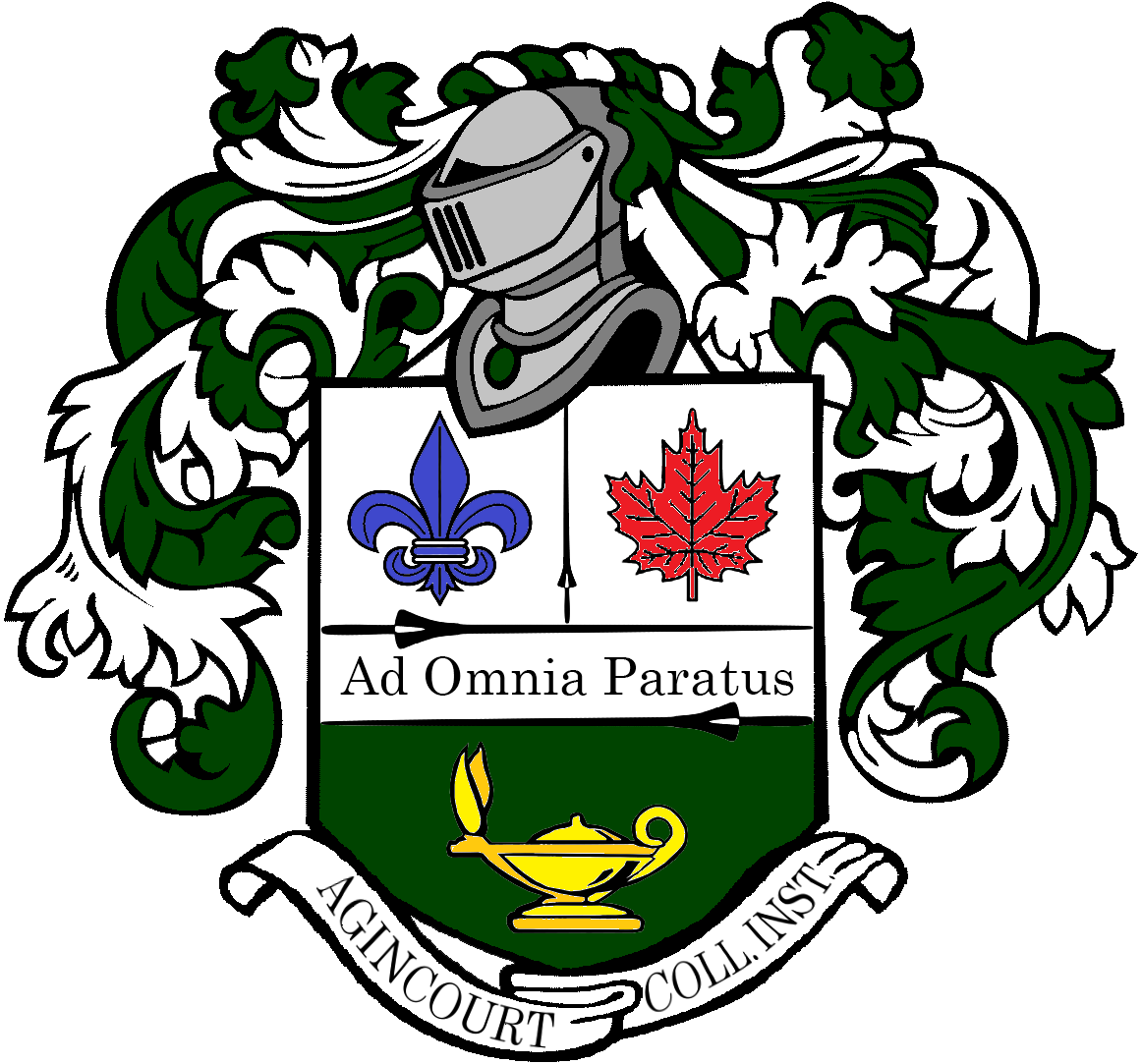

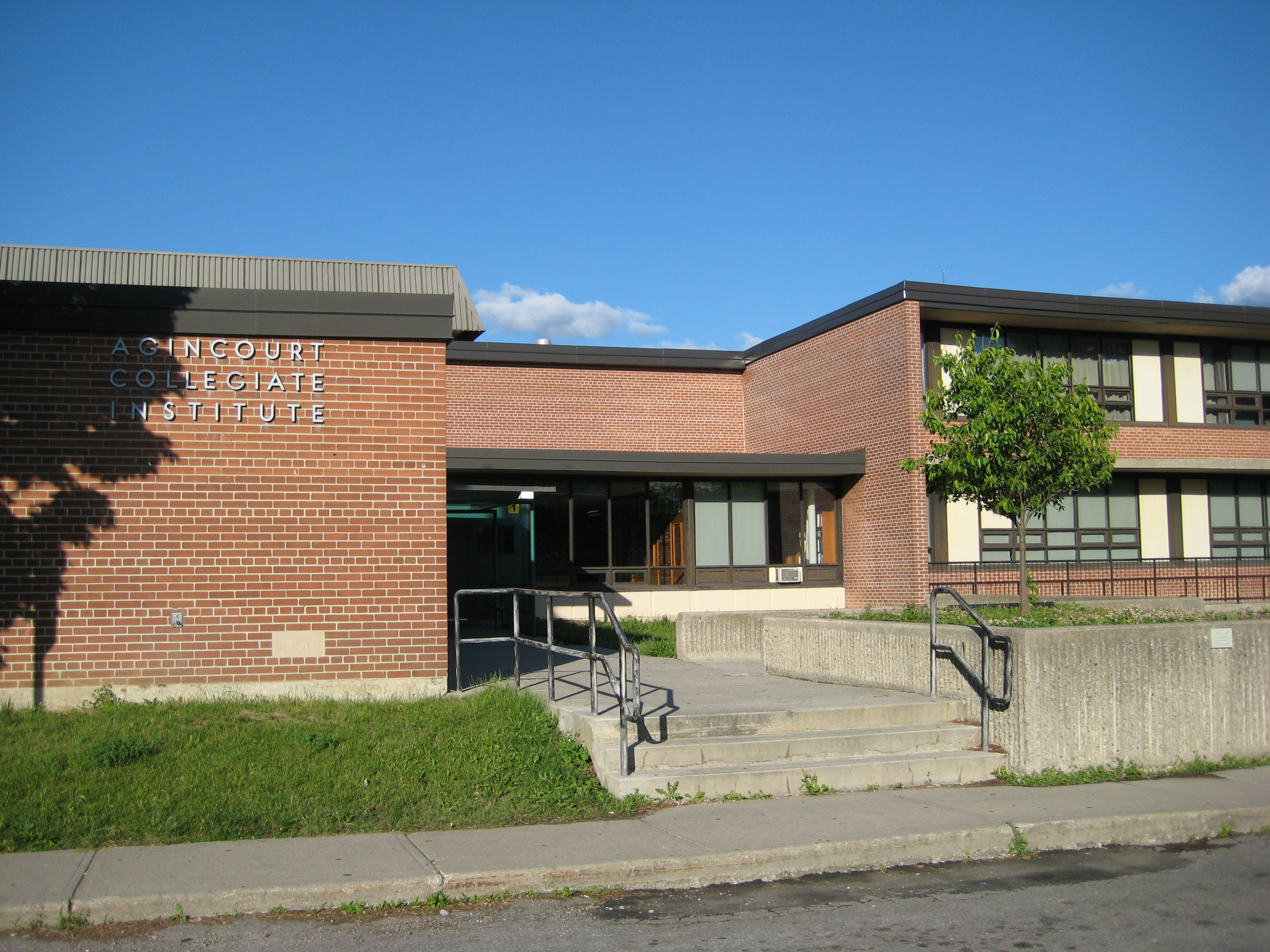
- The current Agincourt Collegiate building, constructed in 1956.

Location
- 2621 Midland Avenue; Toronto, Ontario, M1S 1R6; Canada; 43°47′20″N 79°16′45″W

Information
- Former names: Agincourt Continuation School (1915-1930); Agincourt High School (1930-1957)
- School type: Public high school
- Motto: Ad Omnia Paratus (Prepared for all things)
- Religious affiliation: none
- Founded: 1915
- School board: Toronto District School Board 1998-present; Scarborough Board of Education 1954-1997
- Superintendent: Elizabeth Addo; LN14
- Area trustee: Yalini Rajakulasingam; Ward 21
- School number: 4106 / 890722
- Principal: David Fewson
- Grades: 9–12
- Enrolment: 1,432 (02/04/26)
- Language: English, French
- Schedule type: Semestered
- Colours: Forest Green and white
- Mascot: Lancer
- Team name: Agincourt Lancers
- Website: schoolweb.tdsb.on.ca/agincourt/

Agincourt Collegiate Institute (known locally as ACI or Agincourt), formerly known as Agincourt High School and Agincourt Continuation School, is a secondary school in Toronto, Ontario, Canada. It is located in Agincourt, a neighbourhood in the former suburb of Scarborough. It was owned and operated by the Scarborough Board of Education prior to it being amalgamated into the Toronto District School Board in 1998.

A.C.I. is one of the oldest surviving secondary high schools in the former Scarborough in the north, the other being R. H. King Academy (formerly known as Scarborough High School/Collegiate Institute) in the south.

== History ==
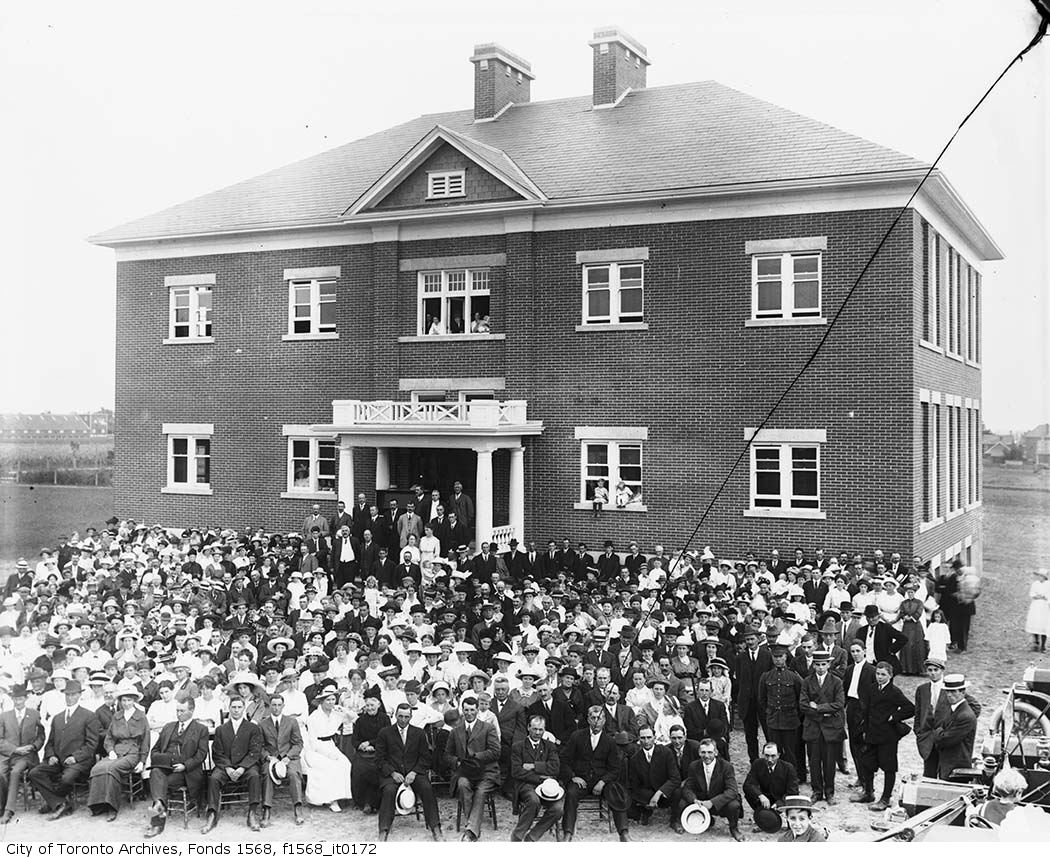
Agincourt Continuation School was on second floor of the Agincourt Public School from 1915 to 1929

The school, founded in 1915 as Agincourt Continuation School to provide part of the then secondary schooling in the Agincourt area (final years or junior/senior matriculation were done in Markham High School until 1930). Until 1929 it was housed on the second floor in what is now Agincourt Junior Public School building on the west side of Midland Avenue north of Sheppard Avenue.

With the opening of Scarborough High School, the first traditional high school in Scarborough, in 1922, the school was evolved into Agincourt High School in 1930, with its first permanent home opened on the east side of Midland Avenue in 1929, a three floor brick building.

After the Scarborough Board of Education was formed in 1954, the second and current building replaced the second school in 1956. Agincourt High was re-established as Agincourt Collegiate Institute in 1957. The current ACI was built by the firm Craig, Madill, Abram and Ingleson. The 1929 building was demolished in 1966 to make way for the auditorium and second double gymnasium with a smaller single gym. Additional classrooms and shops were added later on.

Currently its feeder schools are Sir Alexander Mackenzie Senior Public School, Henry Kelsey Senior Public School, St. Bartholomew Catholic School, St. Elizabeth Seton Catholic School and Sir Ernest MacMillan Senior Public School. In September 2011, Emily Carr Public School with a grade 4 Extended French Programme which started in 2006, became another feeder school for Extended French students. However, in 1977, Francis Libermann Catholic High School opened for grades 9 and 10 residing in the ACI catchment area; though the school would not be fully funded until 1986.

ACI is located in the region of Agincourt, one of the most ethnically diverse communities in Scarborough. As of 2016, 39% of the student body speaks a primary language other than English at home as often as English, and 18% of its students speak mostly or only a language other than English.

Agincourt C.I. commemorated its 50th anniversary in 1965, 75th anniversary in 1990 and its centennial anniversary in 2015.

== Special programs ==
=== Advanced Placement Program (CLOSED) ===
Agincourt CI offers the advanced placement program for physics, chemistry, biology, statistics, calculus and vectors, and French since the beginning of September 2006. However, this was discontinued after the pandemic.

=== French Program ===
Agincourt also offers French Immersion and Extended French programs from Grades 9 through 12. (Note that: Agincourt is phasing the Extended French program out). Students have the opportunity of studying various subject areas such as français, arts dramatiques, arts visuels, éducation physique, mathématique, géographie, histoire, informatique. After accumulating the required number of credits, students receive an Immersion or Extended French Bilingual Certificate with possible honors.

=== Music Program ===
There are 12 performing ensembles at Agincourt C.I. as well as a music technology (MIDI) program. They are:

- Wind Ensemble - gr. 9–10
- Wind Symphony - gr. 10–12
- Concert Choir - gr. 9–10
- Agincourt Singers - gr. 10–12
- Concert Orchestra - gr. 9–10
- Symphony Orchestra - gr. 10–12
- Little Bit's O Jazz - gr. 9
- All That Jazz - gr. 9–10
- Double Time - gr. 11
- North East Jazz - gr. 11–12
- Junior Guitar Ensemble - gr. 10
- Senior Guitar Ensemble - gr. 11–12

=== Current Music Groups ===
Grade	Winds	Strings	Choir	Jazz
9	Wind Ensemble	Concert Orchestra	Concert Choir	Little Bits O' Jazz
10	Wind Ensemble	Concert Orchestra	Concert Choir	Xperiment
11	Wind Symphony	Symphony Orchestra	Agincourt Singers	Double Time
12	Festival Winds	Symphony Orchestra	Agincourt Singers	North East Jazz

=== Design, IT, Automotive, and Tech ===
Agincourt C.I. has a technology education department. Courses range from integrated technology to Robotics to animation/mechanical design, to computer science, to automotive technology. The school is also equipped with an in-school, 2-bay automotive workshop. In 2013, two students from the automotive classes won the Toronto Automotive Technology Competition. Agincourt is also home to their Award-winning FIRST Robotics Competition Team 1246 Skunkworks which competes at Ontario District FRC Events. The Robotics Program at Agincourt offers students an opportunity to explore the application of Mechanical Engineering at the grade 10,11 and 12 levels. A Specialist High Skills Major is offered in Manufacturing Engineering for Grade 11/12.

=== Specialist High Skills Major ===
Agincourt C.I. is one of the few schools in the GTA that offer the Specialist High Skills Major program for students with outstanding academic grades in a specialized field. Some mandatory courses such as a two credit or four credit co-op are required to graduate in the program. On completion, students enrolled in the program are honored with a red seal on their graduation diploma, representing the success they have achieved.

== Ottey Walk ==
Every year ACI holds a walk to remember Marsha and Tamara Ottey. Marsha, 19, was a track star at the school and had been awarded a track scholarship just weeks before she was murdered and Tamara, 16, was the star athlete of the ACI flag football team. The two young women were murdered by Marsha's ex-boyfriend in 1995 and starting the year after, the walk was held once a year every year in their memory. Although it is unclear when it stopped, the walk has not been hosted since 2021.

== Notable staff ==
- Jim Veltman is the former captain for the Toronto Rock, a team in the National Lacrosse League (NLL), For the 2004 NLL season, he was named league MVP. He was Awarded the nickname of "scoop" after he scooped his 2000th career loose ball.

== Accomplishments ==
- In 2012, two grade 12 students sent a Lego-man helium balloon into the atmosphere.
- In 2012, Louie Papathanasakis was named one of Canada's Outstanding Principals.

== Notable alumni ==
- Ted Barris, author and broadcaster.
- Jan Carinci, former CFL football player, member of the 1983 Grey Cup champions Toronto Argonauts
- Jim Carrey, actor and comedian (attended in grade 10)
- Anson Carter, former NHL player
- Bill Crothers, won a silver medal at the 1964 Summer Olympics, inducted into Canadian Olympic Hall of Fame (1965)
- Dean Dorsey, former CFL and NFL football player
- Michael Overs, founder of Pizza Pizza
- Bruce Simpson, former Olympian pole vaulter
- Sharone Vernon-Evans, professional volleyball player
- Killy, Musical Artist. Best known for hit song "Killamanjaro"

== See also ==
- Education in Ontario
- List of secondary schools in Ontario
