= St. Brother André Catholic High School =

Location
- 6160 16th Avenue East; Markham, Ontario, L3P 3K8; Canada; 43°53′35″N 79°15′32″W

Information
- School type: High school
- Motto: Open the door, Let in the light
- Religious affiliation: Roman Catholic
- Founded: 1985
- School board: York Catholic District School Board
- Superintendent: Jennifer Sarna
- Area trustee: Frank S.D Alexander
- Principal: Christine Cosentino
- Principal: Vice Principal: Deanna Lettieri
- Principal: Vice Principle: Robert Costabile
- Grades: 9-12
- Enrolment: 1419 (2020)
- Language: English
- Area: Eastern Markham and Whitchurch-Stouffville
- Colours: red, blue, gold
- Mascot: Cardinal
- Team name: Cardinals
- Website: www.ycdsb.ca/sba/

St. Brother André Catholic High School is a Catholic secondary school in Markham, Ontario, Canada. Grades 9 to 12 are taught, with religious studies included in the curriculum. It is named after Saint André Bessette (also known as Brother André), a 20th-century Catholic religious brother in Montreal responsible for the construction of the Saint Joseph's Oratory.

Brother André is located in east-central Markham, and its feeder schools include

- St. Kateri Tekakwitha CES
- San Lorenzo Ruiz Catholic Elementary School
- St. Edward CES
- St. Joseph CES (Markham)
- St. Julia Billiart CES
- St. Justin Martyr (Markham)
- St. Patrick CES (Markham)
- St. Mark CES (Stouffville)
- St. Brigid CES (Stouffville)
- St. Brendan CES (Stouffville)

== Fire ==
On April 28, 2010, a fire broke out at St. Brother André Catholic High School in the boys' washroom on the second floor. One person was treated for smoke inhalation and personal anxiety. Former principal Jim Nicoletti said that there was a "minor" investigation in progress by the York Regional Police.

== Notable alumni ==
- Steven Stamkos, professional ice hockey centre and team captain for the Tampa Bay Lightning of the National Hockey League (NHL)
- Michael Del Zotto, professional ice hockey defenseman for the Anaheim Ducks of the National Hockey League (NHL)
- Mena Massoud, actor who played Aladdin in Disney's live-action remake of Aladdin.
- Andrew Lue, former professional football player for the Montreal Alouettes of the Canadian Football League (CFL)

== Gallery ==
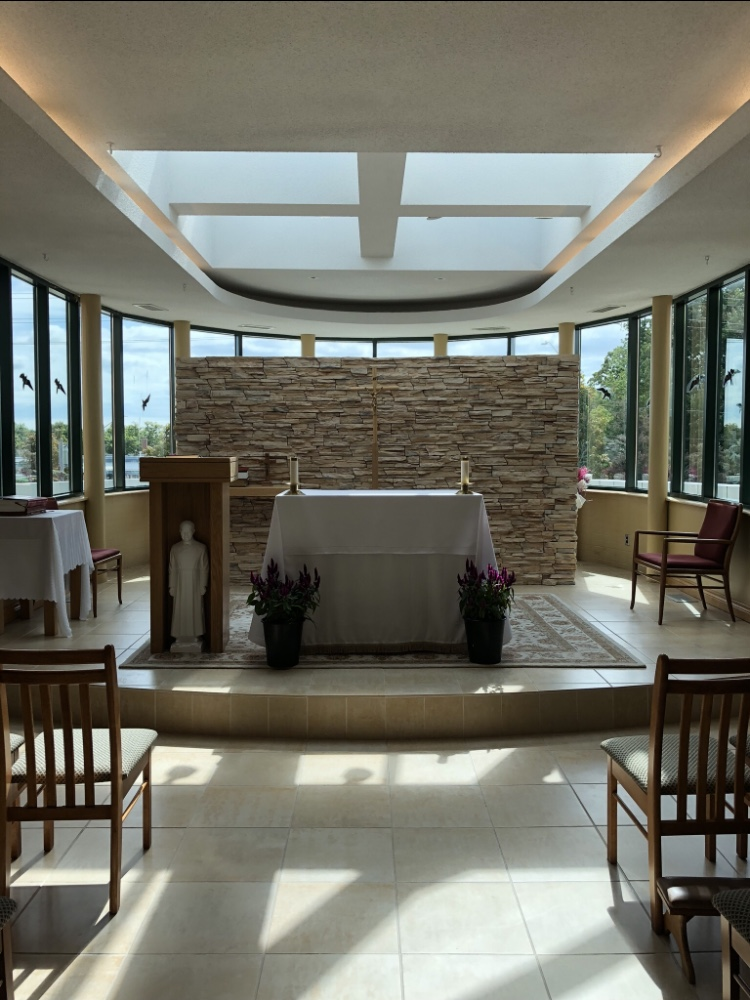
St. Joseph's Chapel, the school chapel of St. Brother Andre CHS in 2019, prior to the 2021 redecoration

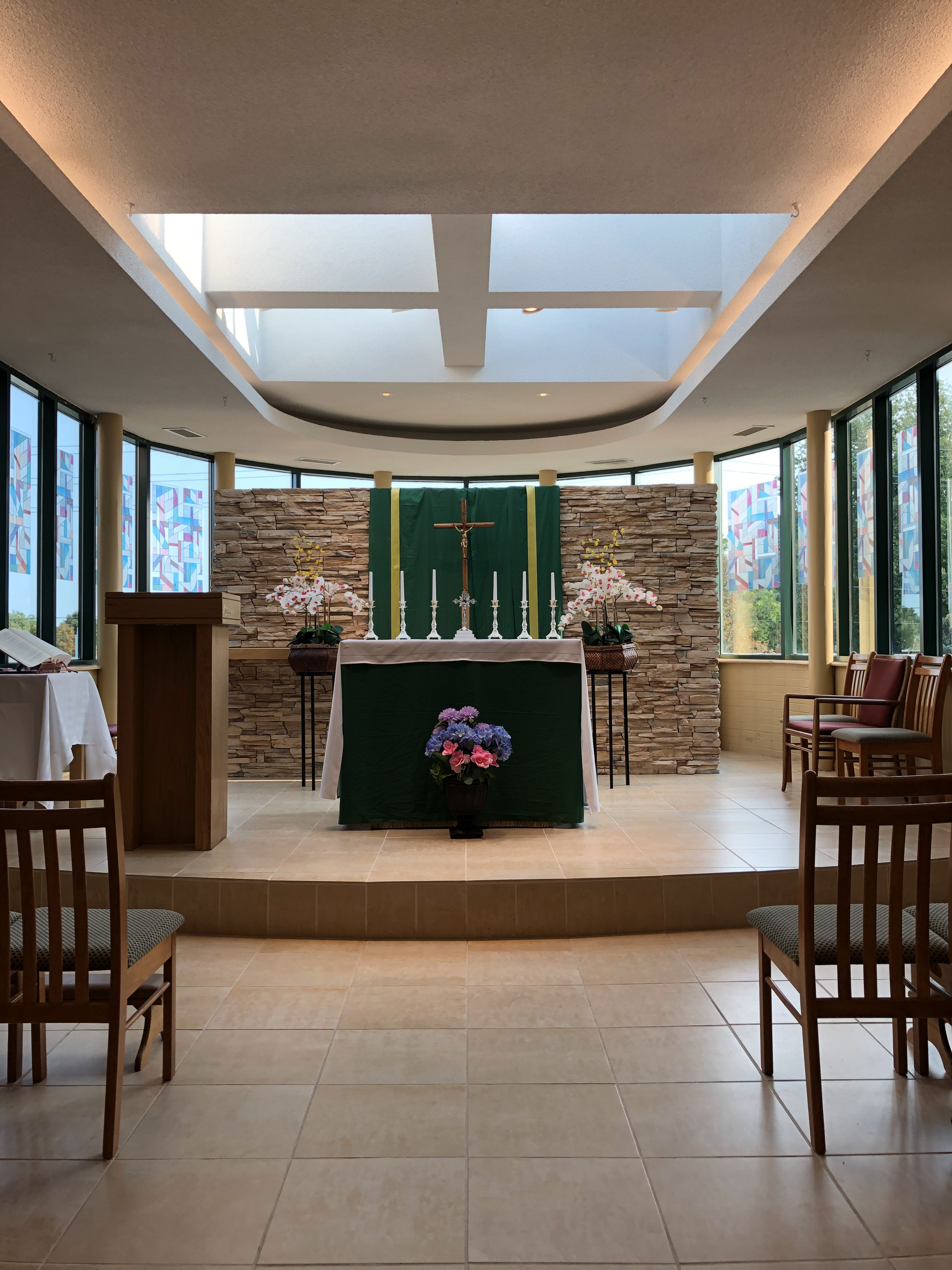
St. Joseph's Chapel after the 2021 redecoration

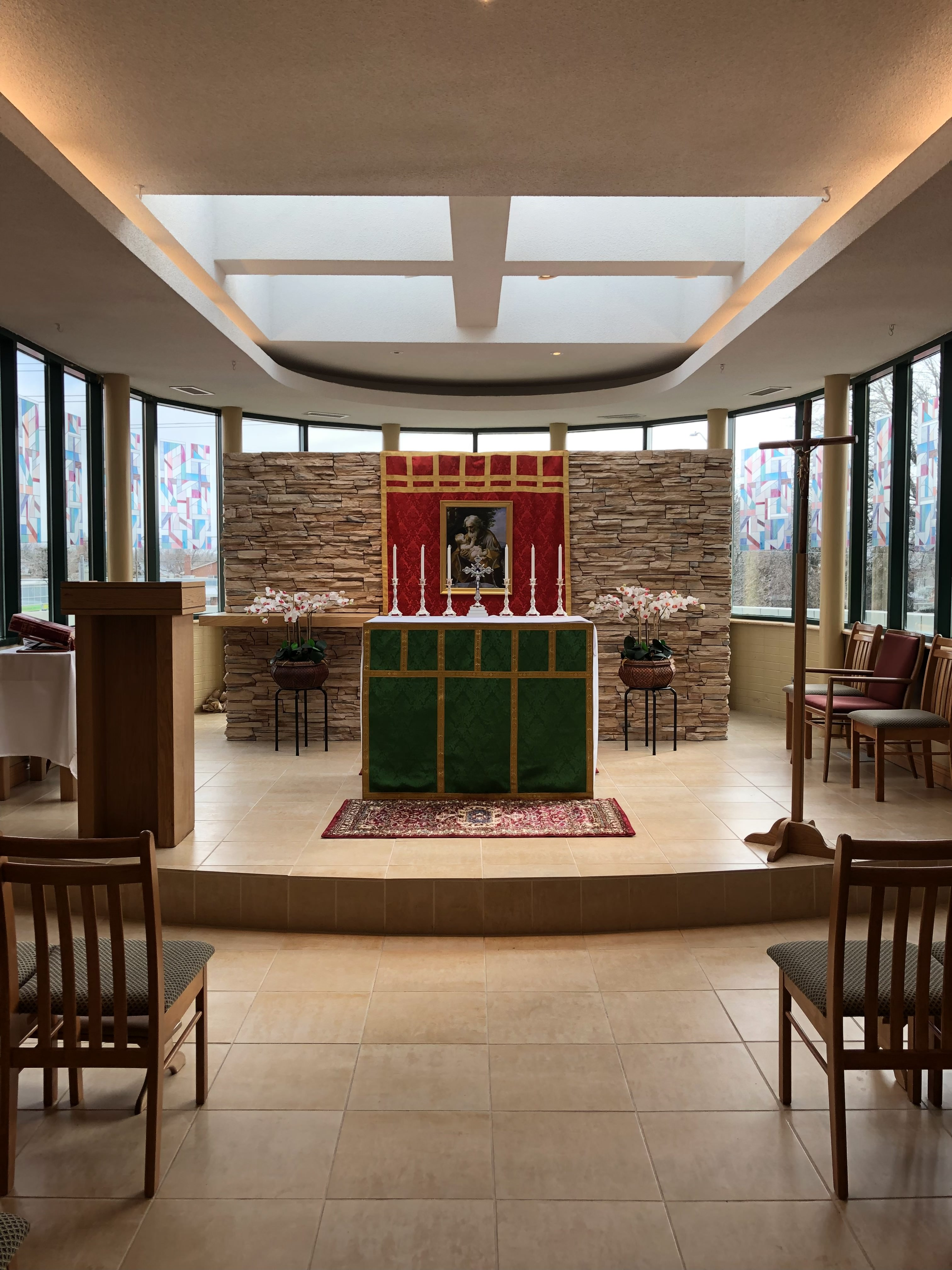
St. Joseph's Chapel after the 2023 redecoration.

== See also ==
- Education in Ontario
- List of secondary schools in Ontario
