= ScoreGolf =

Canadian golf media brand

SCOREGolf is a Canadian golf media brand, which began in 1980 as the program for the Canadian Open golf tournament. Its magazine is the largest circulated golf publication in Canada and one of the longest-running magazines in Canada.

== History ==
SCOREGolf launched in 1980. It was first published by Canadian Controlled Media Communications (CCMC), which was founded as the official publisher for the Toronto Blue Jays baseball club. The publication’s founders were Kim Locke and Charles Cipolla, with Locke serving as the publisher. The first editor was Lorne Rubenstein and the art director was Ron Bala.

Rubenstein (1981-1982) was succeeded as editor by Lisa Leighton (1983–86), John Gordon (1986-1991), Bob Weeks (1992-2012) and Jason Logan (2012-present). Gord French is SCOREGolf's art director. In 2000, the name changed from SCORE, Canada’s Golf Magazine to SCOREGolf. That reflected a growth in the company’s operations.

SCOREGolf has a long history of publishing compelling features and profiles as well as its much discussed biennial Top 100 Golf Courses in Canada ranking. In 2020, SCOREGolf celebrated its 40th anniversary with a special issue that included a ranking of the 40 most significant golf moments in Canadian golf over the previous 40 years. The list was compiled by four of the five editors in the magazine's history — Rubenstein, Gordon, Weeks and Logan — and was topped by Mike Weir winning the 2003 Masters.

In 2021, SCOREGolf was sold to retailer Golf Town and Torstar. The magazine continues to be published four times per year with daily content published on its website and social platforms.

== SCOREGolf Course Rankings ==
SCOREGolf is also known for its ranking of Canadian golf courses. The SCOREGolf Top 100 is compiled every two years and lists the best courses in Canada as selected by a panel of experts and regular golfers. The results are counted down on the website and presented in depth in the magazine.

In non-Top 100 years, SCOREGolf publishes the Top 59 Public Golf Courses in Canada. It ranks public Canadian courses based on merit and value.
