= St. Mary Catholic Secondary School (Pickering, Ontario) =

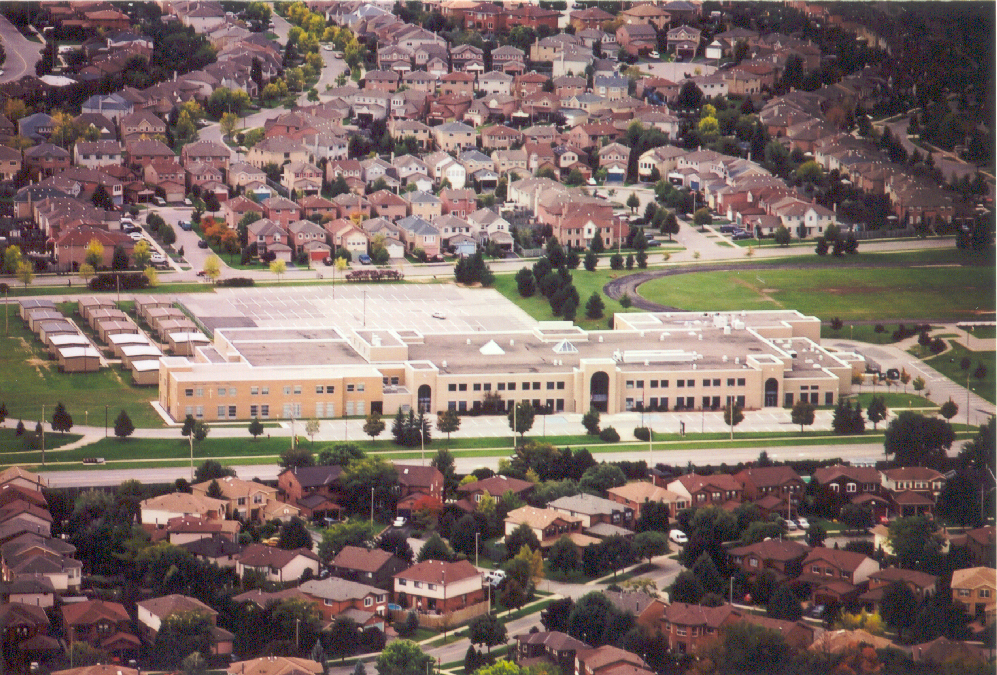

Location
- 1918 Whites Road; Pickering, Ontario, L1V 1R9; Canada; 43.83475°N 79.12337°W

Information
- School type: High school
- Principal: Mr. J. Di Vizio
- Chaplain: Ms. M. Bosetti
- Grades: 9-12
- Enrolment: 1,500 (2019/2020)
- Mascot: Leo The Lion/Monarchs
- Website: stmary.dcdsb.ca

St. Mary Catholic Secondary School is a Catholic secondary school located in Pickering, Ontario, Canada established in 1987. Operated by the Durham Catholic District School Board (DCDSB), it is the only Catholic high school located in Pickering.

== Feeder Schools ==
- Father Fenelon Catholic School
- St. Elizabeth Seaton Catholic School
- St. Isaac Jogues Catholic School
- St. Joseph Catholic School (Uxbridge)
- St. Josephine Bakhita (Ajax)
- St. Monica Catholic School

== Controversies ==
=== Non-Uniform Day Enforcement ===
On March 22, 2012, approximately 200 to 300 students were sent home due to wearing either shorts, khakis, capris and/or ankle socks, sparking outrage amongst students and parents. The administration at St. Mary claims the rule was in the student agenda, reminded the students about the rule the day before, and dismissed allegations of student suspensions.

=== 2019-2020 Yearbook ===
On October 10, 2020, St. Mary Catholic Secondary School had sent out its 2019-2020 yearbook to the graduates of that school year. It was then brought to light that a black man's quote was changed from him commemorating his grandma and thanking her for her support of his years of high school, to a racist message. This made the school issue a return on all yearbooks and announcing an investigation on the people who had changed his quote.

Days later, on October 16, 2020, nine more students came out saying that their quotes have been changed too. One criticized a female student's body image, another targeted a male student's grade. The nine people were a mix of male and female students from various cultural backgrounds.

== Notable alumni ==
- Andy Andreoff, NHL Player
- Drake Caggiula, NHL Player
- Yannick Carter, Canadian Football League Linebacker. Two time Grey Cup Champion (2007, 2014)
- Jennie Pappas, Actress and Dancer. Starred on Family Channels, The Next Step
- Andrea Lewis, Actress Degrassi: TNG
- Richard Karikari, CFL Player

== See also ==
- Education in Ontario
- List of secondary schools in Ontario
