= Holy Trinity Catholic Secondary School (Courtice) =

Coordinates: 43.9024°N 78.7778°W

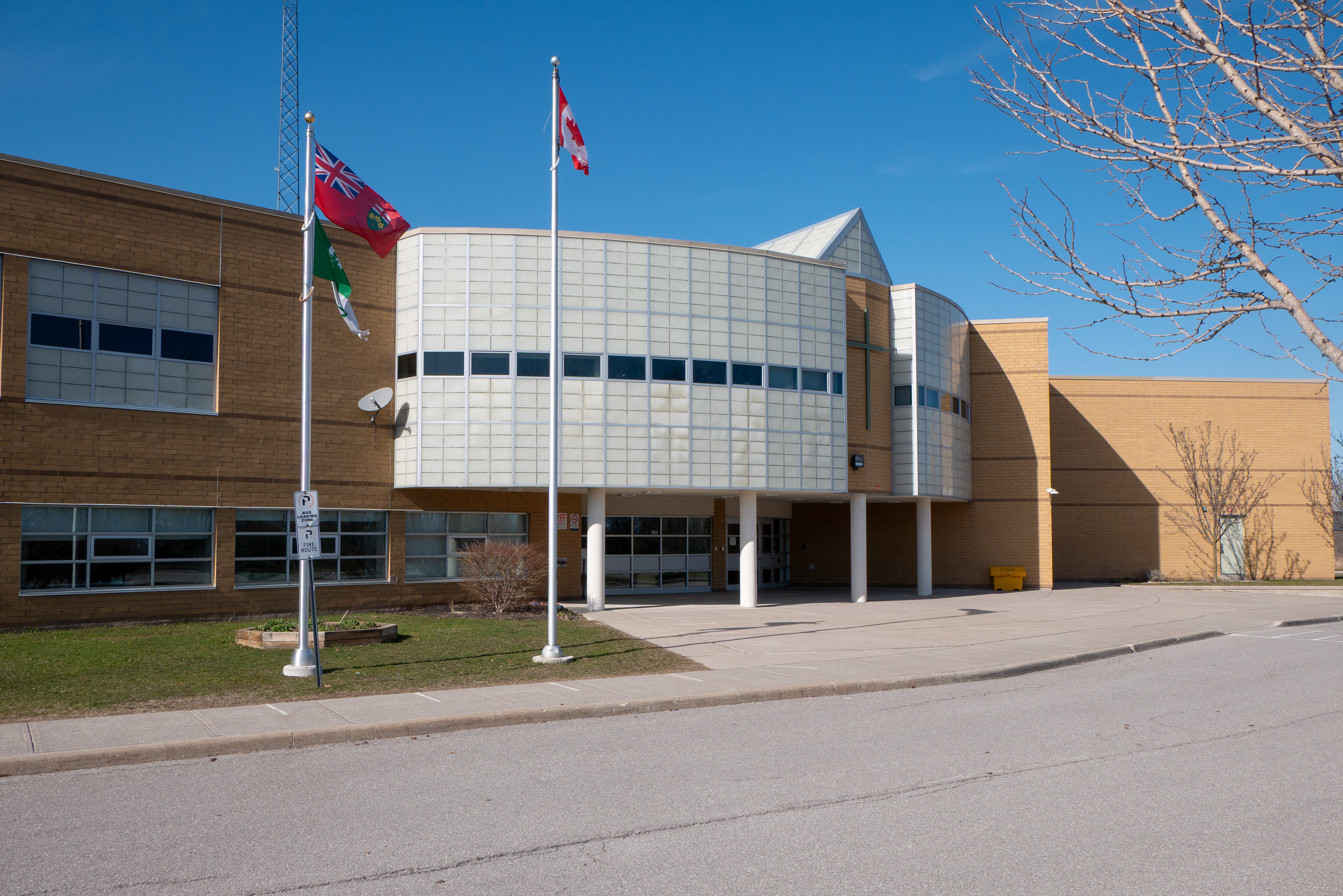
- Holy Trinity in 2025

Location
- 2260 Courtice Road, Courtice, ON L1E 2M8; Courtice, Ontario; Canada

Information
- School type: Publicly funded Catholic Secondary School
- Motto: "Create, Love, Act"
- Religious affiliation: Roman Catholic
- Founded: 2003
- School board: Peterborough Victoria Northumberland and Clarington Catholic District School Board
- Superintendent: Wayne Clark
- Area trustee: Kevin MacKenzie and Joshua Glover
- Principal: Daniela Conforti
- Grades: 9 to 12
- Enrollment: 590 (2019/2020)
- Language: English
- Area: Durham
- Colour
- Mascot: Turbo
- Team name: Titans
- Website: www.htcss.ca

Holy Trinity Catholic Secondary School is a publicly funded Roman Catholic secondary school in Courtice, Ontario, Canada.

The school was founded in 2003 and has been located at its current site since 2003.

== CASA ==
Holy Trinity is home to a Centre for Autism Spectrum Assistance program (CASA). The program works with autistic children and uses dedicated teachers, specially designed classrooms and a Snoezelen room. The program supports 12 students.

== Athletic programs ==
Holy Trinity has won several championships since opening in sports such as football, basketball, soccer, hockey, and have had students earn medals in wrestling. The Senior Girls' Basketball team has made two consecutive appearances in the provincial championships (2005, 2006). Senior Boys' (2005, 2009) and Senior Girls' (2007) Soccer teams have also made appearances in the provincial championships. The school is home to the 2007 'AA' LOSSA Junior Girls', Senior Girls' and Junior Boys' Soccer champions. The Boys Varsity Field lacrosse team has become somewhat of a powerhouse program, capturing 'AA' LOSSA gold in 2008, 2015, 2016, 2017, 2018, 2019, and 2022. In addition to the LOSSA golds, the Varsity Lacrosse team captured gold at OFSSA Field Lacrosse Festival in 2016, 2019, and 2022, along with Bronze in the 2017 edition of the event.

== See also ==
- Education in Ontario
- List of secondary schools in Ontario
