= Richview Collegiate Institute =

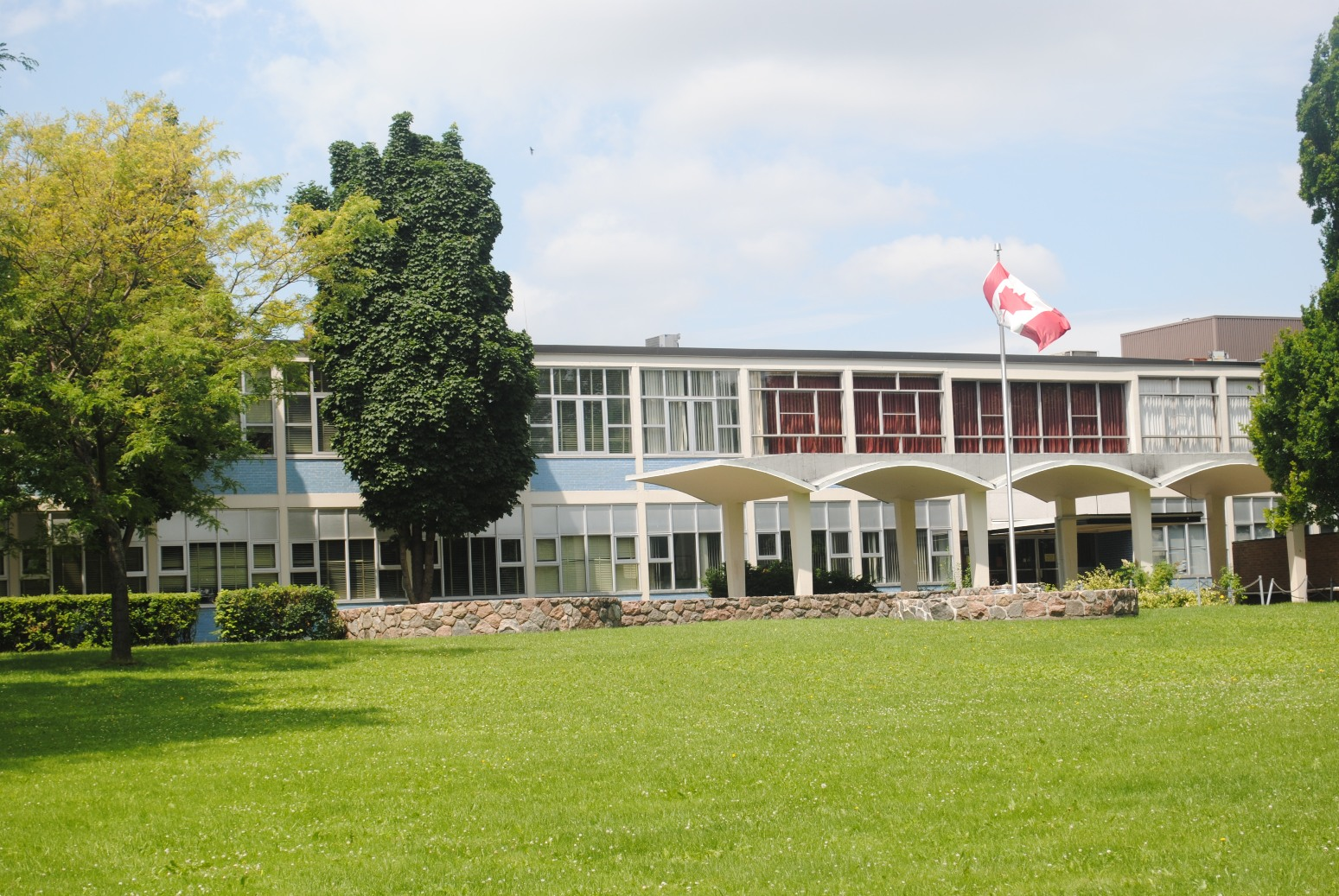

Location
- 1738 Islington Avenue; Richview, Etobicoke, Ontario, M9A 3N2; Canada; 43°40′43.39″N 79°32′23.87″W

Information
- School type: Public, high school
- Motto: Monumentum Aere Perennius (A monument more lasting than bronze)
- Religious affiliation: Secular
- Founded: 1958
- School board: Toronto District School Board (Etobicoke Board of Education)
- Superintendent: Beth Butcher; LC1, Executive; Lorraine Linton; LN02
- Area trustee: Dan McLean; Ward 2
- School number: 2808 / 938173
- Administrator: Helene Kingsley
- Principal: Lucie Kletke
- Grades: 9-12
- Enrolment: 1105 (2019-20)
- Language: English, French immersion or Extended French
- Campus: Urban
- Colours: Scarlet and Gold
- Team name: Richview Saints
- Rival: Etobicoke Rams
- Newspaper: Richview Voice
- Yearbook: The Rizmah
- Website: schoolweb.tdsb.on.ca/richview

Richview Collegiate Institute (Richview CI, RCI or Richview) is a secondary school in Etobicoke, in the west end of Toronto, Ontario, Canada under the jurisdiction of the Toronto District School Board. From its founding in 1958 until 1998, the school was part of the Etobicoke Board of Education.

Opened in 1958, RCI has earned its reputation as astrong academic institution containing a number of programs have been designed to better prepare students for the rigours of a post-secondary education and pathways. The motto is Monumentum Aere Perennius ("A monument more lasting than bronze"). This school is known for the attendance of Canada's 22nd Prime Minister Stephen Harper.

== History ==
The school was constructed in 1957 and opened in September 1958. It is an English and French Immersion Secondary School. As of 2026, enrollment at the school was 1125.

== Overview ==
=== Extracurricular activities ===
Richview's sports teams are known as the Saints and the school colours are Scarlet and Gold. School teams compete in archery, badminton, baseball, basketball, cheerleading, cross country, rugby, curling, golf, football, ice hockey, curling, skiing, soccer, swimming, tennis, track & field and volleyball.

Students may also participate in: Intermediate, or Senior Band, Stage Band, Junior Orchestra/Symphony, Senior Strings, Choir, Charity Week Activities, Fashion Show, Volleyball, Tennis, Swimming, Soccer, Cross Country, Track & Field, Athletic Council, Parent Council as well as various activities in the dramatic arts such as short plays, the SEARS Drama Festival Production and the Improv Team.

=== Student Newspaper ===
The Richview Voice was launched as an online newspaper in 2016. Former newspapers have been the Richview Herald launched in 2011, the Richview Epiphany launched in the 2008–2009 school year, and the R C Eye (a play on the school's initials, RCI), from the late 1960s.

== Notable alumni ==
- Gurdeep Ahluwalia, television broadcaster for CP24 and TSN SportsCentre
- Sam Bennett, NHL player for the Florida Panthers. Attended Richview from 2010 to 2012
- Brooke D'Orsay, actress
- Michael Ford, politician
- Gordon Giffin, thirty-fourth Ambassador of the United States to Canada
- Stephen Harper, 22nd Prime Minister of Canada. Attended Richview from 1973 to 1978
- Greg Hogeboom, ice hockey player, drafted to Los Angeles Kings
- Steve Mahoney, politician
- Scott Mellanby, retired NHL forward
- Drew Nelson, actor
- Lisa Ray, model and Bollywood actress
- Jane Siberry, singer-songwriter
- Nicole Stamp, host of TV's Reach For The Top
- Margo Timmins, lead singer of 1980s Canadian band Cowboy Junkies
- Joey Votto, MLB first baseman for the Cincinnati Reds, 2010 NL MVP. Attended Richview from 1997 to 2002
- Paul Watson, 1994 Pulitzer Prize-winning journalist
- Bob Weeks, TSN golf analyst, author and editor
- Katheryn Winnick, actress

== See also ==
- Education in Ontario
- List of secondary schools in Ontario
