= NTSS =

NTSS can refer to:

- NASA Technical Standards System
- National Talent Search Examination
- New Toronto Secondary School, a secondary school in Ontario, Canada
- New Town Secondary School, a secondary school in Dover, Singapore
- Northern Territory Space School
