= James S. Bell Junior Middle School =

James S. Bell Junior Middle Sports and Wellness Academy

Location
- 90 31 Street; Toronto, Ontario, M8W 3E9; Canada; 43°35′38″N 79°31′48″W

Information
- School type: Public, Elementary school
- Founded: 1914
- School board: Toronto District School Board
- Superintendent: Pamala Gough
- Area trustee: Bruce Davis
- School number: 282049
- Principal: Jennie Petko
- Grades: JK - 8
- Enrollment: 458 (September 2008)
- Language: English
- Area: Long Branch
- Colours: Black, Gold
- Mascot: Tiger
- Team name: James S. Bell Tigers
- History: S.S. No. 16 Etobicoke - 1913; Long Branch Public School 1916; Long Branch Public School and Continuation School - 1926
- Website: schools.tdsb.on.ca/jamessbell/

James S. Bell Junior Middle Sports and Wellness Academy is a public elementary school in Toronto, Ontario, Canada. James S. Bell is administered by the Toronto District School Board. The school serves the west end neighbourhood of Long Branch in the former suburb of the Etobicoke.

== History ==
The village of Long Branch did not have its own school until 1913. Children of the village had to travel along a cow's lane and over some railroad tracks to the Horner Avenue School. In 1913 a four grade classroom was opened in the old Baptist Church on 27th Street. This small school consisted of one room which was heated by a coal stove and had outdoor facilities. The teacher was Mr. John McGrath. This little classroom was known as S.S. No. 16 - Etobicoke.

In 1915 a four-room, two floor, school was built on the site which is now 3495 Lakeshore Blvd. West. This school became known as the Long Branch Public School. When the school opened there were only two classrooms on the main floor. The second floor had not yet been partitioned and was used as an auditorium. There were two playrooms in the basement, one for the boys and one for the girls. Children brought their lunches and had hot chocolate everyday which was prepared by one parent, Mrs. Ludow. She made this hot chocolate in the boiler room. The school had a large front lawn which was flooded in winter and used as a skating rink. In time, the second floor was partitioned to make two additional classrooms. The staff consists of Mr. McGrath, the principal, Miss Murchison, the teacher and Mr. Chavener, the caretaker. In 1920 six rooms were added to the rear of the building and in 1923 four rooms were added to the front of the building. By 1924 Long Branch Public School had grown in size to fourteen rooms.

In 1926 it became evident that Long Branch needed high school facilities. Another front section was added to the building to accommodate a continuation school. This new front section consisted of six classrooms, a board and staff room, a nurse's office and a principals office. The additions were completed in 1930-31 by George Roper Gouinlock, son of prominent architect George Wallace Gouinlock. These new facilities were used by the continuation school. Upon the completion of these additions, the school became known as The Long Branch Public and Continuation School. The principal was Mr. James. S. Bell who served the school from 1926 to 1946. In September 1946 Mr. Harvey H. Gibbs was appointed principal of the Public School and Mr. O. Barkley principal of the Continuation School. 1948-1951 were years of expansion for Long Branch Public and Continuation School. 1948 saw the introduction of kindergarten and 1949 the departments of Remedial Reading, Art, Home Economics and Industrial Arts. The Senior Boy's Academic Vocational class began in 1950. In 1951 the Continuation School moved to the New Toronto Vocational School (since 1983, Lakeshore Collegiate Institute) building and the Public School which had been housing classes in the basement rooms, gymnasium and three churches, filled the vacated space. Mr. Rod Jack became vice-principal. A secretary was added to the school staff.

Long Branch Public and Continuation School became the James S. Bell School in 1953 in honour of its late principal who had served it for 20 years. In 1954 six kindergarten and five grade one classes moved into a new and final wing of the school. In 1959 Parkview School was opened and Mr. Rod Jack left James S. Bell to be its principal. Mr. Elmer Yeandle became vice-principal of James S. Bell. In 1962 the Board awarded Mr. Harvey Gibbs a service certificate on completion of 25 years at James S. Bell (January 1, 1938 to December 31, 1962). Violin lessons were inaugurated under the direction of Mr. M. De Sotto in 1962 and in 1963 physical education was introduced under Mr. R. J. Lewis.

In 1964 the building of a new school was approved on Thirty First Street. From September to December 1964 the architect, Mr. A. G. Elton, developed plans for the new school inviting suggestions from staff into the planning of the classrooms. In February 1965 the Canadian Ensign was lowered for the last time and the new Maple Leaf flag raised by Mr. Gibbs, with all school personnel in attendance. April 1965 saw the Weller Construction company begin construction on the new school. In November 1965 the ceremony of laying the cornerstone took place with Board members, local dignitaries and all school personnel attending.

There was a student reunion and open house at the old school for former teaches and students in 1966. Approximately 1000 people attended. The funds raised from this event purchased "Bright May Reflections", an oil painting by Hilton Hassell O.S.A. which was presented to James S. Bell school.

By 1966 the new school was partially completed. Grades four to eight were moved into their new rooms on the second floor. The remaining classes, kindergarten to grade three, and the library moved into their respective rooms on October 11. The school office was ready in November and the Home Economics room in December. Approximately five hundred and fifty people attended the official opening of the school on the evening of November 25. Mrs. Bell, the widow of James S. Bell, and family gave the school $500.00 as a memorial to Mr. Bell. This money was used for library accoutrement.

In January 1967 the Lakeshore area, Mimico, New Toronto and Long Branch were amalgamated with Etobicoke as the Borough of Etobicoke. In June 1967 the staff gave Mr. Gibbs a retirement party which was attended by a great number of people who had been on the James S. Bell staff over the years. Mr. Gibbs was presented with a matching set of luggage. On June 29. 1967 Mr Gibbs retired after forty years of school service, twenty-one of them as the principal of James S. Bell. At the same time Mr. Yeandle, the vice principal, left to become principal of Parkview School and thirteen of the staff of thirty left teaching or transferred to other schools. In September 1967 Mr. Martin Caldwell became the principal of James S. Bell and Mr. Roger Parent became vice principal. In March 1969 Mr. Caldwell went on medical leave and Mr. Parent became the acting principal for the remainder of the school year. Mr. Paul McKenzie became the principal in September 1969.
