= Government Building (Toronto) =

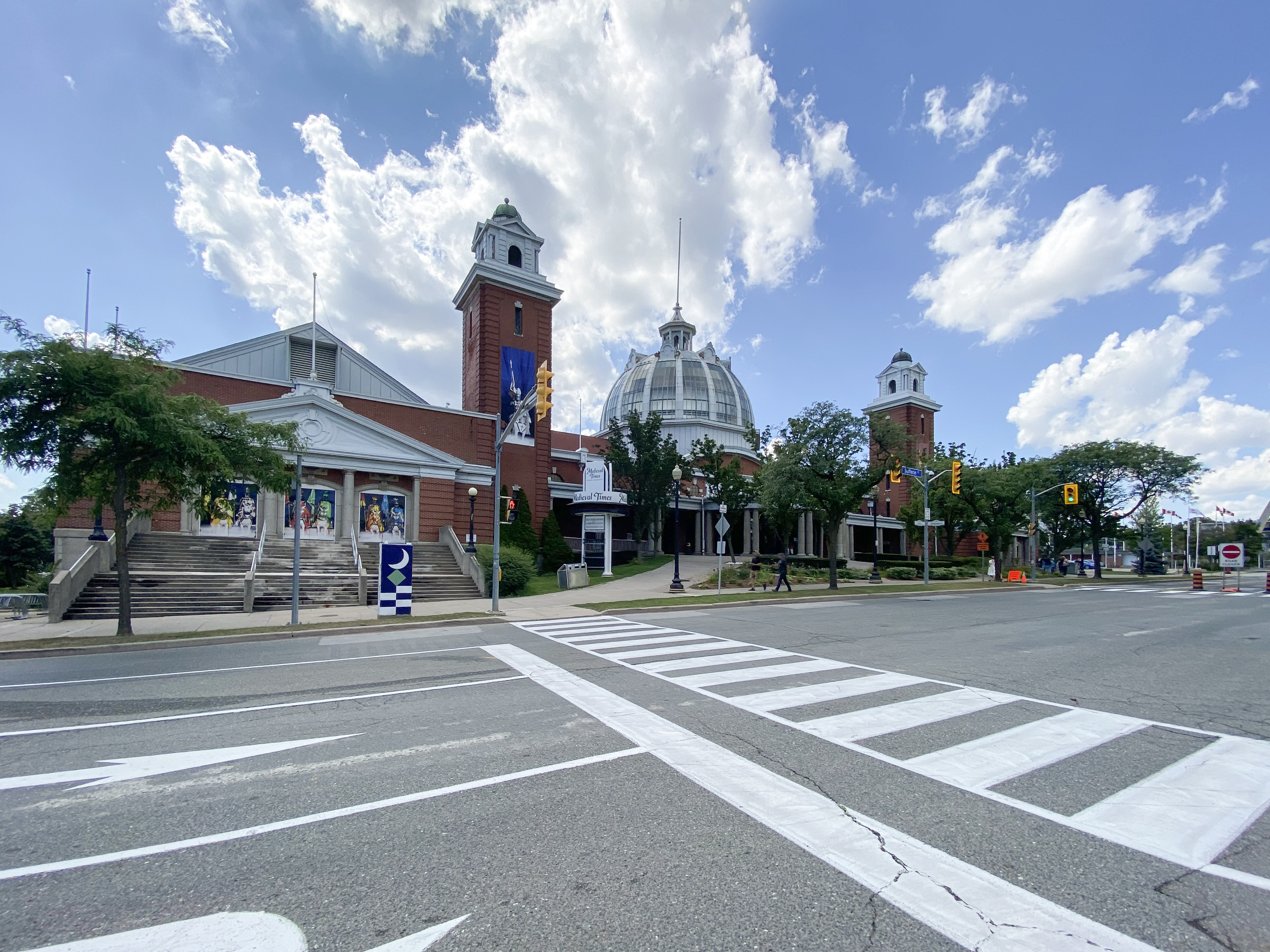
- Eastern facade in 2023
- Interactive map of the Government Building area
- Alternative names: Arts, Crafts and Hobbies Building

General information
- Type: Exhibition building
- Architectural style: Beaux-Arts
- Location: Exhibition Place, 10 Dufferin Street; Toronto, Ontario, Canada
- Current tenants: Medieval Times
- Opened: 1911
- Owner: City of Toronto

Technical details
- Structural system: Steel truss
- Floor count: 1

Design and construction
- Architect: George W. Gouinlock

Website
- medievaltimes.com/toronto

The Government Building, also known as the Arts, Crafts and Hobbies Building, is a heritage exhibition building at Exhibition Place in Toronto, Ontario, Canada. Built in 1911 for the annual Canadian National Exhibition (CNE), the building has been used since 1993 as the Toronto location of the Medieval Times chain of dinner theatres.

== Description ==
The building is a one-storey building with an "E" floorplan. At the intersection is a large dome. The architectural style is Beaux-Arts, designed by George W. Gouinlock.

== History ==
The building was initially used for government displays at the CNE. The building became the host of the "Arts, Crafts & Hobbies" exhibit at the CNE. It was generally not used during the rest of the year, except for storage. During World War I, the building was used as barracks for Canadian soldiers. In 1959, the Government Building was used for town hall meetings on the planned Bloor-Danforth Toronto Transit Commission subway project.

In the 1990s, Metro Toronto sought to increase revenues from Exhibition Place during a time of government downloading. Medieval Times, a theatre company putting on recreations of medieval jousting, won a contract to operate the building. A support building and stable was constructed at the rear of the building.

== Gallery ==
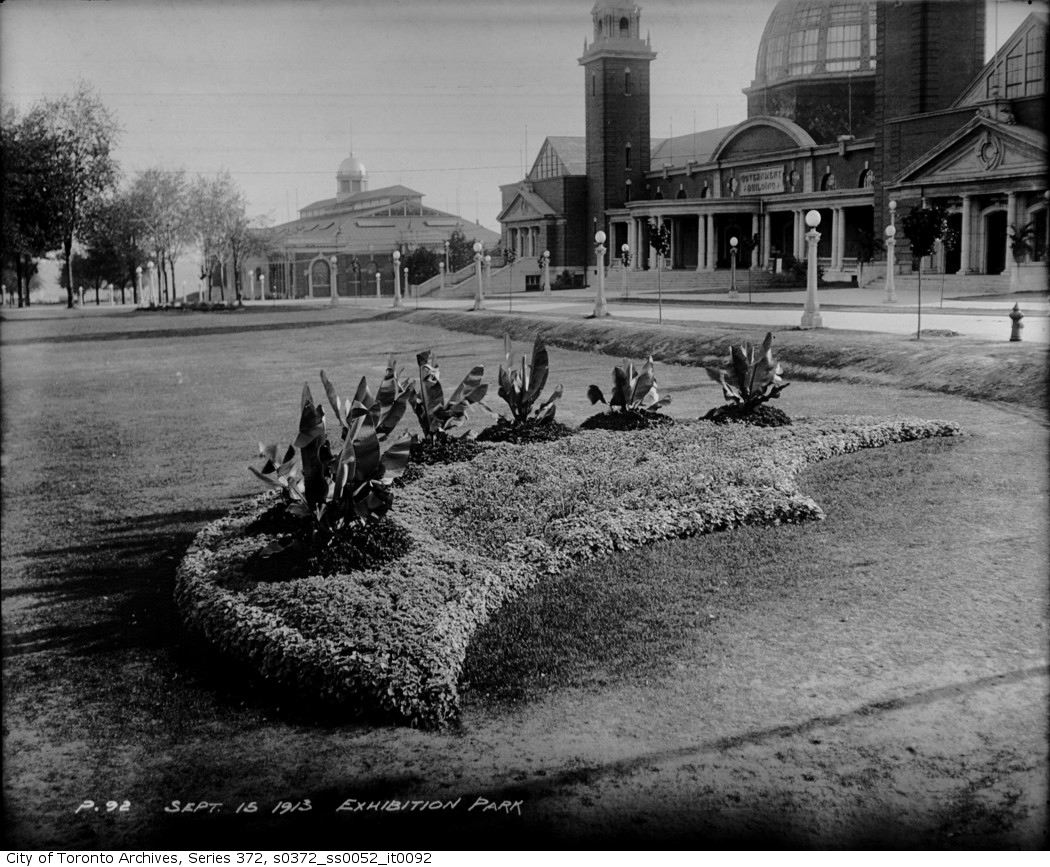
View of the Government Building in September 1913

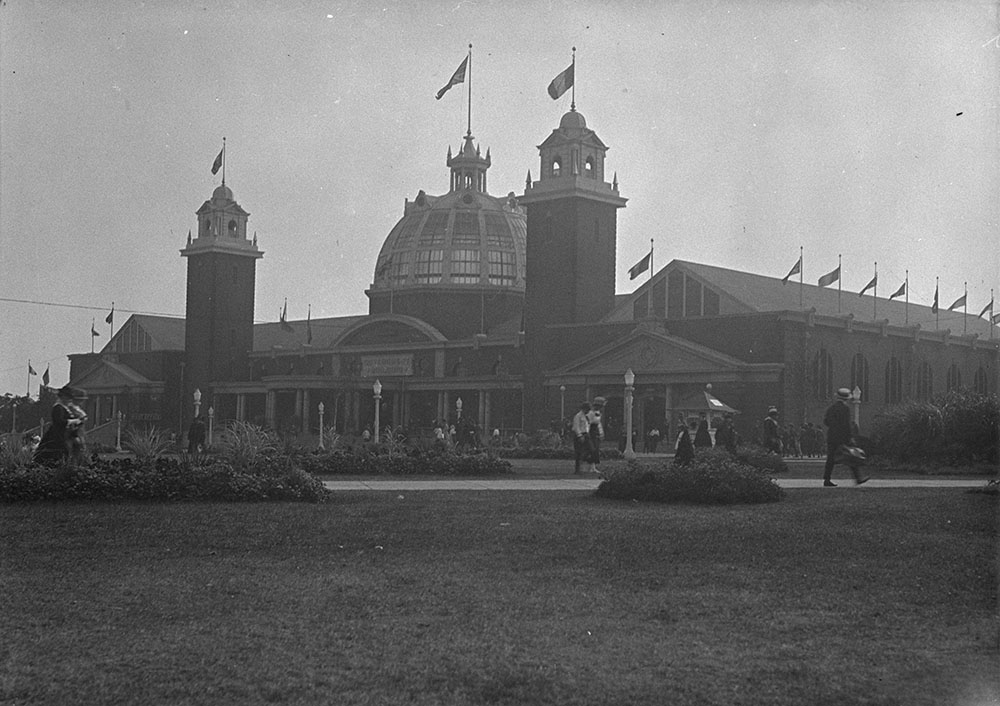
Eastern facade of the building, 1920 CNE

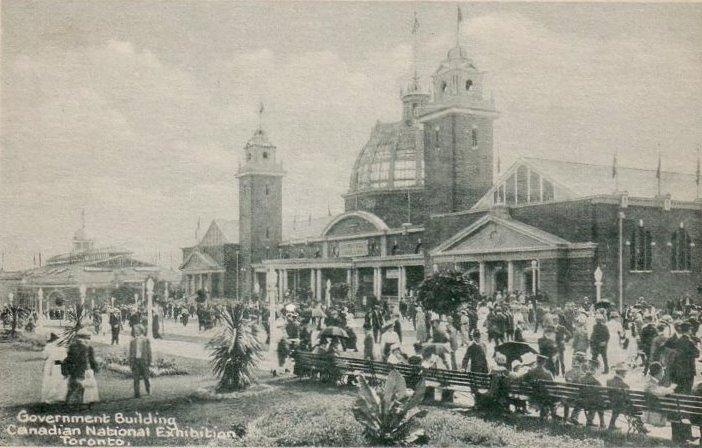
Postcard of the building, 1927 CNE

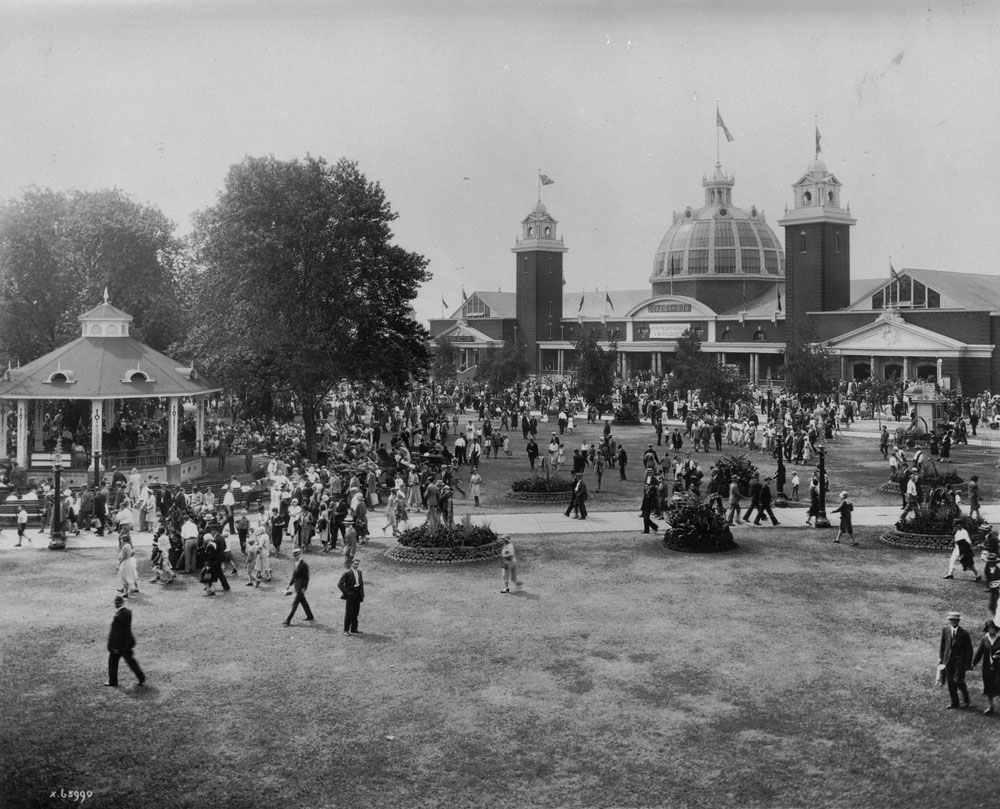
View of the building and exhibition grounds, 1930 CNE
