= Lakeshore Collegiate Institute =

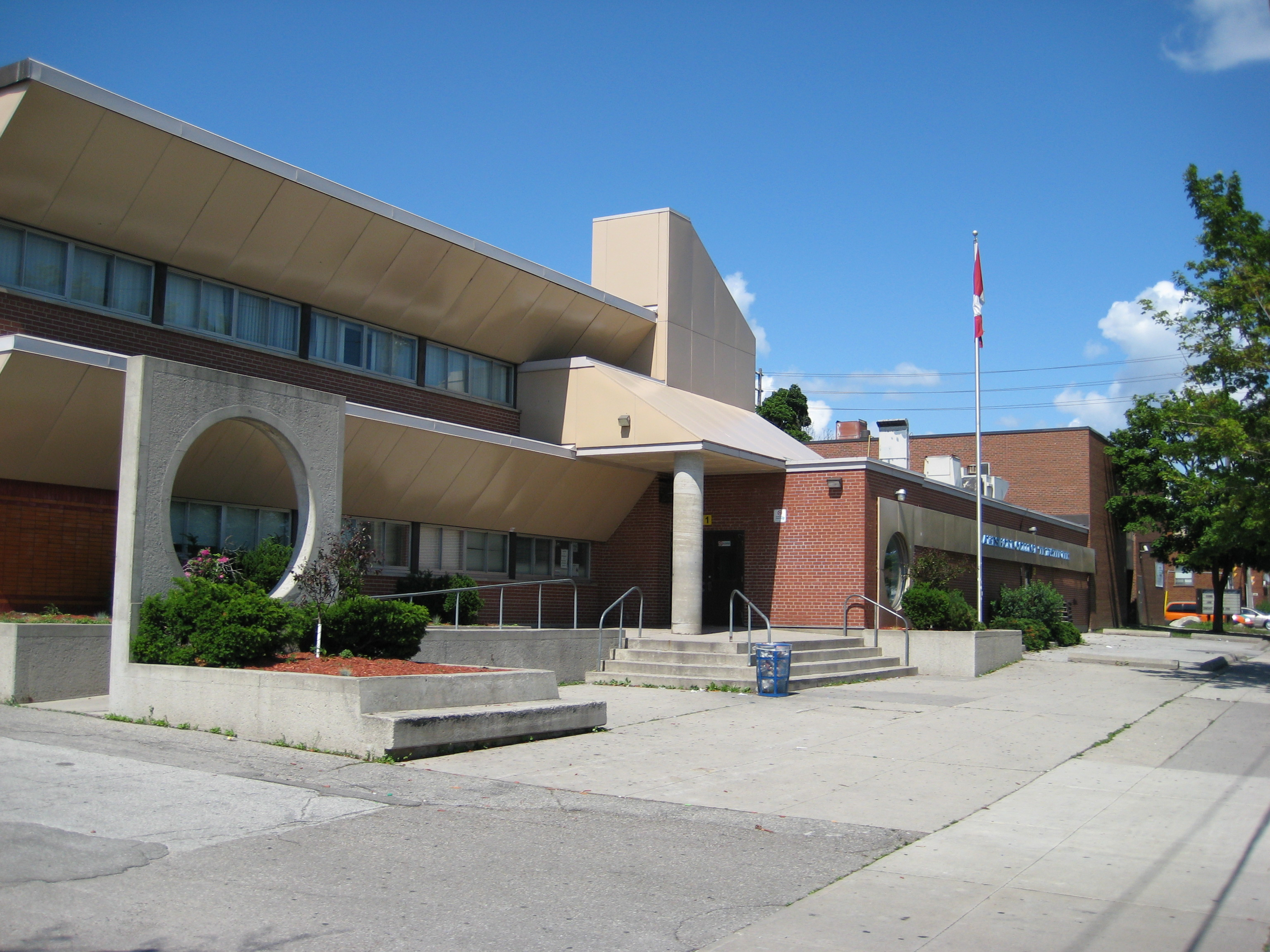

Location
- 350 Kipling Avenue; Toronto, Ontario, M8V 3L1; Canada; 43.601466°N 79.519231°W

Information
- Former name: New Toronto Secondary School (1951-1983); Alderwood Collegiate Institute (1955-1983)
- School type: Public High School
- Motto: Futurum Doctrina et Concordia Prospice (Look to the Future with Knowledge and Friendship)
- Religious affiliation: Secular
- Founded: 1983
- School board: Toronto District School Board
- Superintendent: Harpreet Ghuman
- Area trustee: Patrick Nunziata; Ward 3
- School number: 2817 / 921092
- Principal: Gillian Elango
- Grades: 9-12
- Enrolment: 801 (2012-13)
- Language: English
- Schedule type: Semestered
- Area: Etobicoke
- Colours: Blue, White and Silver
- Mascot: Phoenix
- Team name: Lakeshore Phoenix
- Website: schoolweb.tdsb.on.ca/lakeshoreci/
- Last updated: April 14, 2025

Lakeshore Collegiate Institute (also referred to as LCI or Lakeshore) is a high school in Toronto, Ontario, Canada. Built in 1951, Lakeshore Collegiate is a merger of New Toronto Secondary School and Alderwood Collegiate Institute. It is situated on the northwest corner of Kipling Avenue and Birmingham Street in Ward 3 of the Toronto District School Board. It serves the New Toronto, Long Branch, Alderwood, and Mimico neighbourhoods.

== History ==
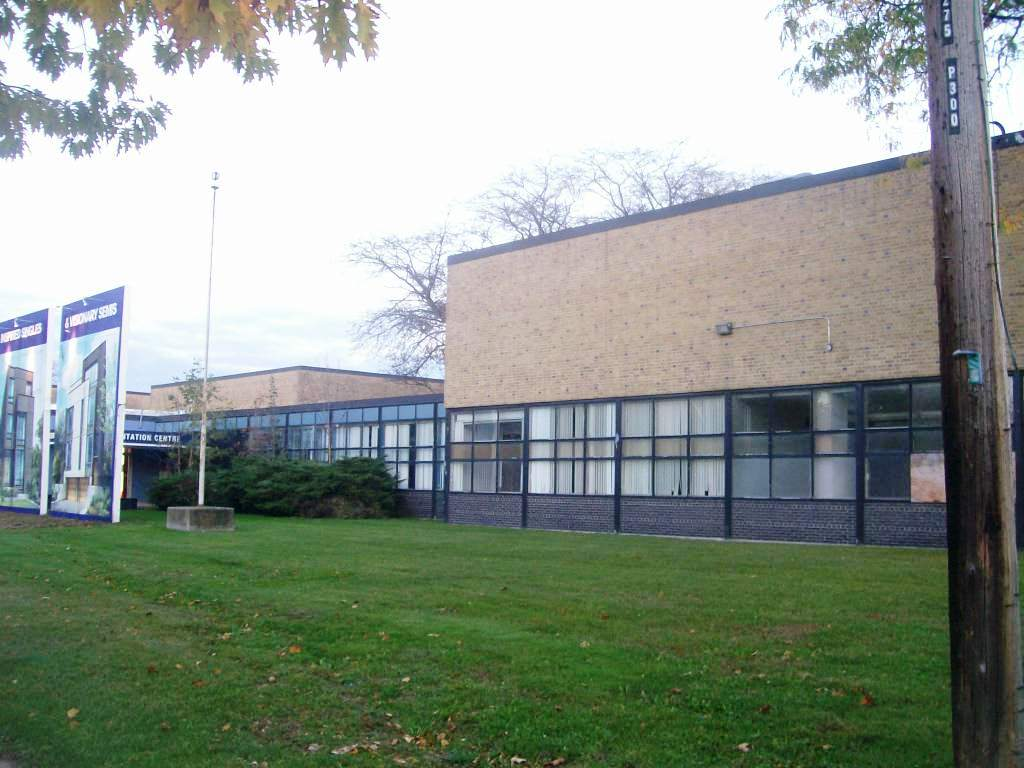
Alderwood Collegiate Institute, shown here prior to demolition, merged into New Toronto to form Lakeshore.

New Toronto Secondary School was originally established on September 4, 1951 by the New Toronto Board of Education to serve the town of New Toronto and emphasized the technical trades, sciences, and mathematics, to support the many industries in the town at the time. The school's roots go back to 1926 when Long Branch Continuation School was established as an extension of an elementary school with six classrooms. The vocational program began in 1950 and students moved to the new high school the following year.

Another school in the area, Alderwood Collegiate Institute was also opened on September 6, 1955, with the official opening ceremony November 1955 as an academic high school.

During the 1980s, enrollment at Etobicoke public schools plummeted as many catholic transferred their children to the Catholic school system when full funding commenced. This led to the closure of many schools including Alderwood Collegiate Institute, Royal York Collegiate Institute and Mimico High School. The students of those schools were consolidated with the students of New Toronto into the newly named Lakeshore Collegiate Institute which opened on September 6, 1983.

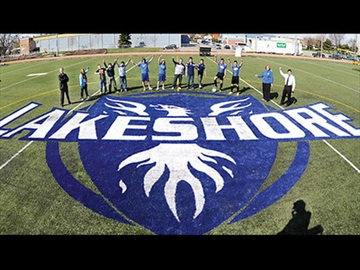
Lakeshore's new field

== See also ==
- Education in Ontario
- List of secondary schools in Ontario
