= Horticulture Building (Toronto) =

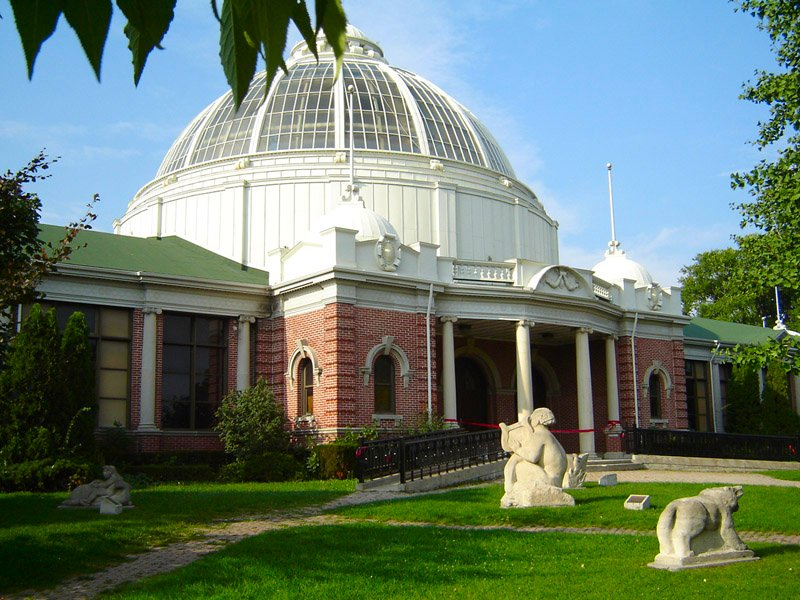
- Horticulture Building in 2005

General information
- Type: Exhibition building Special event space
- Architectural style: Beaux-Arts
- Location: Exhibition Place, 15 Saskatchewan Road, Toronto, Ontario, Canada
- Coordinates: 43.6325°N 79.4236°W
- Opened: 1907
- Owner: City of Toronto

Technical details
- Structural system: Steel truss
- Floor count: 1
- Floor area: 32,000 square feet (3,000 m^{2})

Design and construction
- Architect: George W. Gouinlock

Website
- torontoeventcentre.com

The Horticulture Building, which houses the Toronto Event Centre, is a heritage building at Exhibition Place in Toronto, Ontario, Canada, containing event and conference space. It was built in 1907 for the display of horticulture during the annual Canadian National Exhibition (CNE), and it is a listed heritage building.

Along with four other buildings at Exhibition Place designed by the same architect, George W. Gouinlock, it is a National Historic Site of Canada. In 2004, the building was leased to a private company for 20 years to use as a nightclub and for special events.

== Description ==
The Horticulture Building was constructed in 1907 and was designed by local architect G. W. Gouinlock in the Beaux-Arts style. It is a one-storey building, in the layout of an "E", with a large glass dome at the intersection of the wings. The glass dome is the site of the main entrance facing south. The wings extend to the east and west to the north.

== History ==
The site was previously the location of Toronto's Crystal Palace building, an exhibition hall fashioned after the design of the Crystal Palace in London, England. Toronto's Crystal Palace was destroyed by fire on October 18, 1906, spread by sparks from a fire in the grandstand building. The following year, the Horticulture Building was constructed.

Between 1942 and 1946, when the CNE grounds were in use by the Canadian armed forces, the Horticulture Building became the Quartermaster Stores. In September 1949, when the S.S. Noronic passenger liner was destroyed by fire in Toronto Harbour, the Horticulture Building was turned into an emergency morgue. It temporarily housed as many as 104 casualties.

In 1958, the building was used in the design competition for Toronto's City Hall. All of the models for the new city hall and square were put on display for public inspection.

In 2004, Muzik Clubs Inc. won a competitive process to occupy the building and grounds from 2004 until 2024. It operated the upscale Muzik nightclub on Saturday nights and used the building for other private events. In 2013 the club proposed building swimming pools on the site in exchange for an extension of the lease until 2034. That proposal was turned down. Muzik Clubs Inc. is now known as Toronto Event Centre, and its focus is more on corporate events.

== Gallery ==
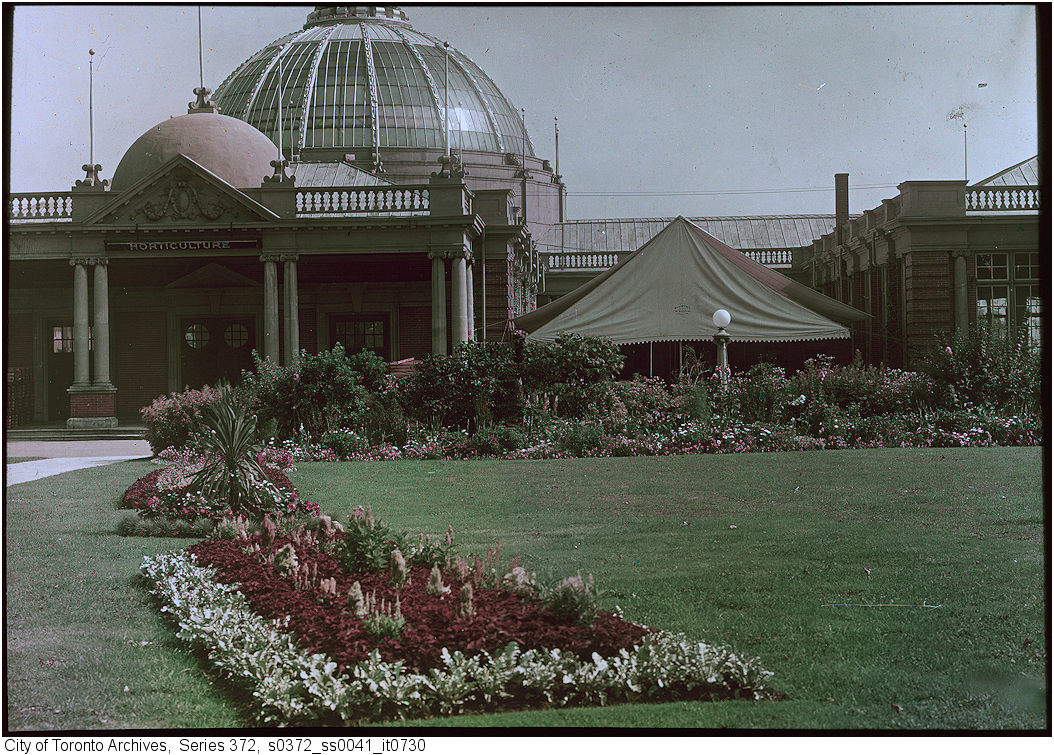
View of the building in 1912

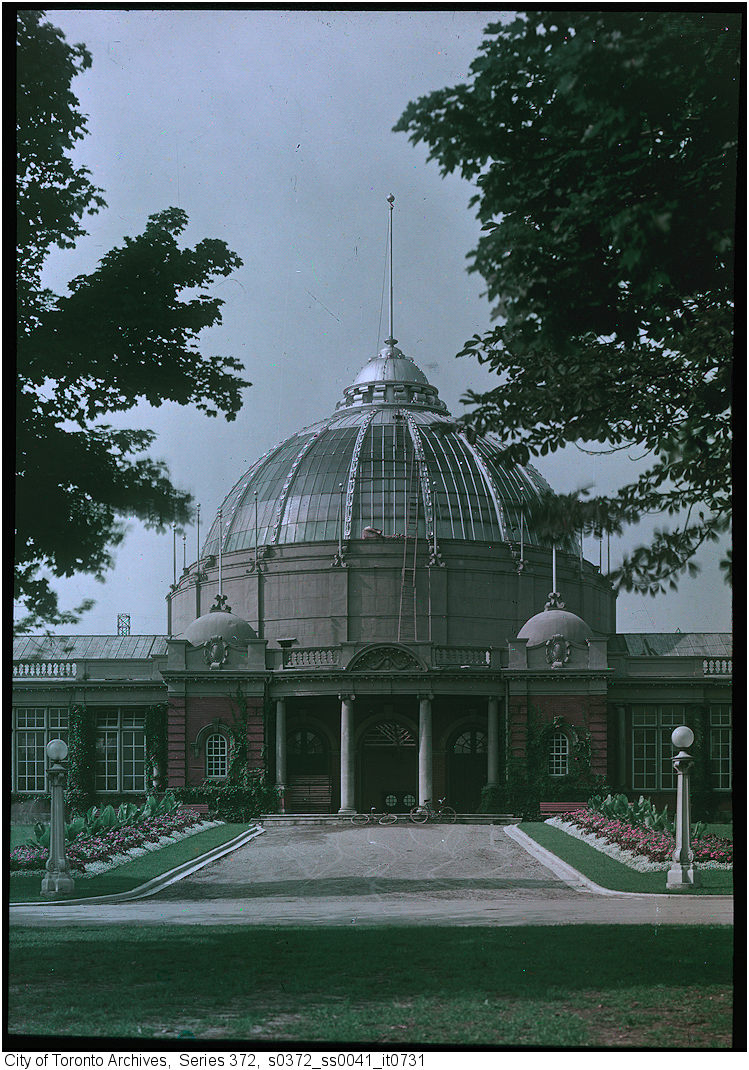
Main entrance in 1912

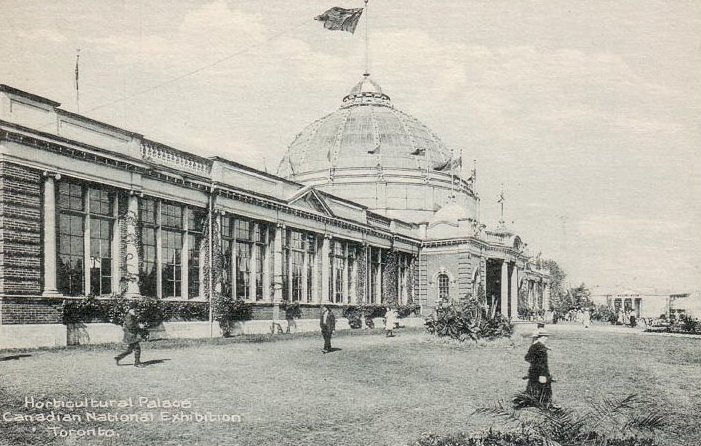
The building in 1927
