= New Toronto Secondary School =

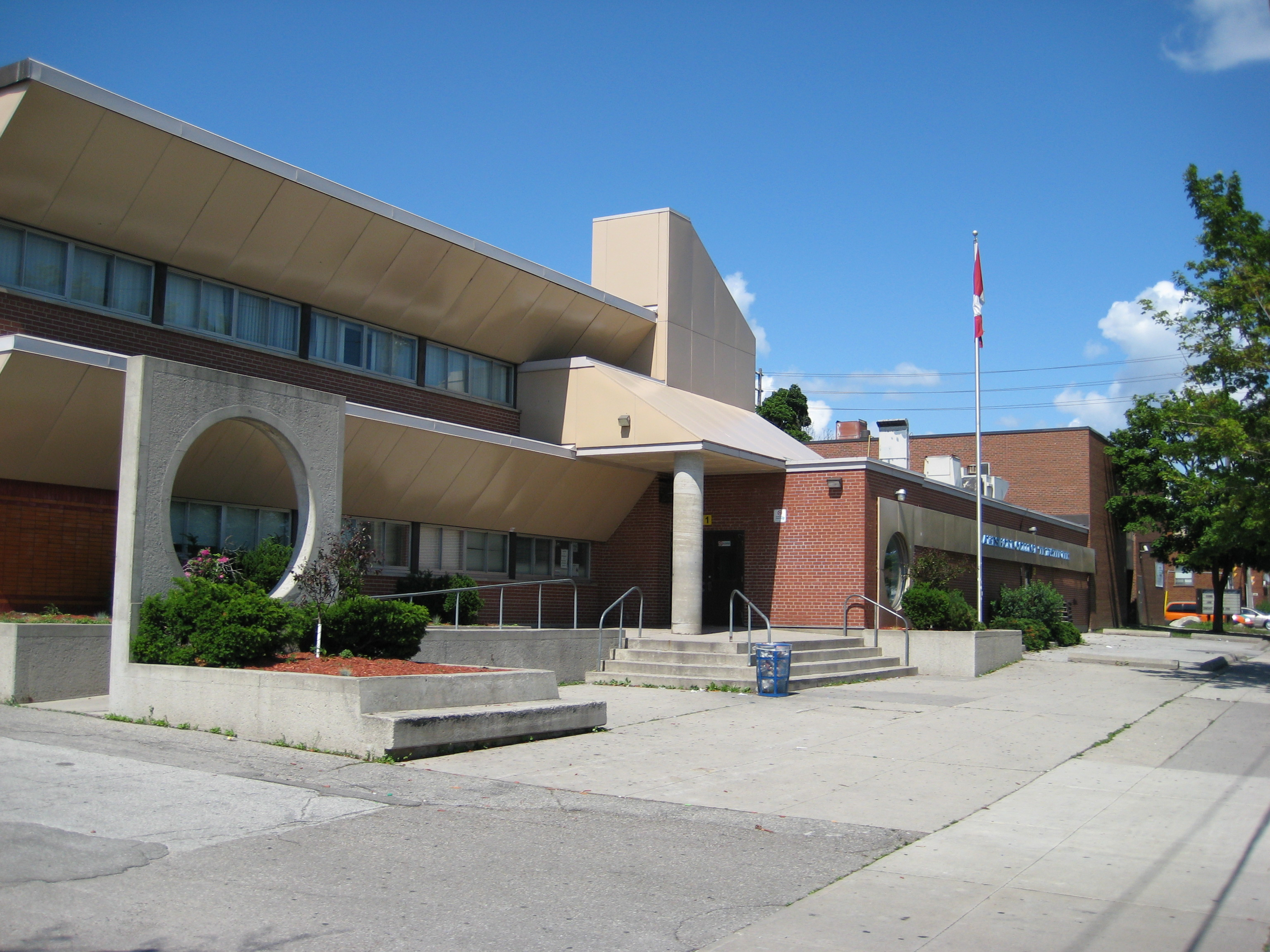

Location
- 350 Kipling Avenue; Toronto, Ontario, M8V 3L1; Canada; 43.601466°N 79.519231°W

Information
- Former name: Long Branch Continuation School (1926-1951); New Toronto Vocational School
- School type: Public High School
- Motto: Respice Ad Finem (Keep Looking to the End)
- Religious affiliation: Secular
- Founded: 1926
- Status: see Lakeshore Collegiate Institute
- Closed: 1983
- School board: Toronto District School Board (Etobicoke Board of Education)
- Superintendent: Sandra Tondat; LN19
- Area trustee: Patrick Nunziata; Ward 3
- School number: 2817 / 928550
- Grades: 9-13
- Language: English
- Area: Etobicoke
- Colours: Green, Maroon and White
- Team name: New Toronto Trojans

New Toronto Secondary School (New Toronto S.S., NTSS or New Toronto), formerly known as Long Branch Continuation School and New Toronto Vocational School is a former public high school in Toronto, Ontario, Canada. It existed from 1926 until 1983 in the old town of New Toronto and later the suburb of Etobicoke. This school was operated by the New Toronto Board of Education, which was then merged into the Etobicoke Board of Education and the Toronto District School Board.

It was one of the first vocational schools to serve the southern area in the former City of Etobicoke. The motto of this school was "Respice Ad Finem" which translated from Latin into Keep Looking to the End.

== History ==
Origins of the school began when the Long Branch Continuation School was established in 1926 as an extension of Long Branch Public School. The front section of the elementary school was added to the building to accommodate a continuation school. This new front section consisted of six classrooms, a board and staff room, a nurse's office and a principals office. The additions were completed in 1930-31 by George Roper Gouinlock, son of prominent architect George Wallace Gouinlock. These new facilities were used by the continuation school.

The principal of the Continuation School was James. S. Bell who served the school from 1926 to 1946. In September 1946, O. Barkley principal of the Continuation School. 1948-1951 were years of expansion for Long Branch Public and Continuation School. The Senior Boys Academic Vocational class began in the fall of 1950.

Following World War II, the New Toronto Board of Education (the forerunner to the Etobicoke Board of Education and the Toronto District School Board) proceeded with discussions to build such a school within The Lakeshore Area. The Long Branch Continuation School, which was providing high school education for New Toronto and Long Branch, was struggling to keep up with capacity pressures. Mimico High School, which was business-oriented, was the only other high school operating in The Lakeshore area at the time.

For some time it was debated just what form this school should take and finally it was decided to build a combination High and Technical School on Eighteenth Street (now known today as Kipling Avenue) to be known as New Toronto Vocational School. The building was erected in 1950 and is being opened for classes on September 4, 1951 with the school officially opened on December 7, 1951 by the New Toronto Board of Education. The new building was designed by architect John B. Parkin.

The Public School which had been housing classes in the basement rooms, gymnasium and three churches, filled the vacated space. A secretary was added to the school staff. In 1953, Long Branch became James S. Bell Public School.

Due to the "Baby Boom" of the post-WWII era, additional capacity was required in the Lakeshore high school system. As a result, by 1965, the size of New Toronto Secondary School was almost doubled with additions being erected to meet the needs.

Following the extension of public funding to Ontario separate schools in the early 1980s, by the Ontario Government of Bill Davis, transfer of funding and students to Roman Catholic separate schools caused a crisis in public school system. The loss of students required the closure of some public schools. New Toronto Secondary School was originally slated to be closed, however, community action and the facts that the school was centrally located in The Lakeshore and it was the only school with technical shops to teach skilled trades ultimately determined that it would remain as the area's public high school.

In June 1983, Alderwood Collegiate Institute in Alderwood closed its doors. New Toronto and Alderwood were merged to form Lakeshore Collegiate Institute. In 1988, Mimico High School closed and all public secondary school students in the Lakeshore area would attend LCI from that time.

== Notable alumni ==
- William Bell, Canadian author
- Kirk LaPointe, journalist and politician

== See also ==
- List of high schools in Ontario
