= Broadview Hotel (Toronto) =

Canadian hotel

Coordinates: 43.658993°N 79.350075°W

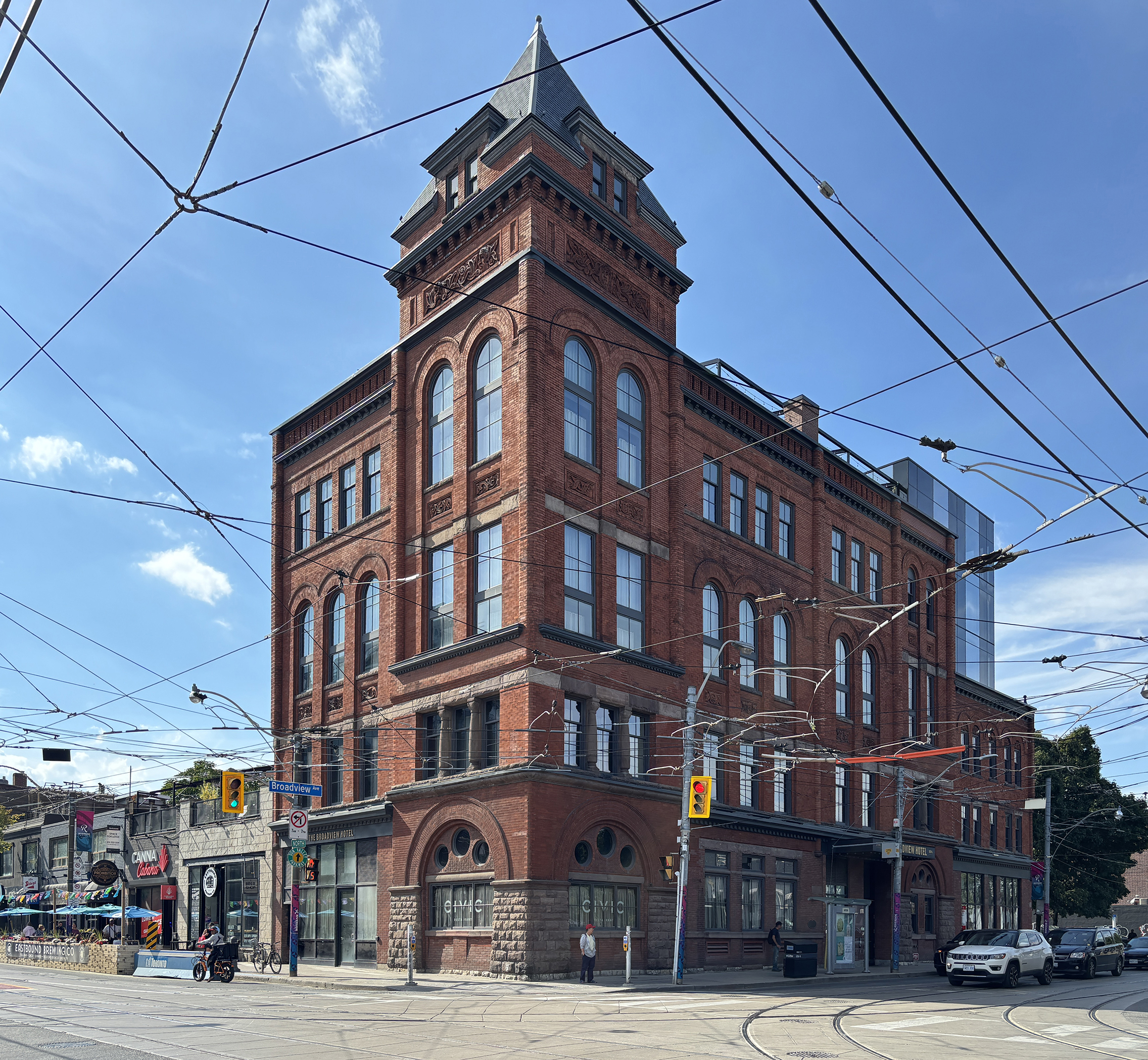
- View of Broadview Hotel in 2025 from south-east
- Former names: Dingman's Hall; Broadview Hotel; Lincoln Hotel; New Broadview House Hotel

General information
- Type: Hotel
- Location: 106 Broadview Avenue, Toronto, Ontario, Canada
- Completed: 1893
- Renovated: 1907; 2017
- Owner: Streetcar Developments / Dream Unlimited

Design and construction
- Architects: Robert Ogilvie (1893); George Wallace Gouinlock (1907); ERA Architects (2017)

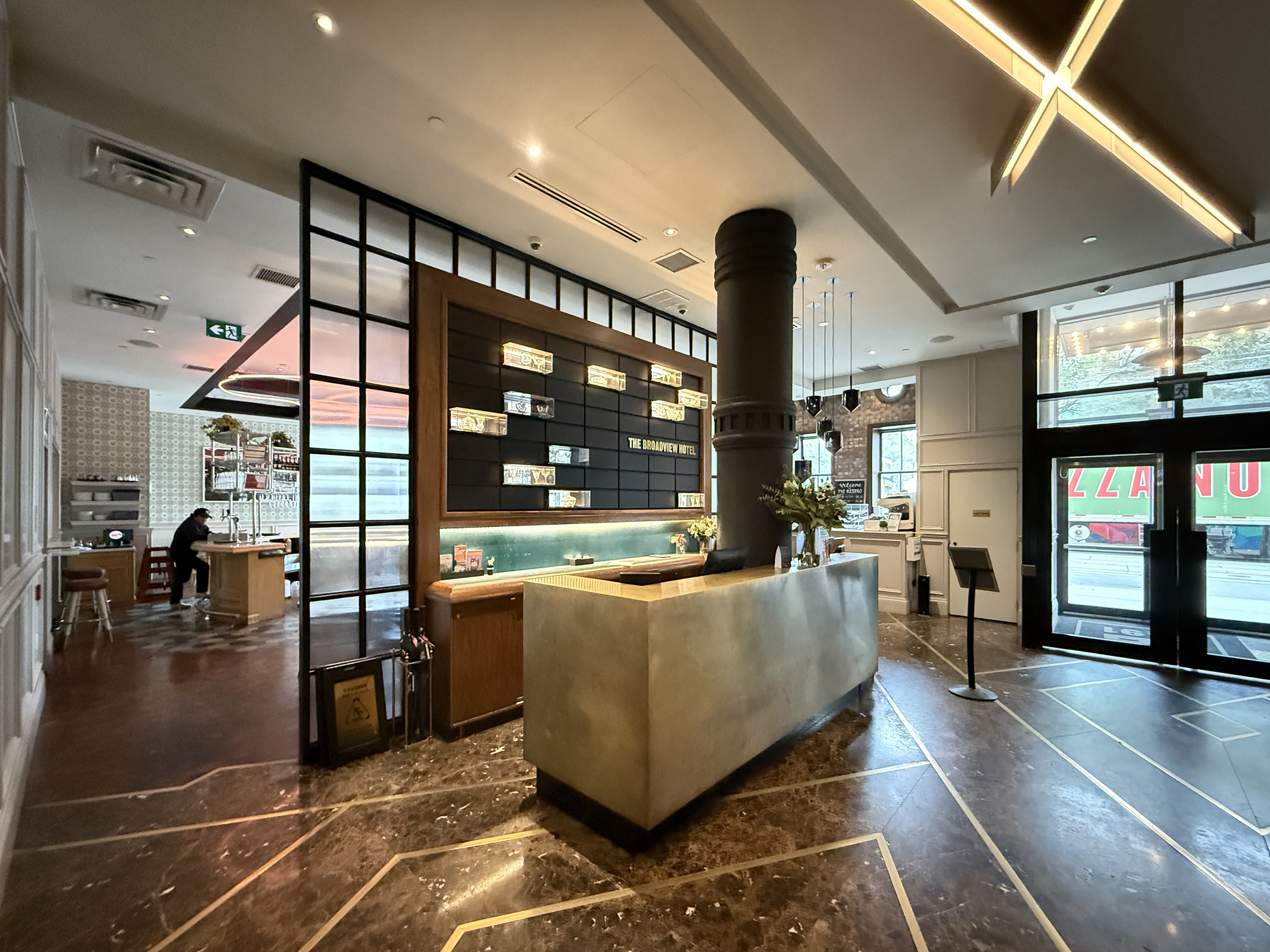
Hotel Lobby

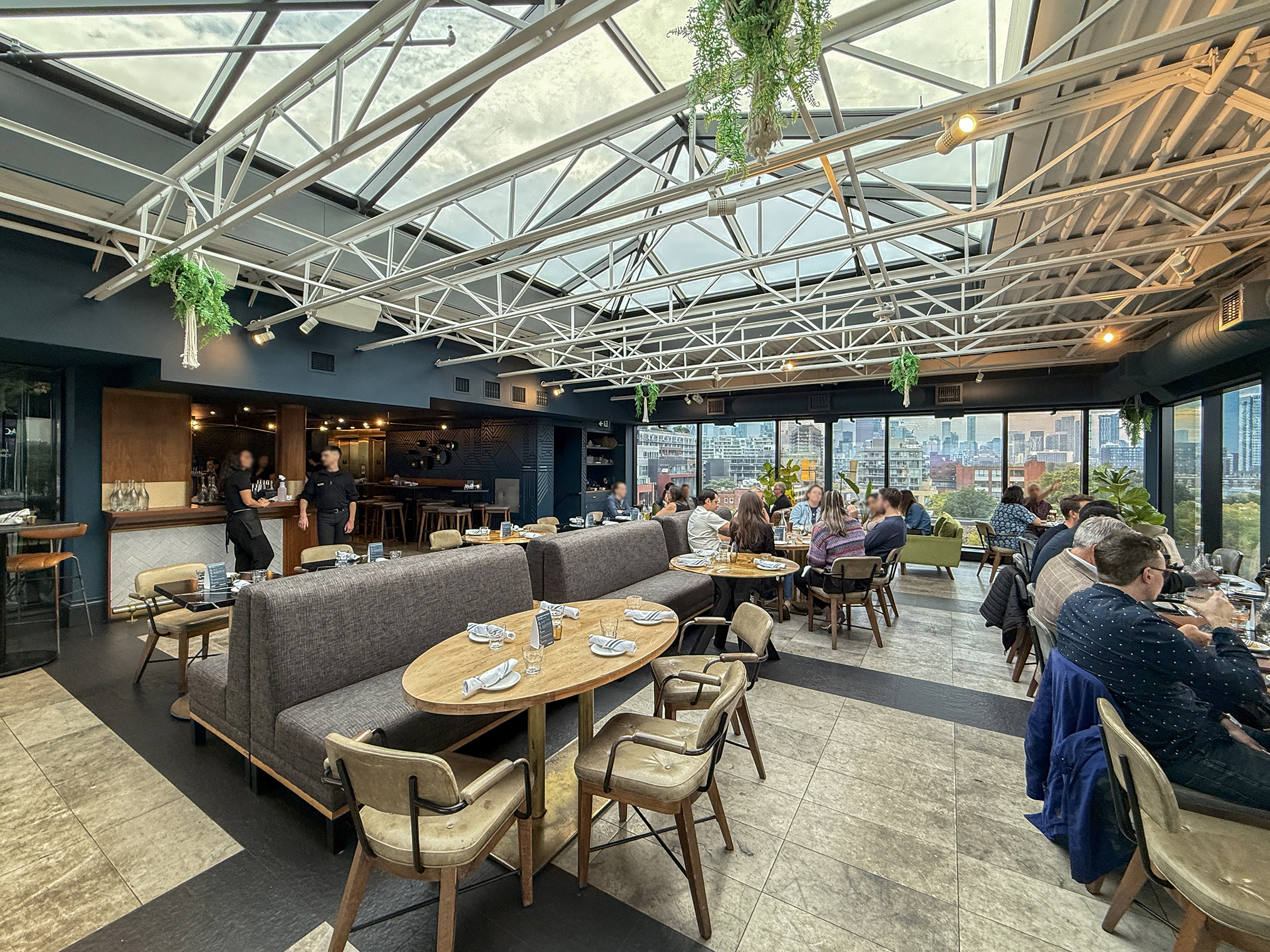
The Rooftop restaurant

The Broadview Hotel is a 58 room boutique hotel in Toronto, Ontario, Canada. It is located at the intersection of Broadview Avenue and Queen Street East in Toronto's Riverside neighbourhood. Built in 1893, the building was originally a hall with retail and office space and later converted into a hotel. Until 2014, the establishment was occupied by the New Broadview House Hotel, a hotel and boarding house housing low-income persons with a strip club named Jilly's on its ground level. It was closed and converted to an up-scale establishment with several restaurants and a roof patio as part of gentrification of the neighbourhood.

The Richardsonian Romanesque style structure was built for Archibald Dingman, an industrialist who owned Pugsley, Dingman and Company which manufactured "electric soap, blackleads and blues." The hall was designed by Robert Ogilvie as a commercial hub and public hall named Dingman's Hall. Its design includes arched windows and a tower characteristic of Romanesque Revival. The southeast vertical edge of the building is rounded using curved, elongated bricks. The building's gray lintels above the windows were likely carved from Credit Valley sandstone, popularly used during Toronto's Victorian era. The east and south exterior walls feature 21 terra cotta relief sculptures each with a unique image, often including a human face. The building had the Canadian Bank of Commerce as a tenant on the ground floor and doctors' and lawyers' offices on the middle floors. Atop the building were two public halls which acted as a venue for concerts and assemblies.

In 1907, the building was sold to Thomas J. Edwards who hired architect George Wallace Gouinlock to transform Dingman's Hall into The Broadview Hotel, which let rooms for $1.50 or more a night. It was known as the Lincoln Hotel for a time in the 1930s before reverting to its original name in the 1940s. By the 1970s, it was the Broadview House, a boarding house renting rooms by the week, with a strip club (later known as Jilly's) on the main floor.

On May 13, 2014, Streetcar Developments and Dream Unlimited announced their purchase of the Hotel, announcing they would close the hotel and redevelop it into a 58-room boutique hotel with a ground floor restaurant and a rooftop bar. The redevelopment is part of an ongoing gentrification of the neighbourhood.

The developers began the process of moving 45 long-term tenants and closed Jilly's that July. The tenants, many of whom received disability or social assistance, were rehoused through a partnership between Streetcar, Dream Unlimited, the City of Toronto government, and WoodGreen Community Services. The developers paid first and last months' rent and paid WoodGreen to hire two staff persons to assist the tenants in finding new homes, Sleep Country contributed mattresses, and The Furniture Barn contributed furnishings

In late 2016, the exterior of the building had completed renovations. Black cornices that were removed in prior years were recreated based on period photos. The renovation was awarded a Lieutenant Governor's Ontario Heritage Award for Excellence in Conservation. A major addition during the renovation was the addition of a glassed-in rooftop restaurant on the building's north side. While the bulk of the building is four stories high, the rooftop restaurant and the hotel tower are on higher levels.

As part of the redevelopment, the owners renamed the hotel from the "New Broadview Hotel" to "The Broadview Hotel". Some of the guest rooms feature prints of pin-up girls, a reminder of the former Jilly's. The new facility will also have two event spaces, a cafe/bar and two other restaurants. There is also a space displaying memorabilia from Jilly's, such as posters, dancing poles and entertainers' lockers. The building uses extensive lighting to highlight the brickwork.

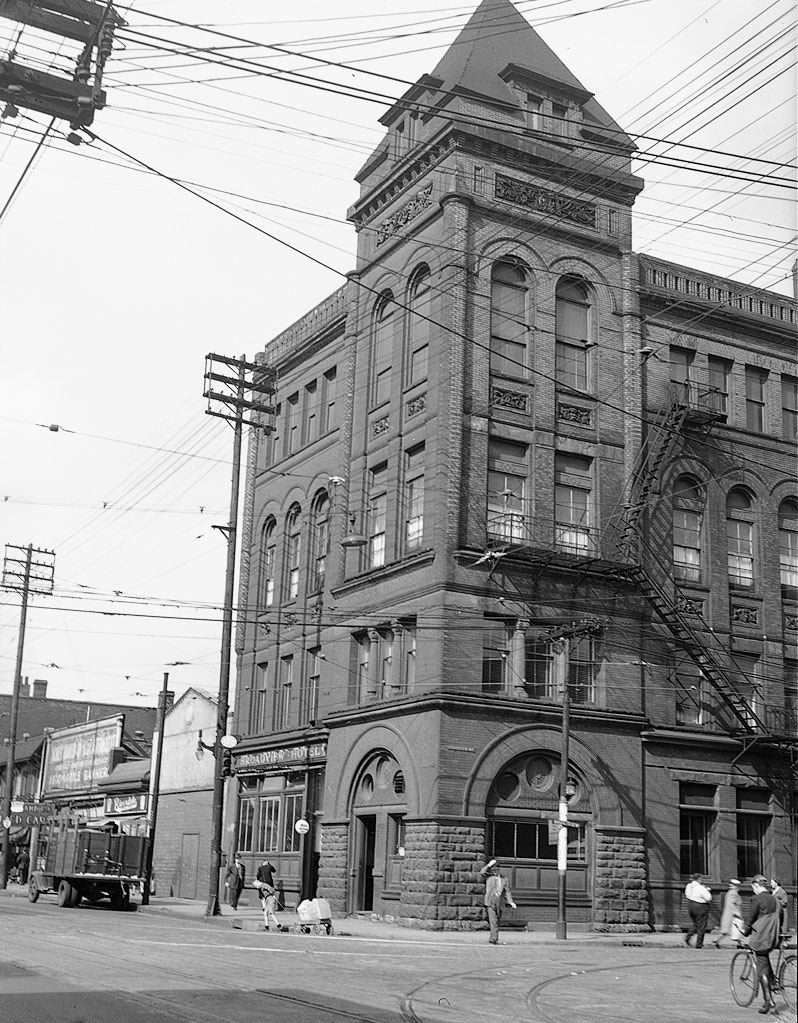
Hotel in 1945

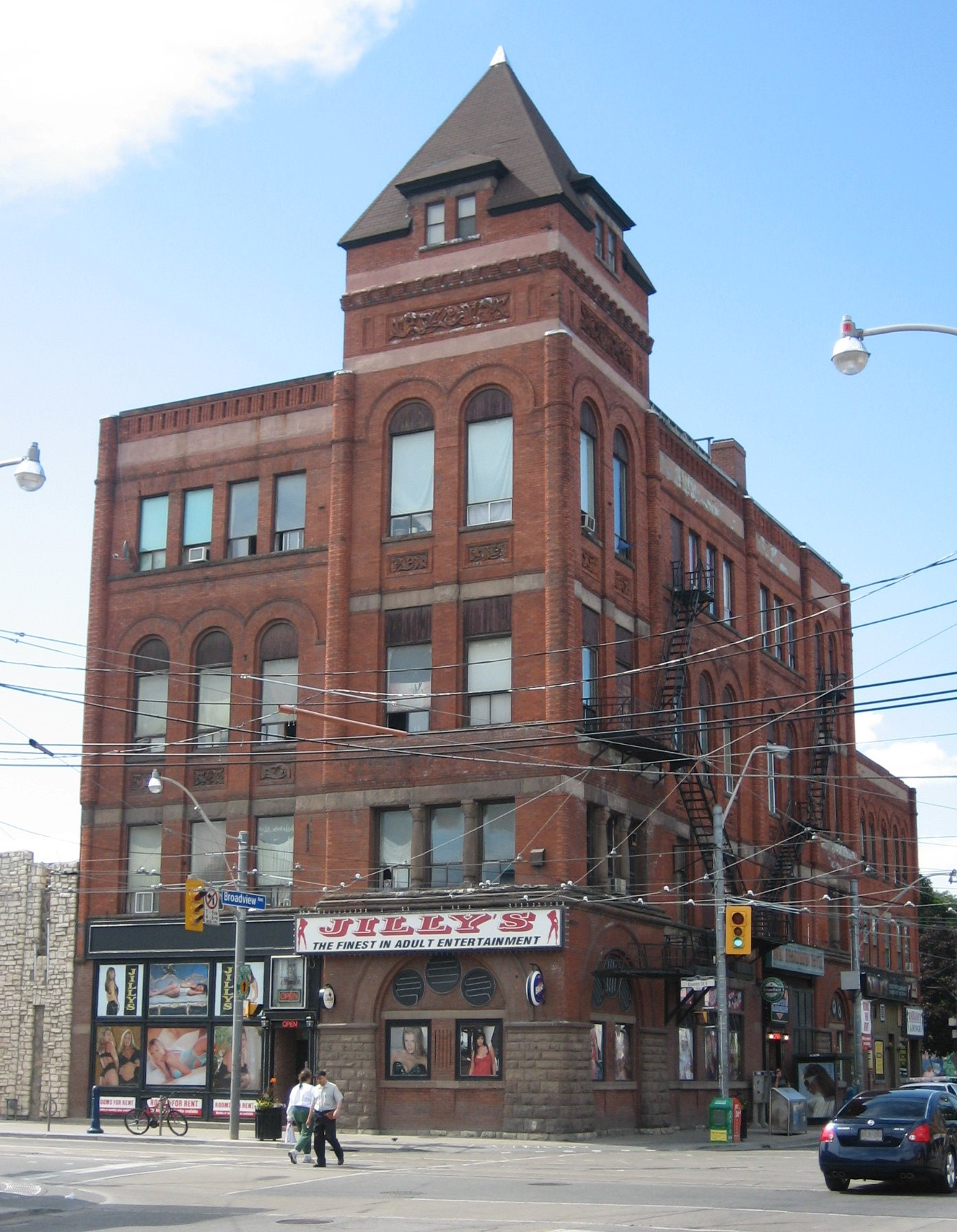
Hotel before restoration

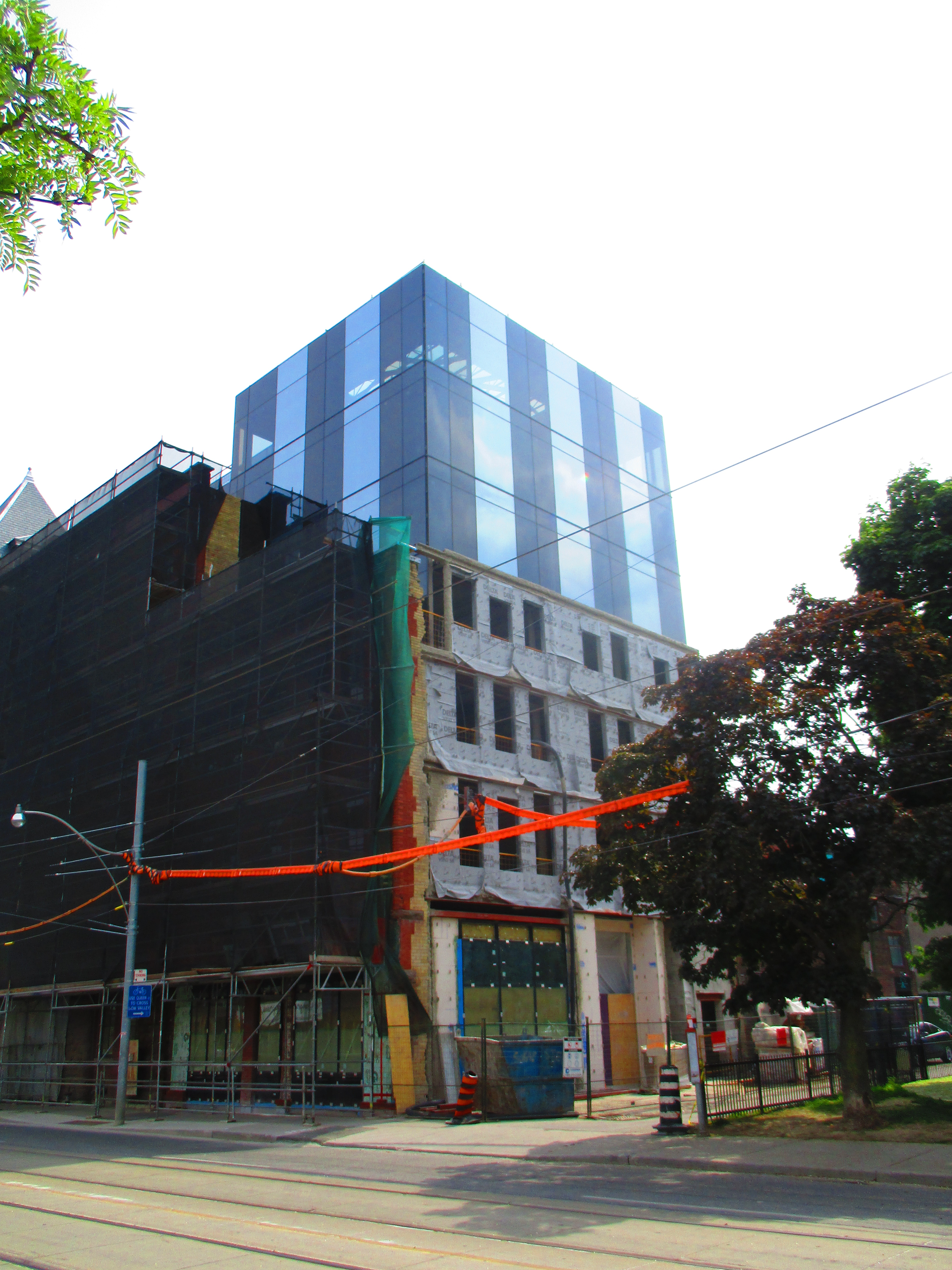
Hotel during the renovation in 2016

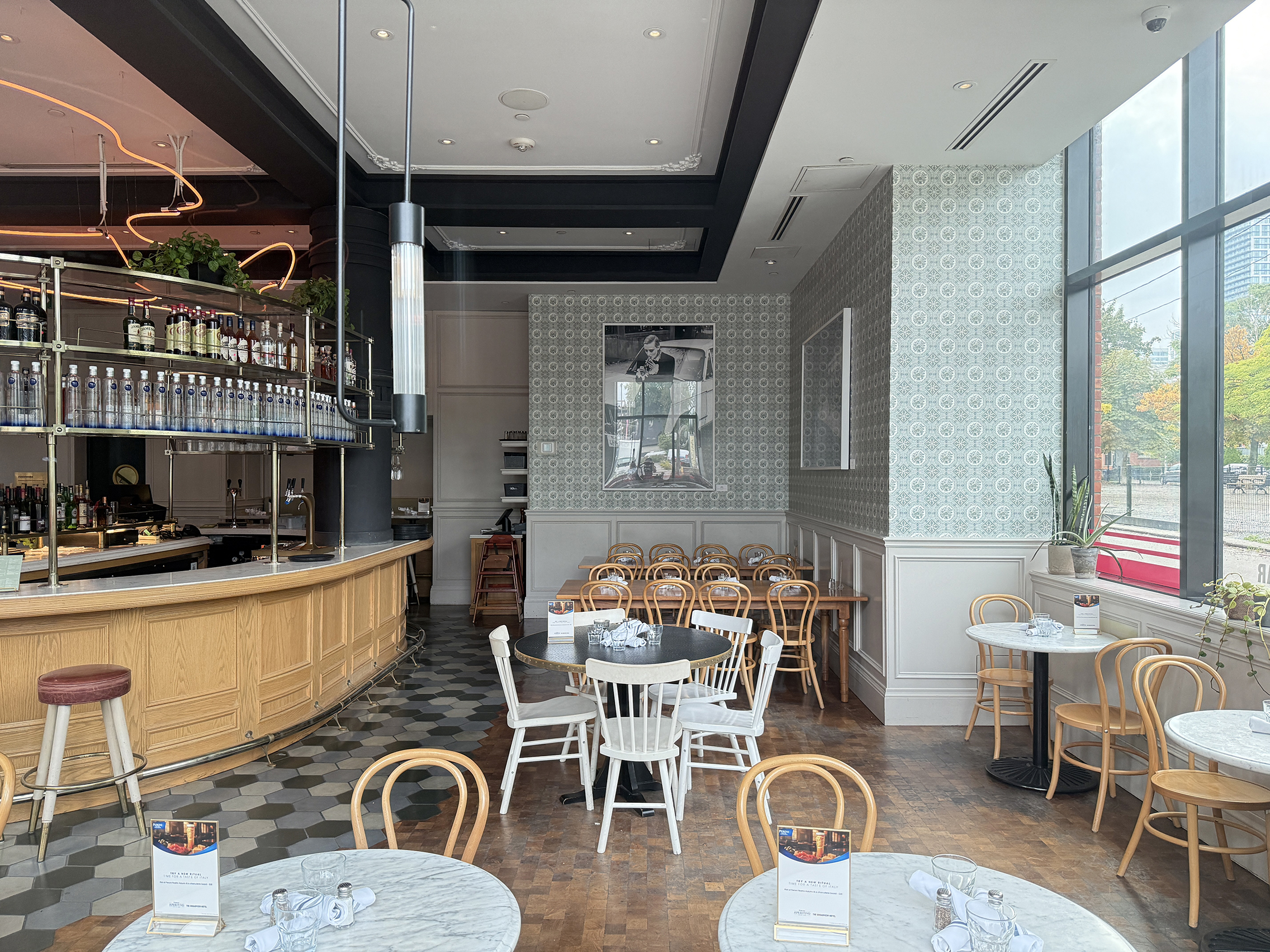
Bistro + Bar

== See also ==
- Drake Hotel
- East Chinatown
- The Edwin, formerly the New Edwin Hotel
- Gladstone Hotel
