= Medieval Times =

Family dinner theater

Medieval Times Dinner and Tournament
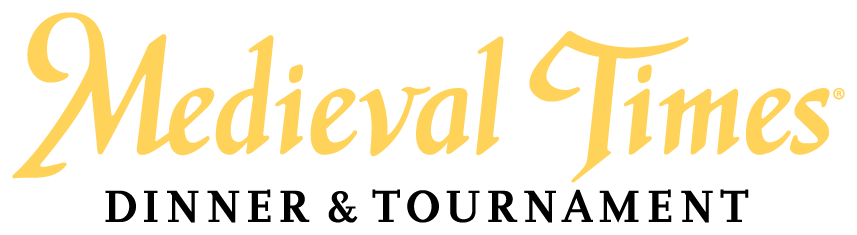

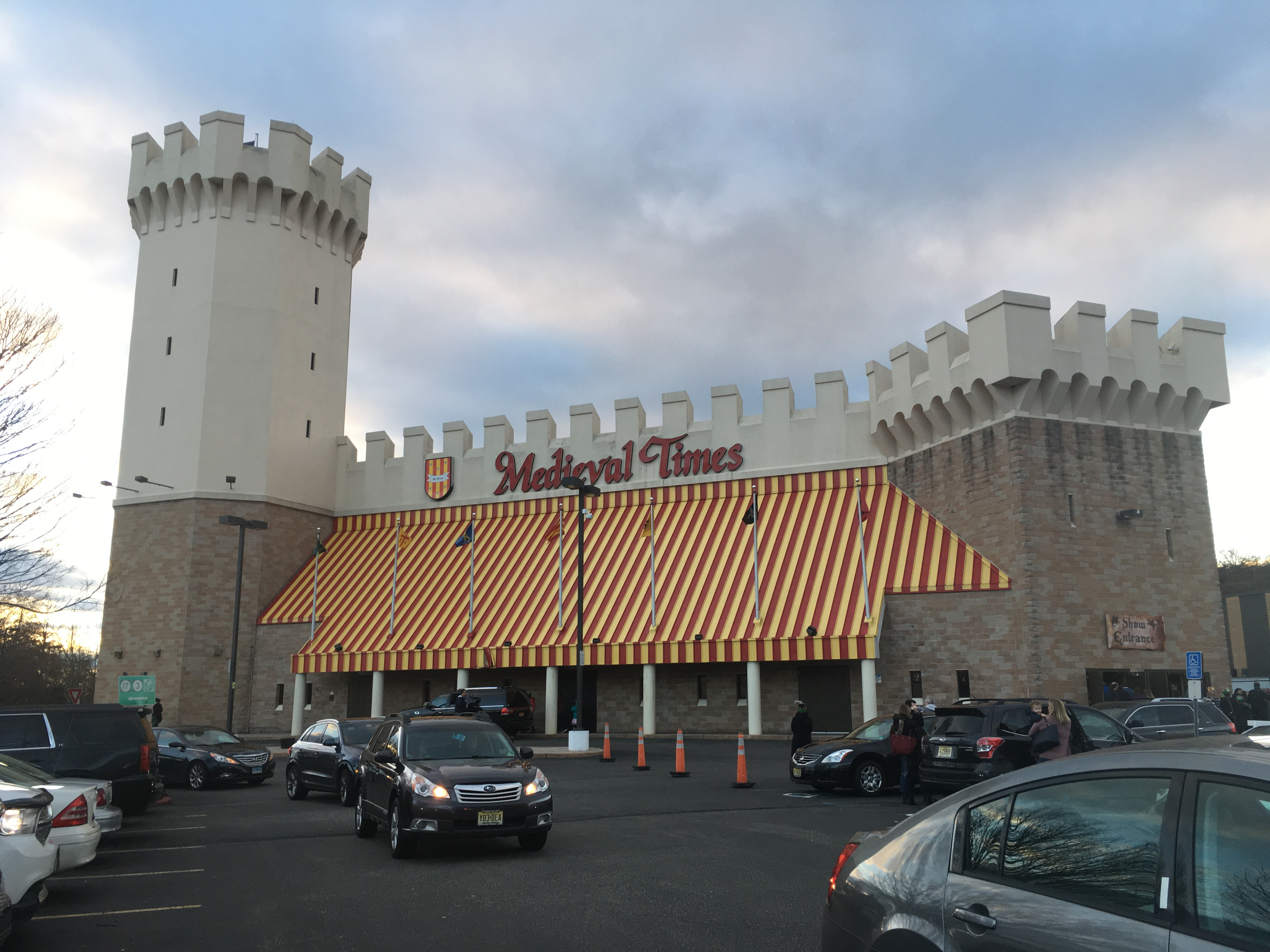
- Medieval Times building exterior in Lyndhurst, New Jersey
- Type: Private
- Industry: Entertainment
- Founded: December 16, 1983; 42 years ago in Kissimmee, Florida, US
- Headquarters: Irving, Texas, U.S.
- Number of locations: 10
- Area served: United States and Canada
- Services: Dinner theater
- Website: www.medievaltimes.com

Medieval Times Dinner and Tournament is an American dinner theater featuring staged medieval-style games, sword-fighting, and jousting. Medieval Times Entertainment, the holding company, is headquartered in Irving, Texas.

There are ten locations: the nine in the United States are built as castles; the tenth, in Toronto, Ontario, Canada, is located inside the CNE Government Building.

== History ==
Medieval Times in Schaumburg, Illinois, displaying the coat of arms of Peralada, Catalonia, and the Viscounts Rocabertí, lords of Peralada Castle. Medieval Times founder Jose Montaner was uncle to the Count of Perelada, with the Count holding stock in the company until 2016.

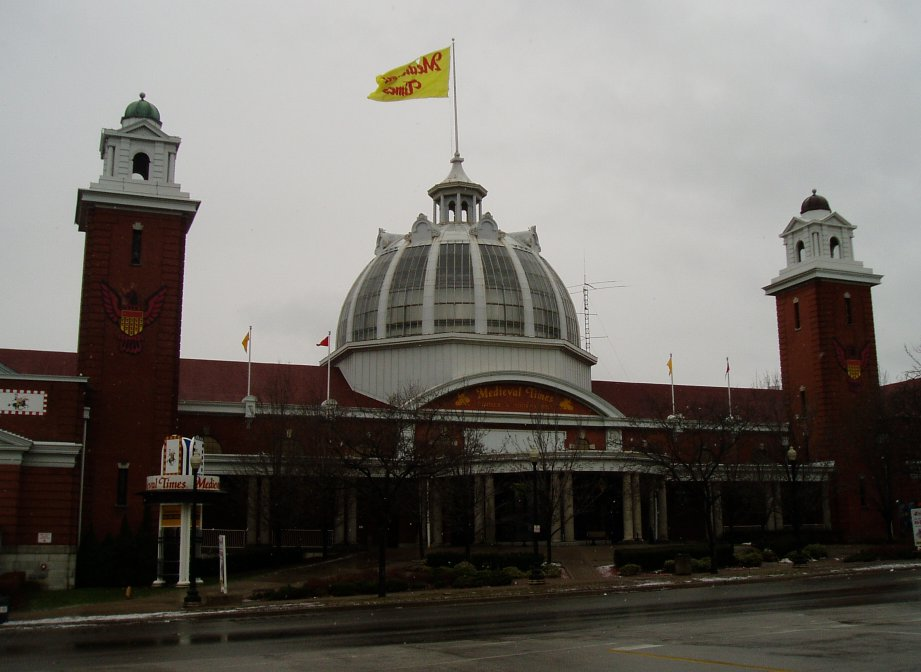
Medieval Times at Exhibition Place in Toronto, Ontario, Canada. It opened during the 1993 Canadian National Exhibition.

The first two Medieval Times-styled shows were developed in the late 1960s by Jose Montaner in Spain at Mallorca and Benidorm. Montaner converted the barbecue restaurant on the family farm to entertainment and food venue. Actors portrayed 11th-century jousting of knights of the northern Spanish and southern French kingdoms of Aragon, Navarre, and the village of Perelada, using stories derived from Montaner's family history. Montaner claims to be a descendant of Charlemagne, the first Holy Roman Emperor. Accounts indicated that Tino Braña, who was involved in the jousting scenes from the 1961 film El Cid, was involved in staging the jousts since he started working with the Spanish productions in 1978. Russell Allen, the then-assistant production manager of the Lyndhurst, New Jersey location, told The Star-Ledger that it would take nearly six to eight months to fully train the actors - first with the combat sequences and then their acting skills.

On December 16, 1983, the Spanish investment group Manver (incorporated in the Netherlands Antilles) opened their first United States location in Kissimmee, Florida, about twenty minutes from Walt Disney World. In 1986, they opened their second establishment near Knott's Berry Farm in California. The franchise later expanded, opening locations in major cities in the Southern United States and elsewhere, including Atlanta, Georgia; Dallas, Texas; Myrtle Beach, South Carolina; Baltimore, Maryland; Schaumburg, Illinois; Lyndhurst, New Jersey; Scottsdale, Arizona; and Toronto, Ontario.

In April 1997, the franchises in Florida and California sought bankruptcy protection after losing a court battle with the IRS that required the Buena Park location to pay US$7.5 million and the Orlando location to pay $2.5 million in back taxes (equivalent to about $15 and $5M in 2025). According to the IRS, Medieval Times improperly deducted royalties, loan interest, and management fees in the 1987 and 1989 tax years. When asked why the company was filing for bankruptcy, Alan Friedman, the company's bankruptcy lawyer, told Los Angeles Times "One of the primary reasons for filing was to prevent the IRS from beginning to seize any assets."

The shows change about every six to seven years. A show that premiered in 2017 was notable for being for the first time that lead role was filled by a Queen, rather than a King. This change was due to feedback from guests who wanted to see women in more significant acting roles. The company also stated that it took two months to teach a Queen how to ride an Andalusian horse. The newest show premiered in late 2024, where a king and queen, each leading their own respective kingdoms, forge an alliance.

Since 2016, Jose's son, Perico Montaner, has been the president and CEO of the private company, which is headquartered in Irving, Texas. As of October 2017, Medieval Times had served over 65 million guests across its entire history as a franchise.

=== Potential film adaptation ===
In 2013, Deadline Hollywood reported that production companies Benderspink and Broken Road Productions secured the rights to produce a feature film adaptation of the Medieval Times dinner theater. This was announced just months before the company's 30th anniversary. Although the production companies attempted to shop the film to major film studios, the film adaptation would not receive another update until 2026, when Paramount Pictures bought rights based on a pitch from screenwriter Blaise Hemingway. The film, which currently has Eric Appel signed on to direct, will be about a struggling employee at the Orlando location who accidentally unleashes a 9th century knight alongside an ancient evil necromancer.

=== 2023 Medieval Times strike ===
On May 31, 2022, employees at Medieval Times in New Jersey filed for a union election with the NLRB, working with the American Guild of Variety Artists. In October 2022, the company sued the union over name and logo trademark violations; the suit was subsequently dismissed, though Medieval Times was able to pressure TikTok to shut the union's social media account on intellectual property grounds. In November 2022, employees at the Buena Park location also won a union election 27–18 to join the American Guild of Variety Artists, and initiated a strike soon after, in February 2023, over pay and safety concerns. After nine months on strike, in November, the union said it would end the strike and return to work while the negotiating team continues to fight for a "safe and equitable" work environment for cast, crew and animals.

== In popular culture ==
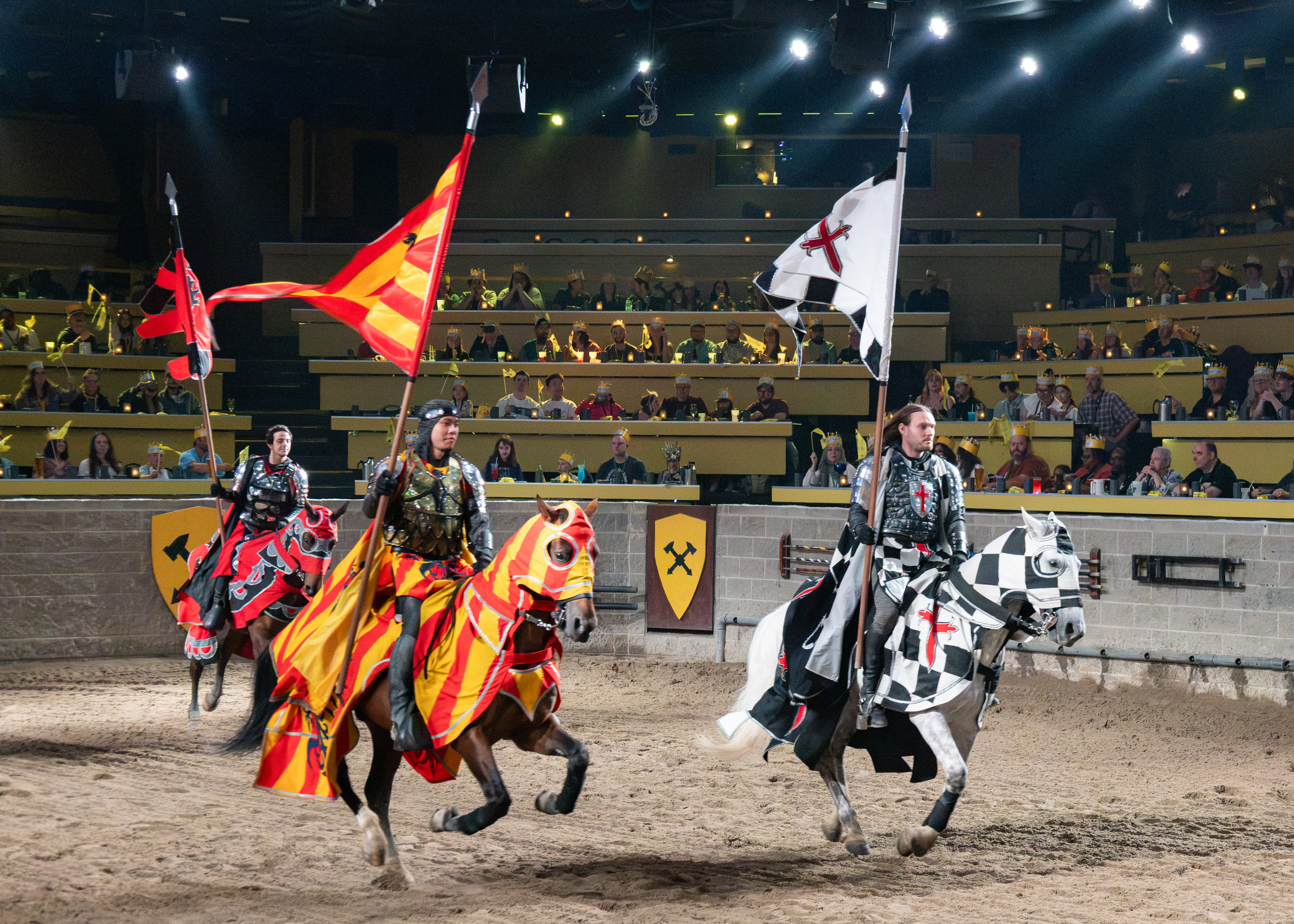
Medieval Times performance in Toronto, Canada

The dinner theatre was featured in a pivotal scene in the 1996 film The Cable Guy, where the titular character (Jim Carrey) engages in an intense duel with a reluctant Steven (Matthew Broderick). The scene also features a humorous scene where a "serving wench" (Janeane Garofalo) tells her customers that there were no utensils during the medieval times before offering them a refill on their Pepsi beverage. It was filmed at the Buena Park, California location in January 1996 while the location was closed for nine days. Around the same time, the chain collaborated with select Sony movie theatres to send ticket-buyers for "The Cable Guy" discounts for the Medieval Times. As a result of the promotion, "The Cable Guy" boosted ticket sales for the Medieval Times restaurant, including a 30% increase in the Lyndhurst, New Jersey location.

During the theatrical release of The Cable Guy, employees from Medieval Times expressed mixed reactions to its appearance in the film. On the one hand, restaurant managers were delighted with the publicity the film brought out. On the other hand, a female employee expressed disappointment at the depiction of the serving wench in the film. Also, spokesperson David Manuel stressed that the theatre would never allow customers to fight in the pit, noting that each of the actors on stage needed extensive training - especially with horse riding and swordsmanship.

Medieval Times was also featured in the 2004 feature film Garden State, featuring Jim Parsons as a knight. It has been featured in episodes of TV shows such as Friends, Cake Boss, Hell's Kitchen, The Celebrity Apprentice, Close Enough, Walker, Texas Ranger, and Saturday Night Live.

A 2026 Vanity Fair article shed light on unionization efforts, multiple lawsuits against the organization, and claims of sexual harassment and animal abuse.

== Locations ==
Locations of the Medieval Times castles —

As of 2025, the Medieval Times has opened ten locations: nine in the United States and one in Canada.

=== United States ===
- Orlando Castle (December 16, 1983, Kissimmee, Florida)
- Buena Park Castle (June 5, 1986, Buena Park, California)
- Lyndhurst Castle (February 14, 1990, Lyndhurst, New Jersey)
- Chicago Castle, (June 15, 1991, Schaumburg, Illinois)
- Dallas Castle (June 12, 1992, Dallas, Texas)
- Myrtle Beach Castle (June 18, 1995, Myrtle Beach, South Carolina)
- Baltimore Castle (August 22, 2003, at Arundel Mills, Hanover, Maryland)
- Atlanta Castle (July 21, 2006, at Sugarloaf Mills, Lawrenceville, Georgia)
- Scottsdale Castle (August 2, 2019, Scottsdale, Arizona)

=== Canada ===
- Toronto Castle (August 18, 1993, Toronto, Ontario) (Note: coincided with the 1993 Canadian National Exhibition.)

== See also ==
- List of dinner theaters
- Le Puy du Fou
