= Alderwood Collegiate Institute =

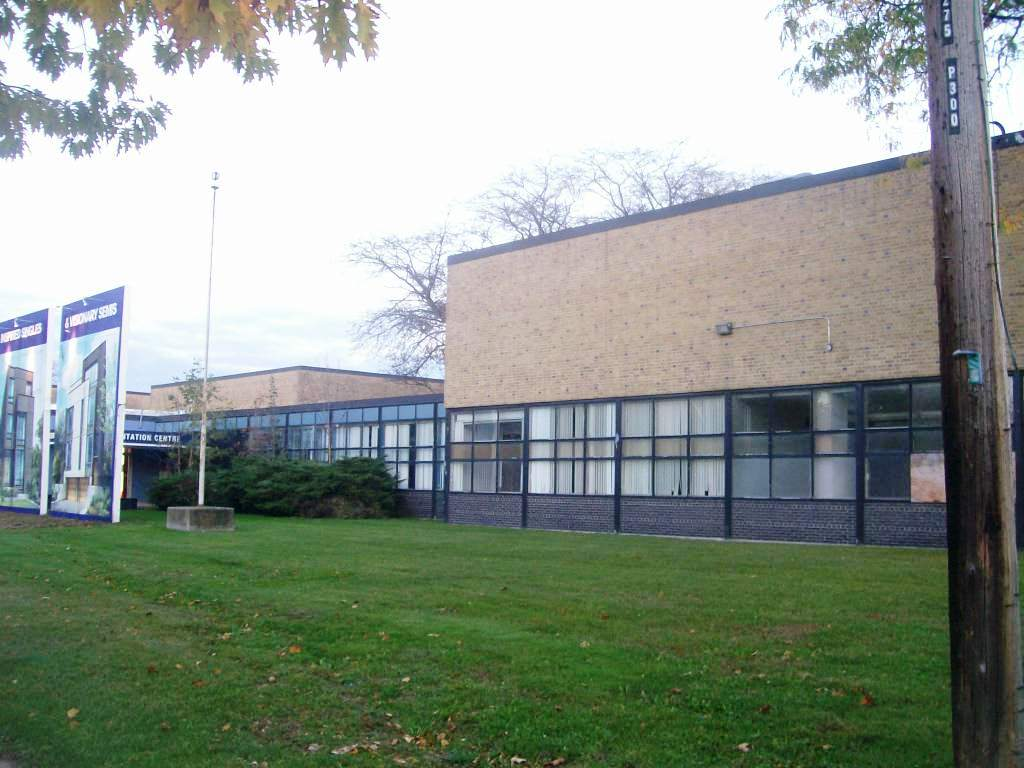
- Alderwood Collegiate, built in 1955, seen in 2013 prior to demolition.

Location
- 300 Valermo Drive; Alderwood, Etobicoke, Ontario, M8W 2L1; Canada; 43°36′34″N 79°32′02″W

Information
- School type: Public, high school
- Motto: Scientia Cum Amicitia (With the knowledge of Friendship)
- Founded: 1955
- Status: Demolished, northern portion partially remains
- Closed: 1983
- School board: Toronto District School Board (Etobicoke Board of Education)
- Oversight: Toronto Lands Corporation
- Superintendent: Sandra Tondat; LN19
- Area trustee: Patrick Nunziata; Ward 3
- School number: 891118
- Grades: 9-13
- Enrollment: 786
- Language: English
- Area: Alderwood
- Colours: Gold, and Black
- Team name: Alderwood Auggies
- Website: www.alderwoodcollegiate.com

Alderwood Collegiate Institute (Alderwood CI, ACI, or Alderwood), named Alderwood Secondary School and Alderwood High School prior is a former public high school that existed from 1955 to 1983 under the governance of the Etobicoke Board of Education (now part of the Toronto District School Board) and that served the Alderwood neighbourhood in the former city of Etobicoke in Toronto, Ontario, Canada.

The school merged with New Toronto Secondary School to form Lakeshore Collegiate Institute in 1983. The portion of the Alderwood property was transferred to the TDSB's realtor arm, Toronto Lands Corporation (TLC) in 2011 and sold to Urbancorp, a housing developer in August 2012.

== See also ==
- List of high schools in Ontario

== Notable alumni ==
- Gary Edwards – former NHL player
- Brian McCutcheon – former NHL player
- Gayle Olinek(ova) - athlete, writer of books on exercise and healthy lifestyles
- Bob Russell – former WHA player
- Chris Sheppard - musician in BKS - launched the Juno Award-winning dance group
- Ian Waddell - politician, author
- Barry Webster - writer
- Trudy Young - actor, television presenter
