= Alderwood, Toronto =

Alderwood
- Neighbourhood
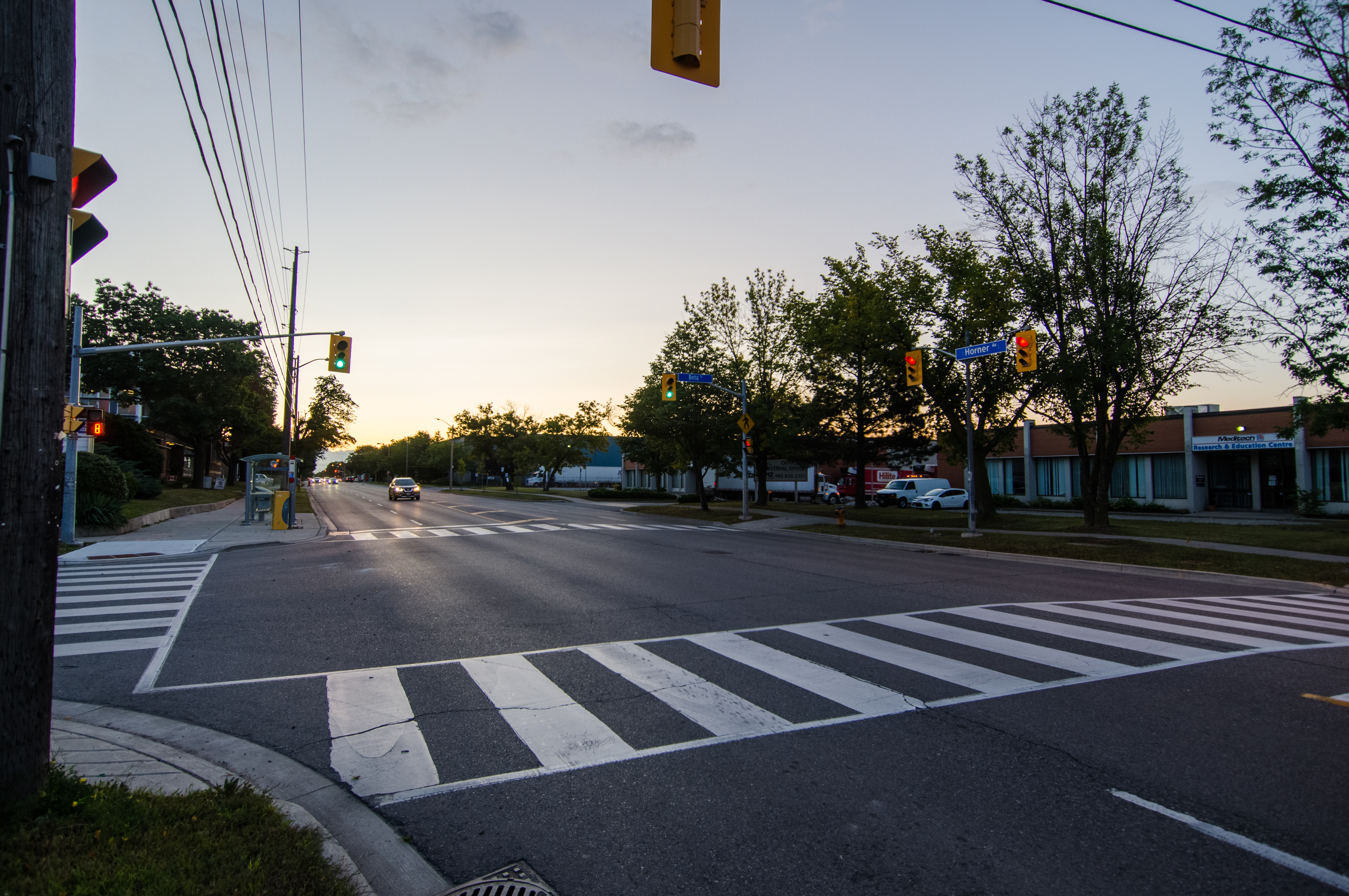
- View of Alderwood from Horner Avenue and Beta Street

- Location within Toronto
- Coordinates: 43°36′27″N 79°32′25″W
- Country: Canada
- Province: Ontario
- City: Toronto
- Established: 1850 Etobicoke Township
- Developed: 1918 (Subdivision) 'New Toronto Park'
- Established as Postal Village: 1933
- Changed Municipality: 1998 Toronto from Etobicoke

Government
  - MP: James Maloney (Etobicoke—Lakeshore)
  - MPP: Christine Hogarth (Etobicoke—Lakeshore)
  - Councillor: Mark Grimes (Ward 3 Etobicoke—Lakeshore)

Alderwood is a neighbourhood in the city of Toronto, Ontario, Canada. It is in the western section of Toronto, within the district of Etobicoke. It is bounded by the Etobicoke Creek to the west, the Gardiner Expressway to the north, the CPR railway to the east and the CNR railway to the south.

Alderwood is named after Etobicoke, the municipality of which it originally was a part, which is a native word meaning "place where the alder trees grow."

== History ==
With Long Branch, Alderwood was originally part of Col Sam Smith's land. In 1850, Archibald Cameron purchased four farm lots of this land comprising most of the area that is now Alderwood; he built his home 'Ashfield' on what is now Beta Street. In 1874 Archibald Cameron was facing bankruptcy and sold his farm lots to Daniel Horner, who later served as a prominent member of Etobicoke Township's Council; Horner Avenue is named after him. The naming of Alderwood's main street was a hotly debated issue in the early community between the Brown and O'Connor families; today it is called Brown's Line.

Alderwood Subdivided

About 1920 what is now Alderwood was first planned as an extension of the newly incorporated Town of New Toronto and was originally called 'New Toronto Heights' or 'New Toronto Park ' with the first streets planned in a simple grid pattern with names from the Greek alphabet (Beta, Gamma, Delta). Alderwood was still part of the original Etobicoke township. In 1933 Alderwood became a postal village remaining in Etobicoke Township although closely connected to the independent municipalities Long Branch and New Toronto to the south, but separated by the railway. Although Alderwood did not undergo significant growth until after the Second World War, many industries moved into the area along Brown's Line during the war years. Alderwood was further disconnected from the rest of Etobicoke Township to the north by the construction of the Queen Elizabeth Way in the 1930s and the industrialisation of much of Etobicoke immediately to the north which cemented Alderwood's closer attachment to the independent municipalities of Long Branch and New Toronto to the south. After the war, increased immigration, particularly from eastern Europe, led to the rapid urbanisation of the area which continued until the end of the 1960s.

Modern Alderwood

In 1967 the independent municipalities formed out of Etobicoke Township were re-amalgamated with Etobicoke to create the Borough of Etobicoke which became a city in 1983. In 1998 the City of Etobicoke was merged with six other cities and the Metropolitan Toronto government to form an amalgamated City of Toronto. With Alderwood remaining an area with only little commercial space and low-rise single homes, the neighbourhood experienced population stagnation and decline as the children of older residents moved out, forcing the Public School Board to close Franklin Horner Middle School and Alderwood Collegiate. Alderwood Collegiate became a Separate (Catholic) High School, 'Fr John Redmond' which has recently moved from the dilapidated site to a new home in New Toronto. The area has most recently been at the centre of a debate over historic preservation as the Horner's 'Ashfield' home at the centre of the community was demolished.

== Character ==
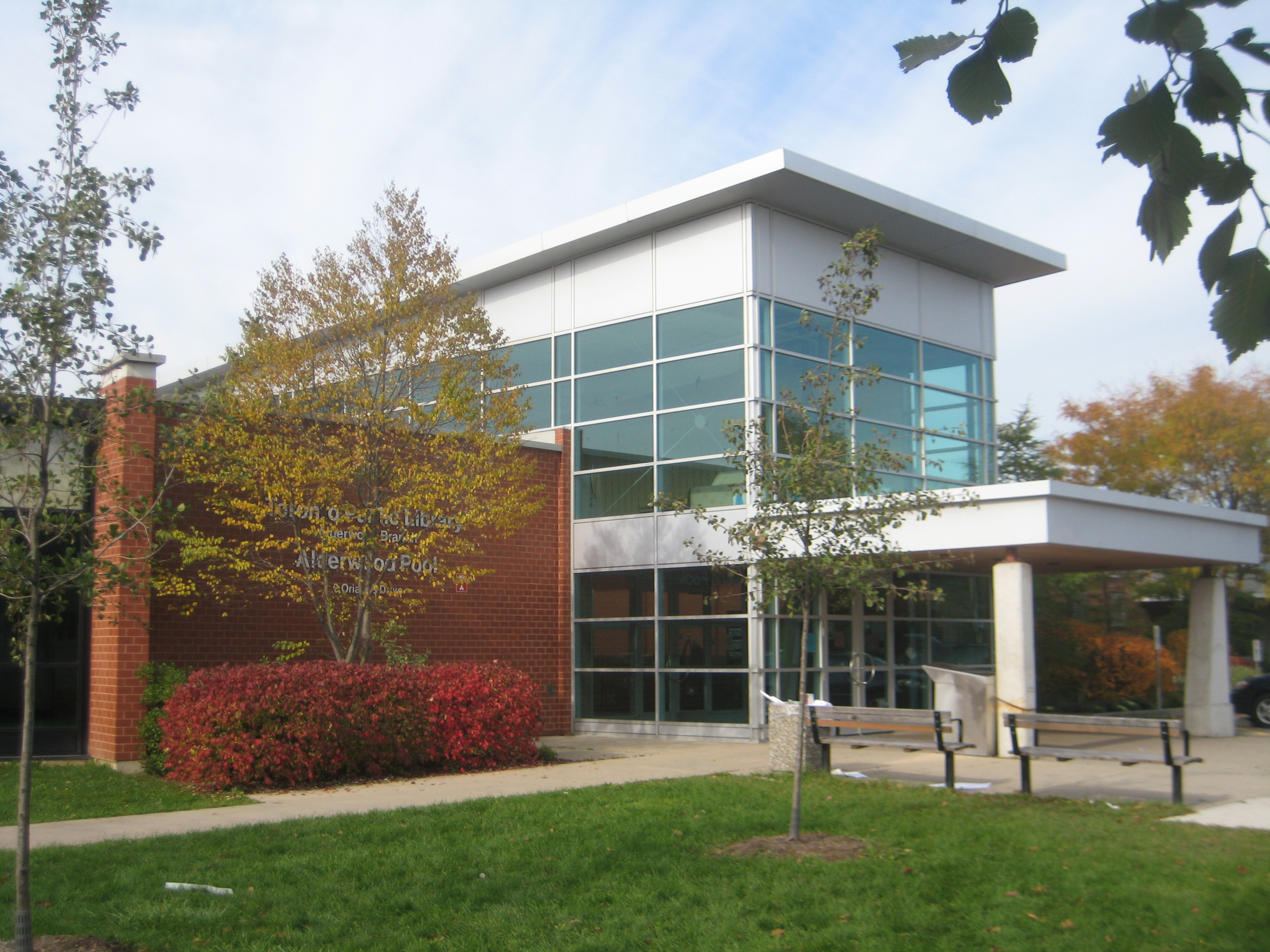
The Alderwood branch of the Toronto Public Library is located on Horner Avenue.

Alderwood is characterized by single family homes, many of which were constructed at the end of the Second World War. Schools in the neighbourhood include École Sir Adam Beck Junior School and Lanor Junior Middle School. The neighbourhood was formerly served by a high school (Alderwood Collegiate Institute, later Father John Redmond Secondary School), but the school is vacant today. Another closed school, Franklin Horner Junior Middle School, is home to the Franklin Horner Community Centre.

The Alderwood Centre is a public complex that houses Sir Adam Beck Junior School, the Alderwood branch of the Toronto Public Library system, the Alderwood Action After School child care centre and the Alderwood Pool, a 25-yard public pool, and is adjacent to an outdoor hockey rink.

The south east quadrant of the neighbourhood is zoned industrial and is home to manufacturing and warehousing businesses of various sizes. Among these is a Daimler-Chrysler casting plant.

== Institutions ==
- Alderwood Public Library
- Alderwood Public Pool
- Alderwood Plaza
- Alderwood Memorial Park
- Etobicoke Valley Park
- Connorvale Park (named after O'Connor family home)
- Franklin Horner Community Centre (formerly Franklin Horner Middle School)

=== Churches ===
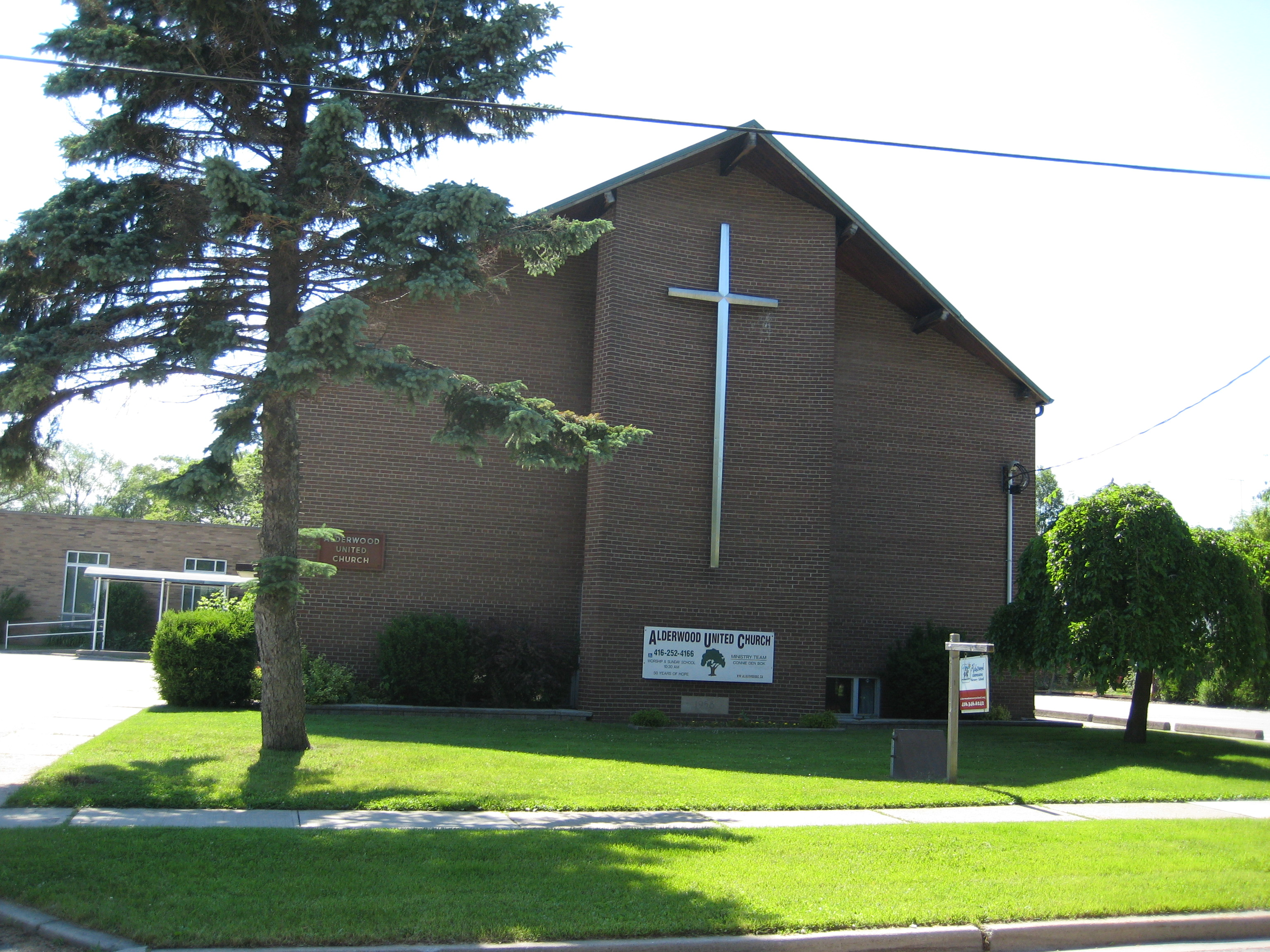
Alderwood United Church is located in the neighbourhood.

- St Ambrose Roman Catholic Church
- Alderwood United Church
- Our Lady of the Miraculous Medal Slovenian Catholic Church
- Holy Family Coptic Catholic Church
- Church of the Atonement (Anglican)

== Education ==
- Lanor Junior Middle School is a public elementary school located at the west end Lanor Avenue. It was built in 1952. The school was originally a junior school and became a junior middle school in 1984 when Franklin Horner Middle School was closed. Lanor is known for its great sports teams who have won few competitions, however, have always been good sports. It is also famous for its drama program which puts on 3 performances a year and its music program with guitars for every student. Many students from Sir Adam Beck Junior School come to Lanor in Grade 6, since Sir Adam Beck only goes up to Grade 5. Lanor's home high school is Lakeshore CI.
- Sir Adam Beck Junior School is a public elementary school on Horner Avenue south of the Gardiner Expressway and west of Browns Line. It was first opened in 1921 in the honour of the founder of Ontario Hydro. The new school was built on the same property in 1999. This school only goes up to grade 5.
- Douglas Park Junior School was a public elementary school located at the east end of Lanor Ave on the north east corner of the 14 acre property shared with [Alderwood Collegiate Institute. It opened in 1956 and taught classes from Junior Kindergarten to grade 6. Today, the building is occupied by the New Haven Learning Centre.
- St Ambrose Catholic Elementary School is a catholic elementary school on Coules Court and has served as an elementary school since the 1950s. Most of its students went on to the local high school Father John Redmond Catholic Secondary School after completing grade 8.
- Franklin Horner Community Centre which opened in the early 1990s was originally Franklin Horner Middle School, a public elementary school. It was built on Horner Avenue in 1910 between Gamma Street and Beta Street; the date plaque faces Gamma Street. It became Franklin Horner Junior High School for grades seven and eight when Lanor Junior School opened in 1952. Lanor Junior School was built for kindergarten to grade six. Franklin Horner Middle School was built on land donated by the Horner family for children. Later called Franklin Horner Middle School, it closed in 1984 due to a decline in student enrolment.
- The first public high school in the Alderwood area, built on Valermo Drive was Alderwood Collegiate Institute. It opened September 6, 1955, with the official opening ceremony November 1955. The school closed in June 1983, and was later occupied by Father John Redmond Catholic Secondary School, which has since moved to the former 'Lakeshore Asylum' grounds in New Toronto. Alderwood Collegiate Institute has had a third life in the entertainment industry as the set the mid-1980s CBC children's series The Edison Twins and again in 2010 as the set for the Steven Spielberg television series Falling Skies. The building has since been demolished in 2014 and townhouses have been built.

== Recreation ==
- Alderwood Softball Association
- Alderwood Softball History
