= George Wallace Gouinlock =

Canadian architect

- Born: August 1, 1861; Paris, Ontario, Canada
- Died: February 13, 1932 (aged 70); Toronto, Ontario, Canada
- Occupation: architect

George Wallace Gouinlock (August 1, 1861 – February 13, 1932) was a prominent Canadian architect. Gouinlock practiced mostly in Toronto, Ontario, Canada, including several designated buildings at Exhibition Place.

His son George Roper Gouinlock (1896–1979) also practised architecture. Son Robert Watson Gouinlock (1892-1966) was a Captain with the Canadian Engineers and served in World War I. Robert was a civil engineer.

== Biography ==
Gouinlock was born in 1861 in Paris, Ontario to Walter and Elizabeth Gouinlock. Gouinlock trained in various cities (including Hamilton, Chicago and Milwaukee) towards becoming an architect. He later moved to Winnipeg, Manitoba as a junior architect with Barber, Bowes & Barber. He came back to Toronto in 1888 and began a partnership with architect Francis S. Baker (as Gouinlock & Baker) from 1888 to 1890.

The bulk of Gouinlock's work was in Toronto. In 1895, he was Chair of the Toronto Society of Architects and President of the Ontario Association of Architects in 1909. Gouinlock retired in 1927.

Gouinlock married Georgina Watson in 1889 and had two sons George Roper and Robert Watson, and a daughter, Laura Huntington (1890-1982)

Gouinlock died on February 13, 1932, and is buried at Mount Pleasant Cemetery in Toronto.

=== George Roper Gouinlock ===
George Wallace's son George Roper Gouinlock (1896-1979) was also an architect, whom with Hugh L. Allward (1899-1971) formed the Allward and Gouinlock partnership in 1935. Allward was the son of sculptor Walter Allward and great-grandfather of Port Perry based landscape architect Hugh Allward. Hugh Allward was succeeded by his nephew Peter L. Allward.

== Projects ==
=== George Wallace Gouinlock projects ===
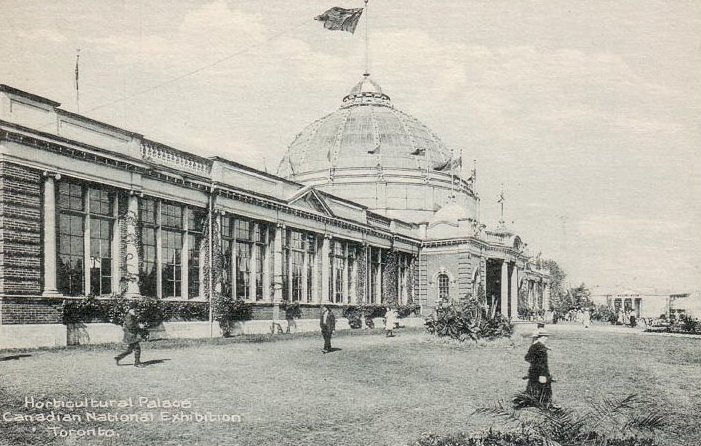
1927 postcard of the Horticultural Palace at the Canadian National Exhibition, Toronto, Ontario, Canada

Many of Gouinlock's buildings were Beaux-Arts. His works also feature other architectural styles. Many buildings at Exhibition Place were designed by Gouinlock:

- Press Building, 210 Princes' Boulevard 1905 (Beaux-Arts)
- Music Building, 285 Manitoba Drive 1907 (Beaux-Arts) - formerly Railway Building
- CNE Grandstand 1907, destroyed by fire 1947 and rebuilt as Exhibition Stadium 1948
- Horticulture Building, 15 Saskatchewan Road 1907 (Beaux-Arts)
- CNE Fire Hall and Police Station, 90 Quebec Street 1912 - (Tudor Revival)
- CNE Government Building 1912 (Beaux-Arts), 10 Dufferin Street - now Medieval Times Building, formerly Government Building and Arts, Crafts and Hobbies Building

Other works across Toronto and beyond included:

- semi detached dwellings at 117-119 Collier Street 1891
- Charles Steinle Meat Packing Company, 256 King Street East 1892 (Richardson Romanesque)
- American Watch Case Company, 511 King Street West 1893. Facade still exists.
- Temple Building, Toronto, Bay and Richmond 1895 (Romanesque Revival) - demolished 1970
- Manitoba Trust Company Building, Winnipeg (Main Street and Pioneer Street) 1899-1900 - with George Creeford Browne and demolished 1974
- Town Hall, St. Marys, Ontario 1901 (Romanesque Revival)
- Bank of Hamilton, 165 Spadina Avenue 1902 - now CIBC branch
- Marshall McLuhan's House (Sir W.T. White House) and Coach House, 39 and 39a Queen's Park Crescent 1903,
- Consumer's Gas Company addition, 23 Toronto Street 1904
- Warwick Bros. and Rutter Publishers, 401 King Street West 1905
- Sovereign Bank, 172 King Street East 1907
- Broadview Hotel renovation 1907
- Canadian Birkbeck Savings and Investment Company Head Office, 10 Adelaide Street East, Toronto 1908 (Edwardian) - now Ontario Heritage Centre
- William Peyton Hubbard House, 660 Broadview Avenue 1909
- Ontario Legislative Building North Wing, 1 Queen's Park Crescent 1909
- MacLean Building, 345 Adelaide Street West 1914
- Princess Margaret Hospital - South Building, University Avenue 1915 - formerly Ontario Hydro-Electric Building
- Art Gallery of Toronto conceptual drawings
- Alexandra Palace, Toronto - demolished

=== George Roper Gouinlock projects ===
- Scarborough High School (1922, partially demolished in 1976) - with Burden and Harold Carter
- Kapuskasing Inn (1927)
- Sensenbrenner Hospital (1927-1929)
- Vaughan Road High School - later as Vaughan Road Academy (1927)
- East York High School - now East York Collegiate Institute (1927 - façade remains after 1986)
- R.H. McGregor Public School - now R.H. McGregor ES (1928 - demolished)
- Newmarket High School (1928)
- Bowmanville High School (1929)
- Daisy Avenue Public School 1929 (Collegiate Gothic) - renamed Vincent Massey Junior School (1964) and Vincent Massey Academy (1985)
- Brockville Collegiate Institute (1929–30)
- Long Branch Public School - now James S. Bell Junior Middle School (1930–31)
- Kapuskasing High School - now Kapuskasing District High School (1932)

=== Allward and Gouinlock projects ===
- 1932 - Eaton Hall, King City
- 1946 Glen Park Public School Toronto - replaced by new school building opened in 1998
- 1949 - East and West Memorial Buildings, Ottawa
- 1959 - David and Mary Thomson Collegiate Institute, Scarborough (Lawrence Avenue East); demolished 2020
- 1961 - Cedarbrae Collegiate Institute, Scarborough
- 1961 - R.H. King Collegiate Institute, Scarborough - western addition
- 1962 - York University Field House, Toronto
- 1965 - Sir Wilfrid Laurier Collegiate Institute, Scarborough
- 1966 - West Humber Collegiate Institute, Etobicoke
- 1965-1968 - McLaughlin Planetarium, Toronto
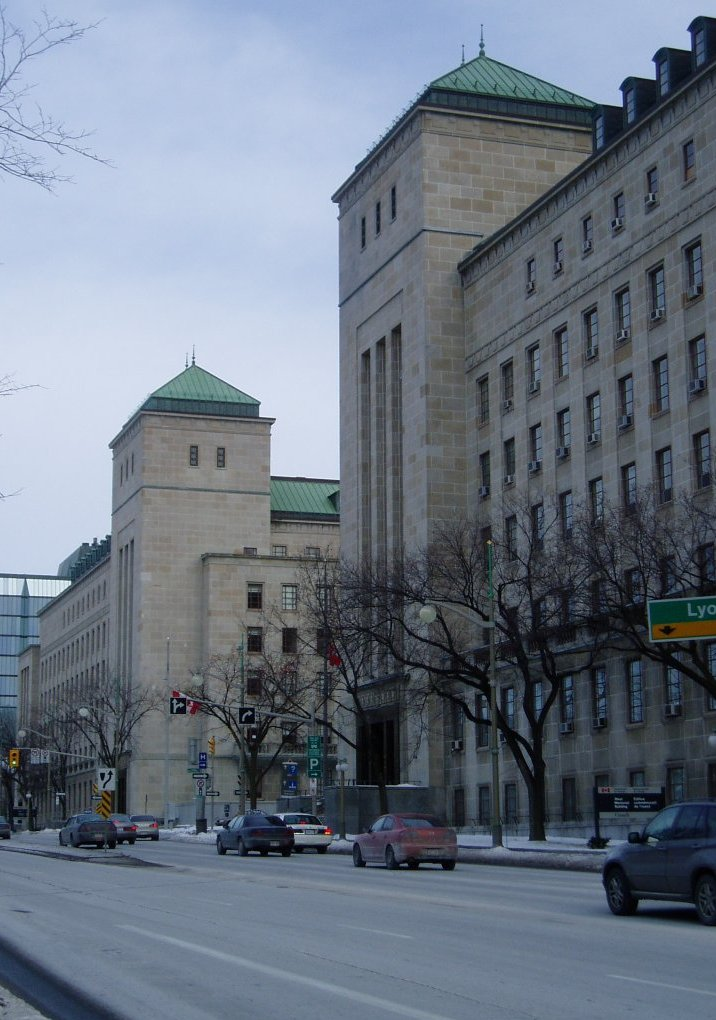
Memorial Buildings, Ottawa

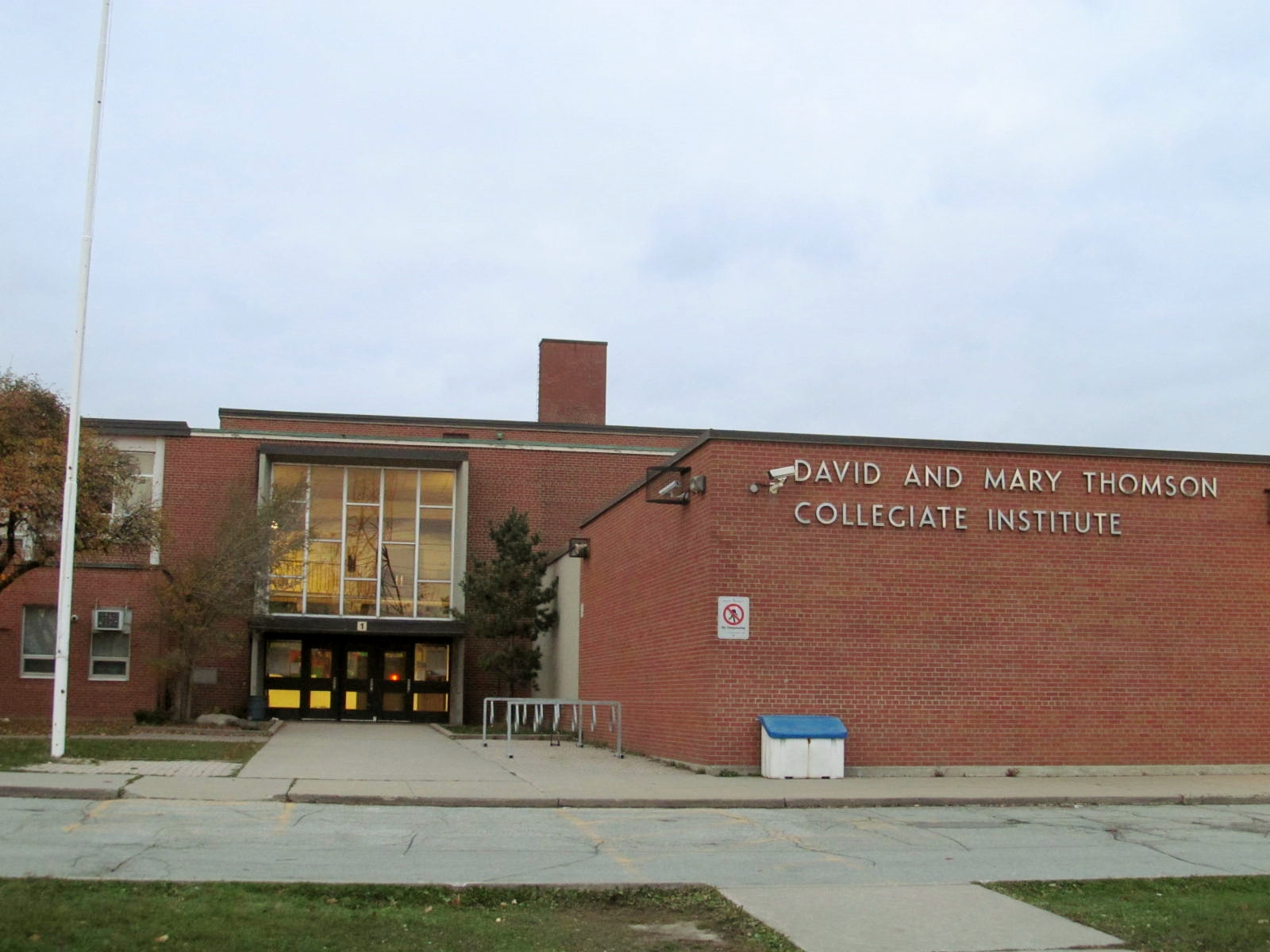
David and Mary Thomson Collegiate Institute

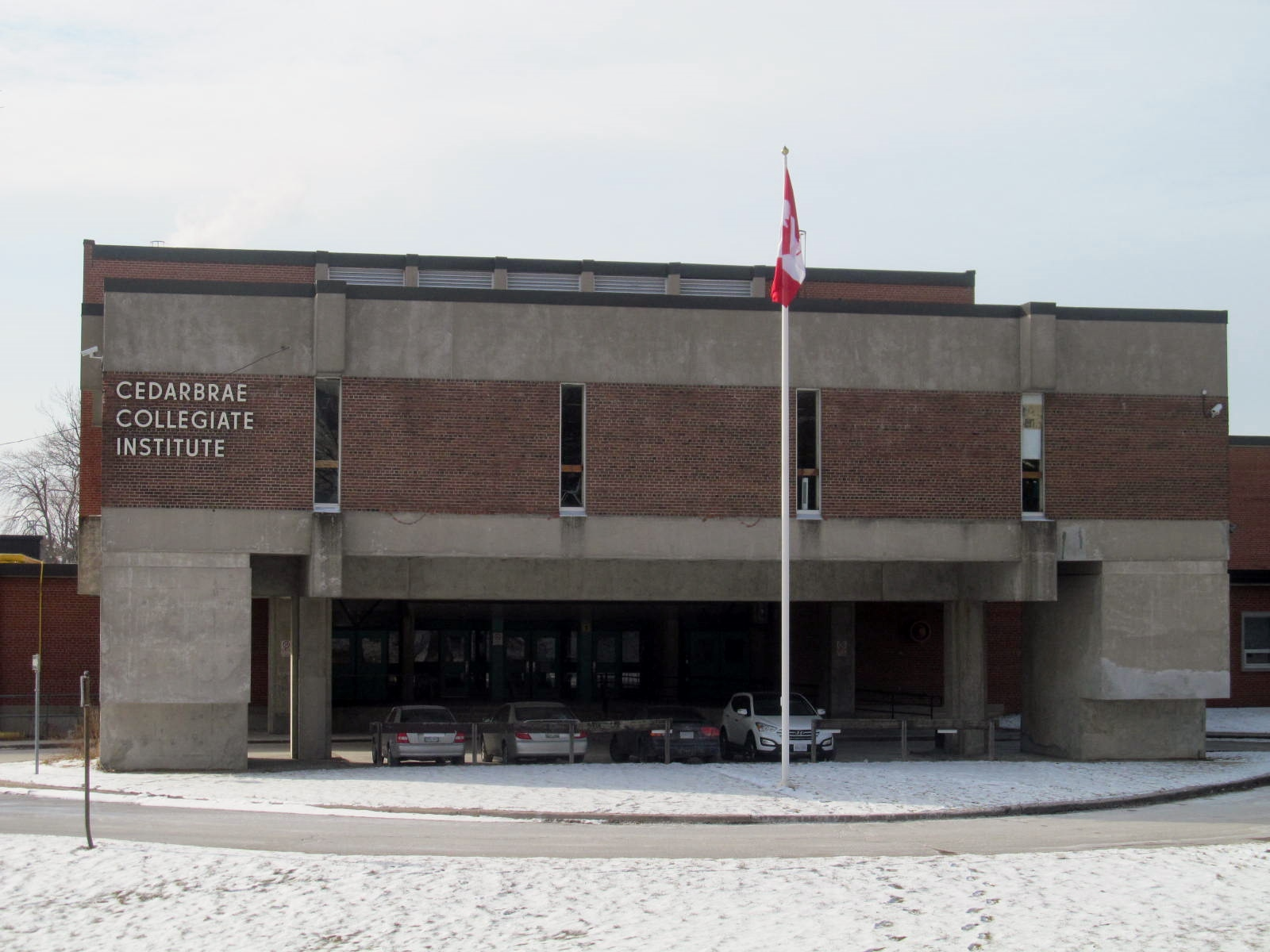
Cedarbrae Collegiate Institute

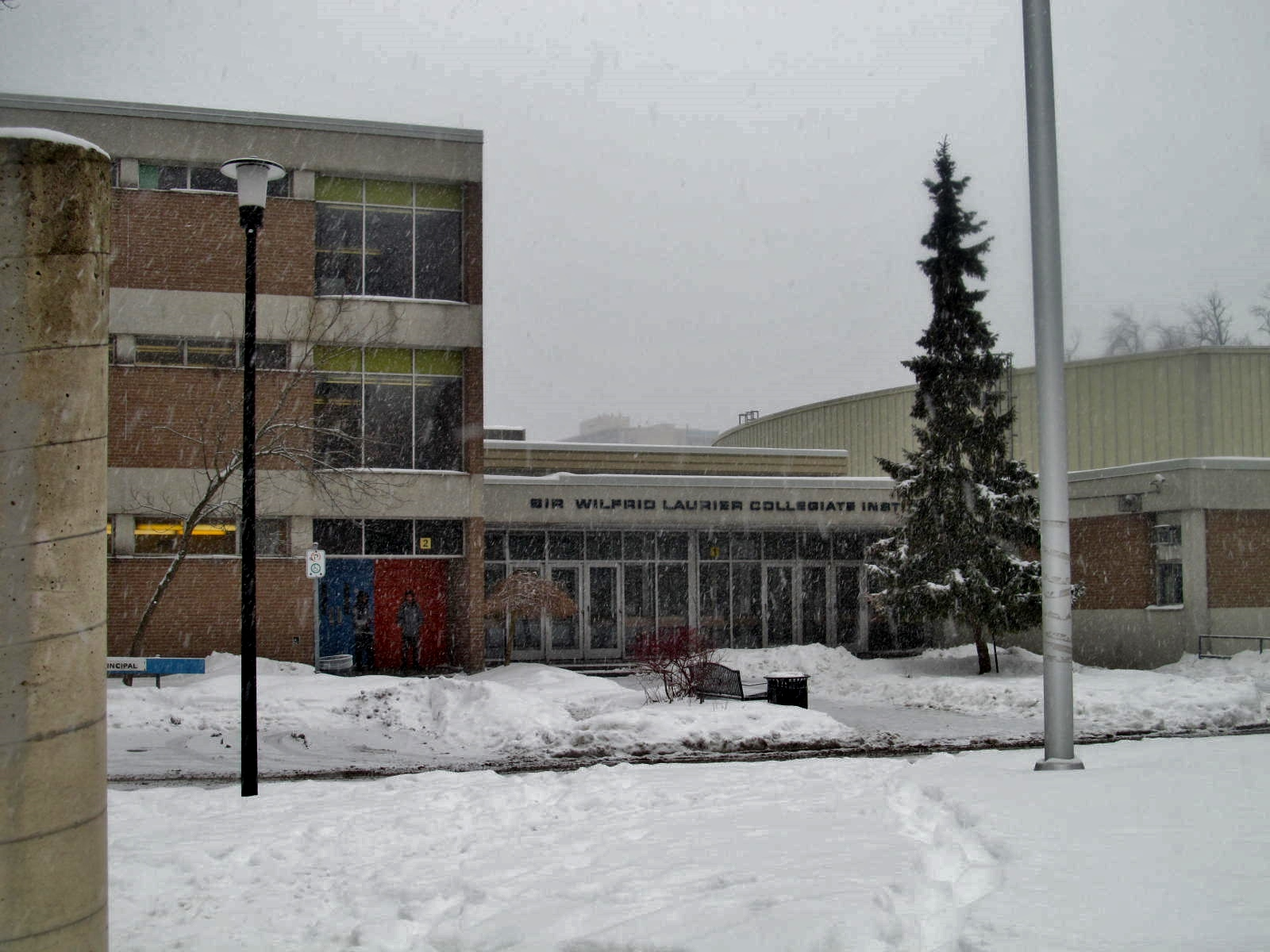
Sir Wilfrid Laurier Collegiate Institute

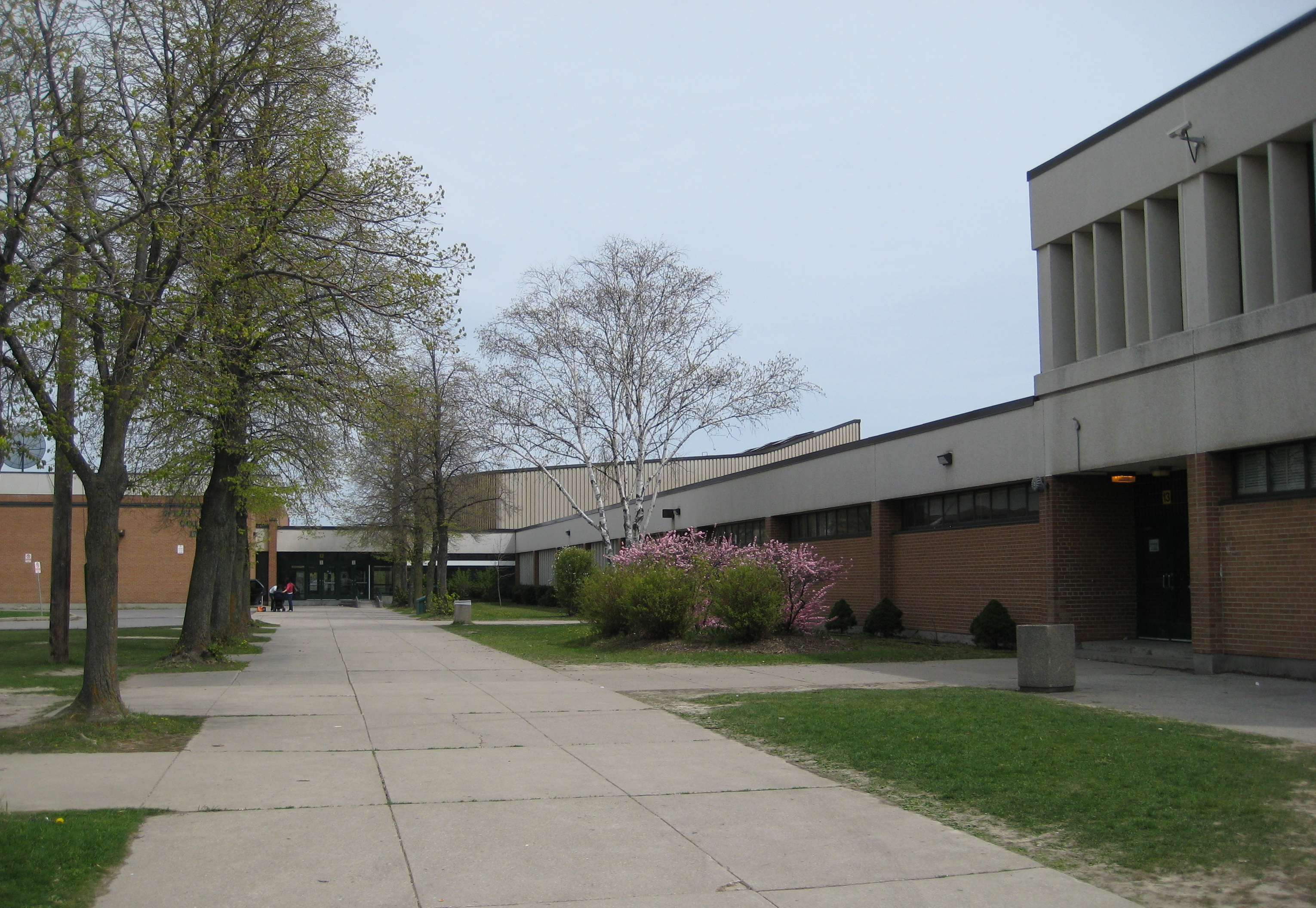
West Humber Collegiate Institute
