= Father John Redmond Catholic Secondary School and Regional Arts Centre =

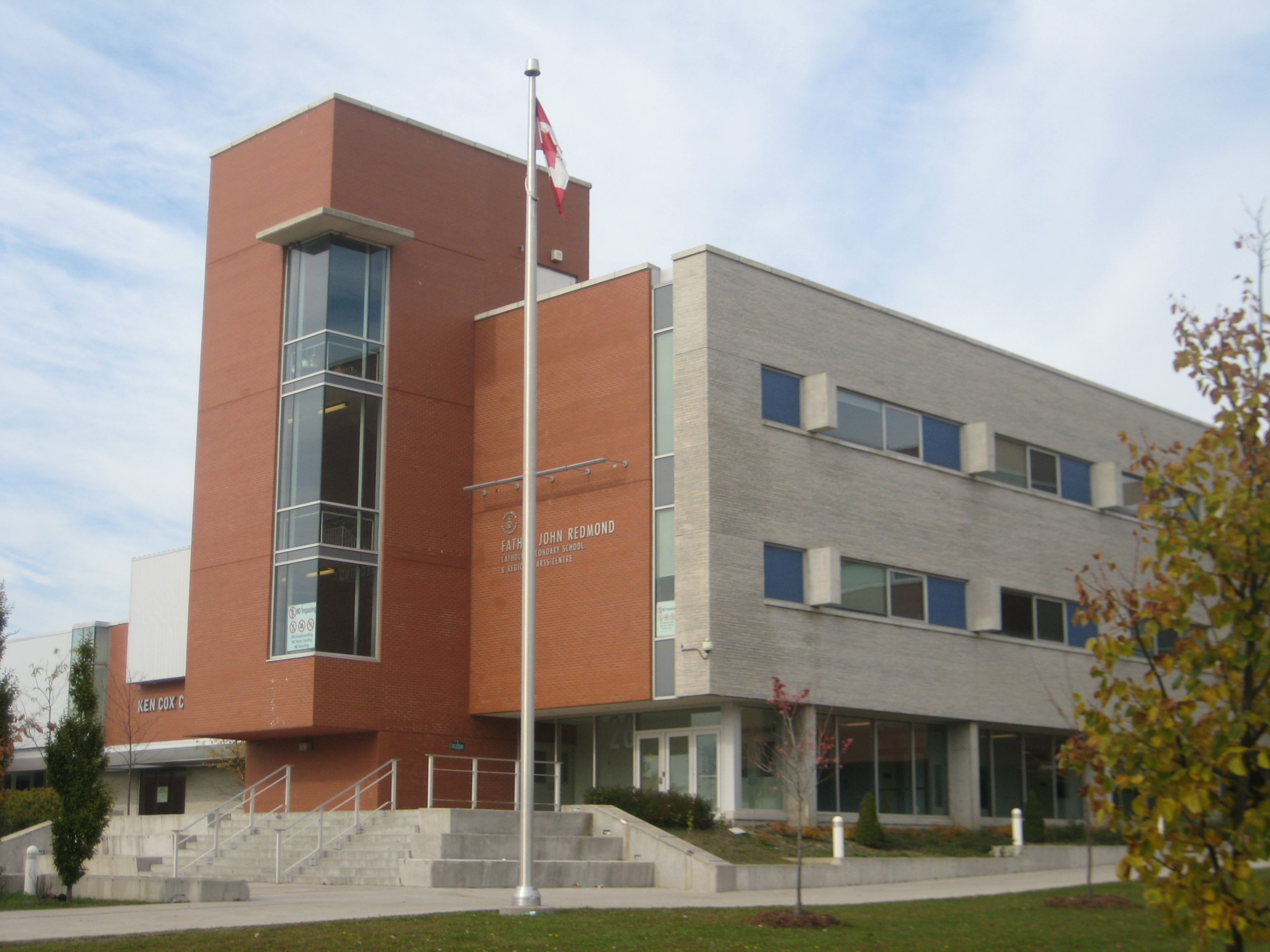

Location
- 28 Colonel Samuel Smith Park Drive; Toronto, Ontario, M8V 4B7; Canada; 43°35′40″N 79°30′59″W

Information
- Former name: Michael Power/St. Joseph High School, South Campus (1985–1986)
- School type: Catholic High school Art school
- Motto: Cursum Consumavi Fidem Servavi (I Have Finished The Race, I Have Kept The Faith)
- Religious affiliations: Roman Catholic (Basilian Fathers and Sisters of St. Joseph)
- Founded: 1985 (MPSJ Campus); 1986 (present day)
- School board: Toronto Catholic District School Board (Metropolitan Separate School Board)
- Superintendent: Adalgisio Bria; Area 2
- Area trustee: Teresa Lubinski; Ward 4
- School number: 540 / 731951
- Administrator: Maria Rebelo-Da Silva (Regional Arts Administrative Assistant)
- Principal: John D'Onofrio
- Grades: 9-12
- Enrolment: 1193 (2017-18)
- Language: English
- Schedule type: Terms (Grade 9) Semesters (Grade 10-12)
- Colours: Red, Navy and White
- Team name: Redmond Redhawks
- Parish: St. Teresa
- Specialist High Skills Major: Health and Wellness; Justice, Community Safety and Emergency Services
- Program Focus: Advanced Placement; Arts Focus; Regional Arts Program

Father John Redmond Catholic Secondary School and Regional Arts Centre (also known as Father John Redmond, Father John Redmond CSS and RAC, FJRCSS, FJR, or Redmond in short) is a Catholic high school in Toronto, Ontario, Canada. It is located in the New Toronto area of Etobicoke. It is operated by the Toronto Catholic District School Board (previously the Metropolitan Separate School Board) as a regional art school for grades 9-12.

Redmond was founded in the spring of 1985 as the south campus of Etobicoke's first Catholic high school, Michael Power/St. Joseph High School, merged in 1982 and then became a separate, standard high school in 1986. The Regional Arts Program has since started in 2006. The school was named after Father John Redmond C.S.B. (1934-September 21, 1981), a teacher, coach, educator, priest, and principal of Michael Power.

== History ==
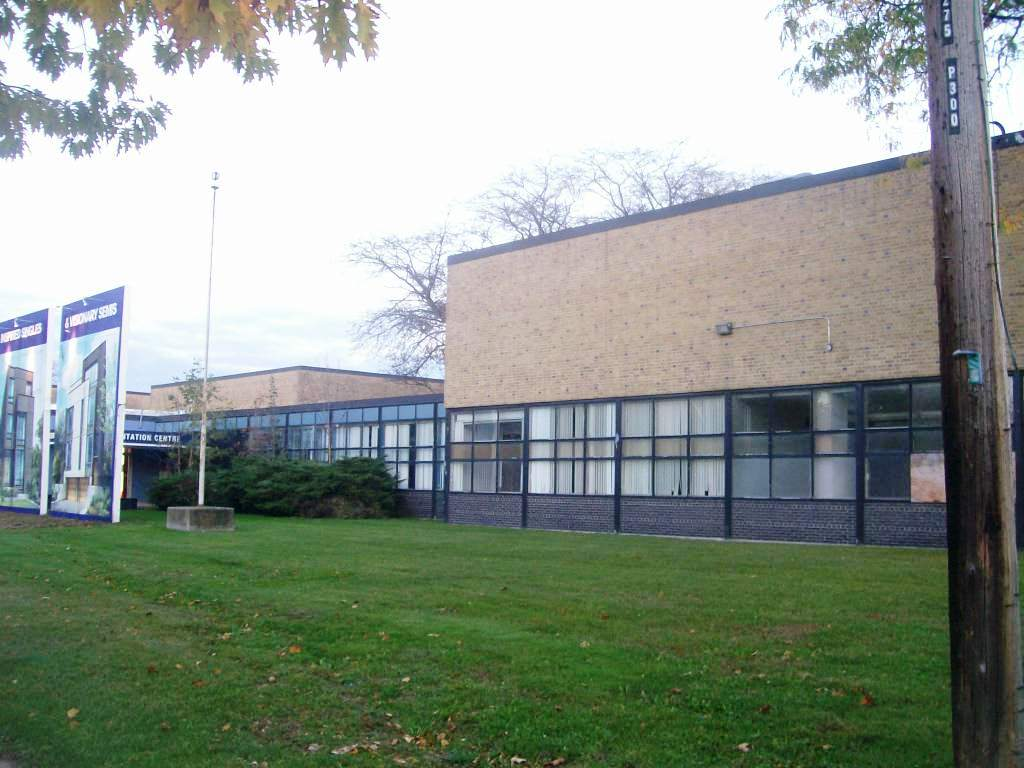
The original home of Father John Redmond from 1985 to 2006.

During a period of reorganization by public school boards across Ontario following a decision by the Ontario Government to extend funding of Catholic schools to include secondary school grades 10 to 13 (OAC) in the 1980s, many public schools of the Etobicoke Board of Education in southern Etobicoke with low enrolment were ceded to the Metropolitan Separate School Board (later the Toronto Catholic District School Board).

Originally offered the former Mimico High School (now John English Junior Middle School), the MSSB preferred the newer, designed buildings of Kingsmill Secondary School (later Bishop Allen Academy), which were already nearby, requested the former Alderwood Collegiate Institute in Alderwood (which was closed in June 1983) to serve the rest of southern Etobicoke; Alderwood reopened as the South campus outlet of Etobicoke's first Catholic high school, Michael Power/St. Joseph High School. The school's namesake, Father John Redmond was named in his honor after serving as a Basilian priest, a principal, an educator, and prominent national track and field coach. The roots clearly relied on the Basilian motto of "Teach me Goodness, Discipline and Knowledge."

The 1960s school buildings were in a very bad state of repair forced Father John Redmond to relocate to newly constructed buildings in New Toronto (St. Teresa's parish), on the Lakeshore Psychiatric Hospital grounds beside the historic 19th century buildings of the Mimico Lunatic Asylum, which are now the site of Humber Polytechnic's Lakeshore Campus, in September 2006. As the Toronto Catholic District School Board does not operate an arts school in Etobicoke, Father John Redmond was chosen as the Catholic board's Regional Arts Centre on June 12, 2005. The school serves Catholic students from the former Lakeshore Municipalities (Mimico, New Toronto, Long Branch) in southern Etobicoke.

== Notable alumni ==
- Brendan Frederick Shanahan - Former NHL player, current president of Toronto Maple Leafs
- Dave Bolland - Former NHL hockey player
- Brendan Smith - NHL hockey player
- Rory Smith - NLL lacrosse player
- Reilly Smith - NHL hockey player

== See also ==
- Education in Ontario
- List of secondary schools in Ontario
- Alderwood Collegiate Institute - The original site of Father John Redmond from 1986 to 2006.
