= New Toronto =

- Neighbourhood
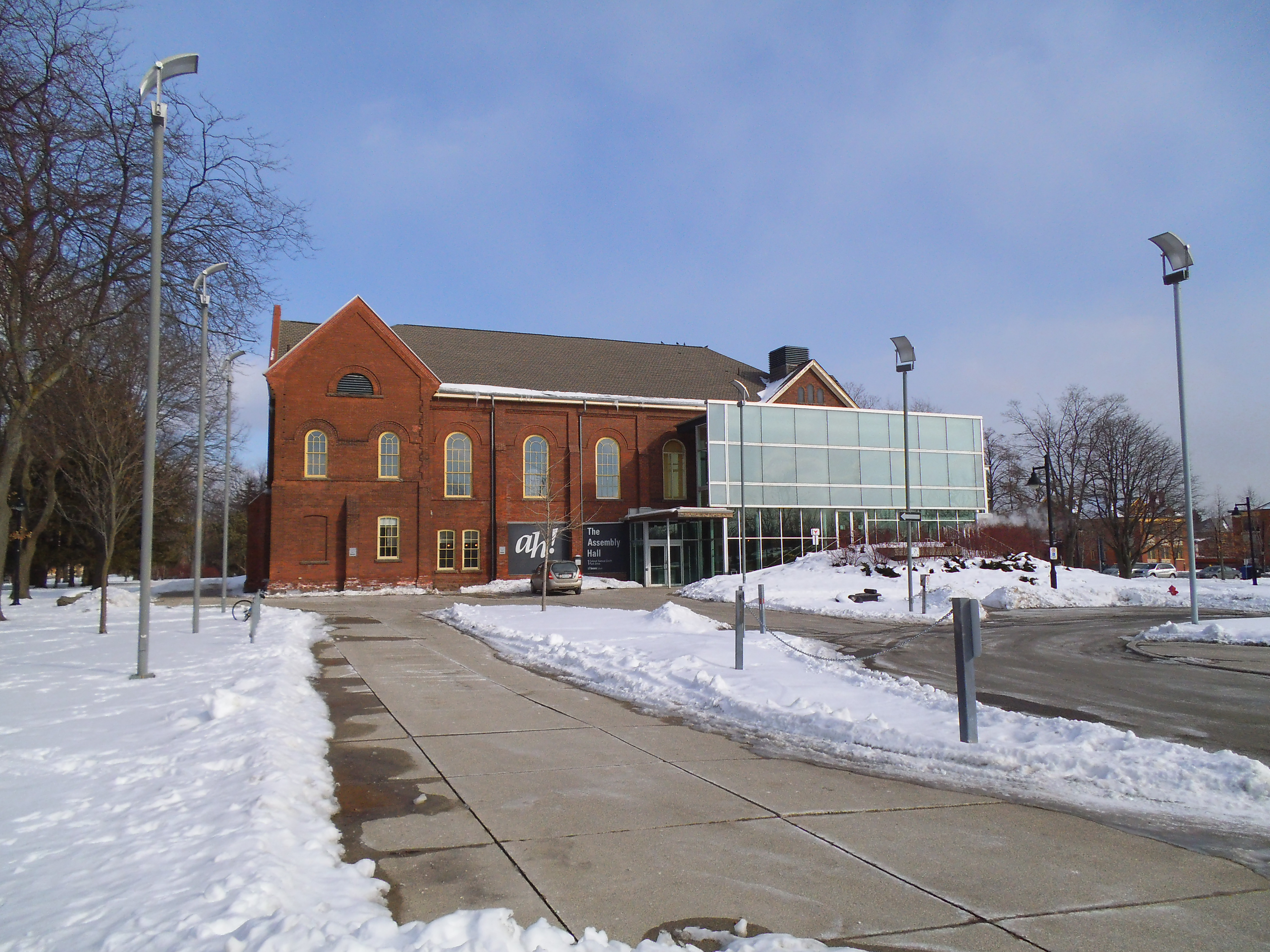
- View of Humber College's Lakeshore Campus near Lake Shore Boulevard
- Motto: Intelligence, Industry, Integrity
- Location within Toronto
- Coordinates: 43°36′02″N 79°30′19″W
- Country: Canada
- Province: Ontario
- City: Toronto
- Established: 1890 (Subdivision); 1892 (Postal village)
- Incorporated: 1913 (Village); 1920 (Town)
- Joined: 1953 Metropolitan Toronto

Government
  - MP: James Maloney (Etobicoke—Lakeshore))
  - MPP: Peter Milczyn (Etobicoke—Lakeshore)
  - Councillor: Mark Grimes (Ward 6 Etobicoke—Lakeshore)

New Toronto is a neighbourhood and former municipality in Toronto, Ontario, Canada. It is located in the south-west area of Toronto, along Lake Ontario. The Town of New Toronto was established in 1890, and was designed and planned as an industrial centre by a group of industrialists from Toronto who had visited Rochester, New York. New Toronto was originally a part of the Township of Etobicoke. It was an independent municipality from 1913 to 1967, being one of the former 'Lakeshore Municipalities' amalgamated into the Borough of Etobicoke, and eventually amalgamated into Toronto. The neighbourhood has retained the name.

== Boundaries ==
New Toronto is bounded by Lake Ontario to the south, with a western boundary of Twenty Third Street (south of Lake Shore Blvd. West) and the midpoint between Twenty-Second and Twenty-Fourth Streets (north of Lake Shore Blvd. West), the Canadian National Railway mainline to the north, and Dwight Avenue to the east. To the east is the neighbourhood of Mimico and the neighbourhood of Long Branch is to the west.

== Character ==
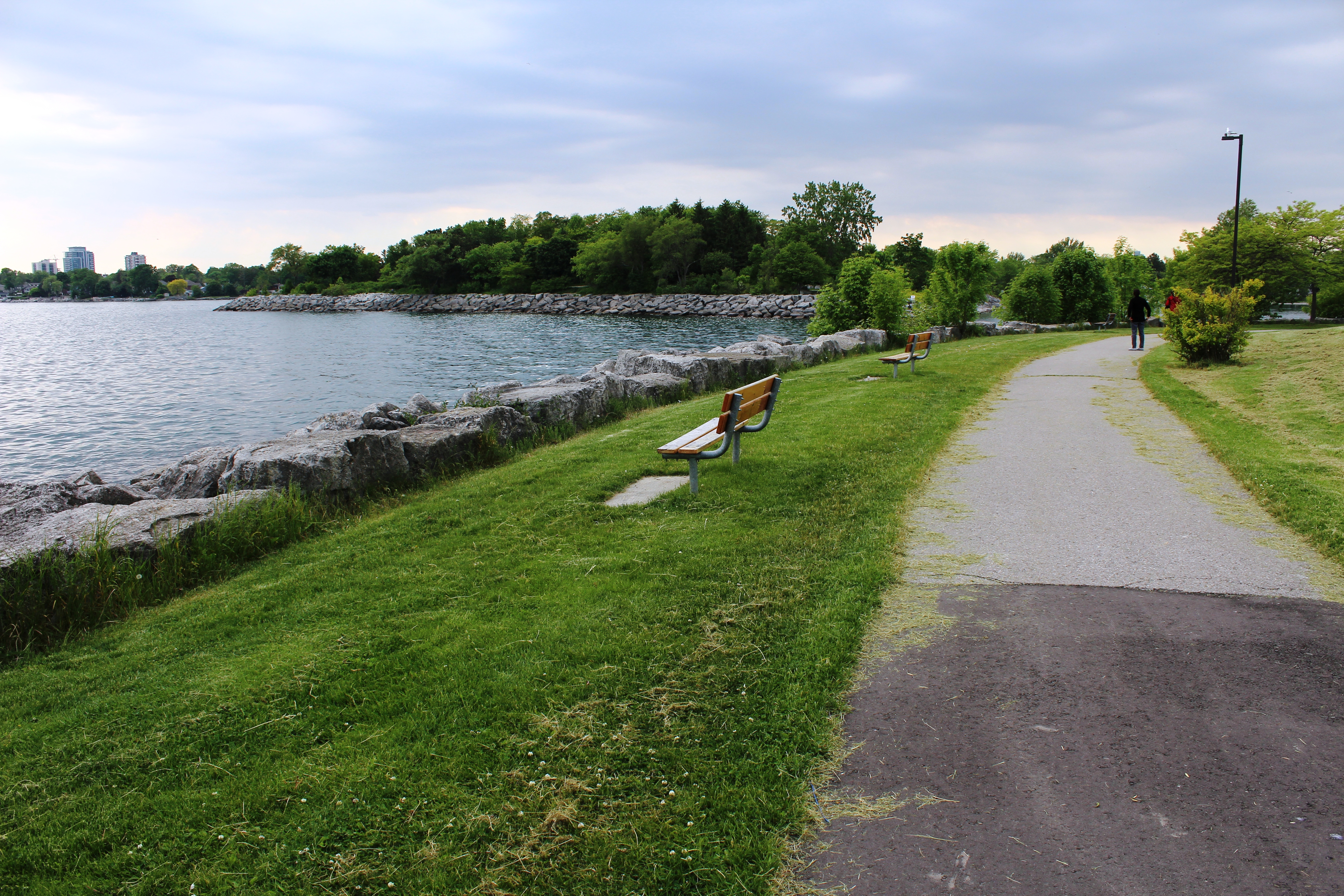
Colonel Samuel Smith Park runs along the Toronto waterfront, within the Lakeshore Grounds.

New Toronto is now centred around the intersection of Seventh Street/ Islington Avenue and Lake Shore Boulevard West with a commercial strip running east–west along the latter street. Residential streets generally run north–south from Lake Ontario north to Birmingham Street, except for the Lakeshore Grounds (formerly the Mimico Lunatic Asylum / Lakeshore Psychiatric Hospital) to the southwest which extends from Lake Shore Blvd. West south to the Lake. North of Birmingham Street has historically been a large industrial district, although many industries moved or closed in the period from 1987 to 1991.

New Toronto is now a neighbourhood in transition, as the industrial corridor located at the north end of the community is being redeveloped after having been vacant and fallow for many years. Industry that gradually moved out of New Toronto over the years is now being re-established, in addition to institutional uses.

Lakeshore Village, a community of co-operative housing between 9th and 13th Streets, north of Lake Shore Boulevard. West, was built by The Daniels Corp. developers, on the former Goodyear Tire and Rubber Company site. The loss of the former employment base resulted in a considerable downtrend in local business viability, which the lower-income housing could never replace.

In September 2009, the new Toronto Police College training facility opened at 70 Birmingham St., and also houses a 22 Division Police Substation. This is the site of the former Continental Can Company of Canada Ltd. New Toronto Plant.

In 1890, new streets for the Town of New Toronto were laid out in several series, essentially without names by simply using ordinal numbers (First, Second, Third, etc.). When the streets were laid out along Lake Shore Road (now Lake Shore Blvd. West), they had a single new starting point. The second numbering system began with First Street being one half-block west of Dwight Ave (the boundary street between the Town of Mimico and New Toronto) and continuing westward. Originally named "Mimico Avenue", and for most of the 20th century as "Eighteenth Street" (officially, until the 1980s), Kipling Avenue is the westernmost north–south major road. The street-number naming convention was later applied to streets further west of New Toronto in the Village of Long Branch when their streets were renamed in 1931.

== History ==
=== Establishment ===
The largest farming families in what would become New Toronto were the Northcote family to the east (south of Lake Shore Blvd. West at Seventh Street/Islington Avenue today), and the Goldthorpe family to the west at Mimico Avenue (now Kipling Avenue), where the Mimico Lunatic Asylum was later built.

In the 1880s, the Goldthorpe farm south of the Lake Shore Road Lake Shore Boulevard West and east of Mimico Avenue was purchased by the Ontario Government. In 1888, it became the location of the Mimico Lunatic Asylum (later known as the Lakeshore Psychiatric Hospital.) It was built to alleviate overcrowding at Toronto's Asylum on Queen Street West (later known as Queen Street Mental Health Centre, and now the Centre for Addiction and Mental Health).

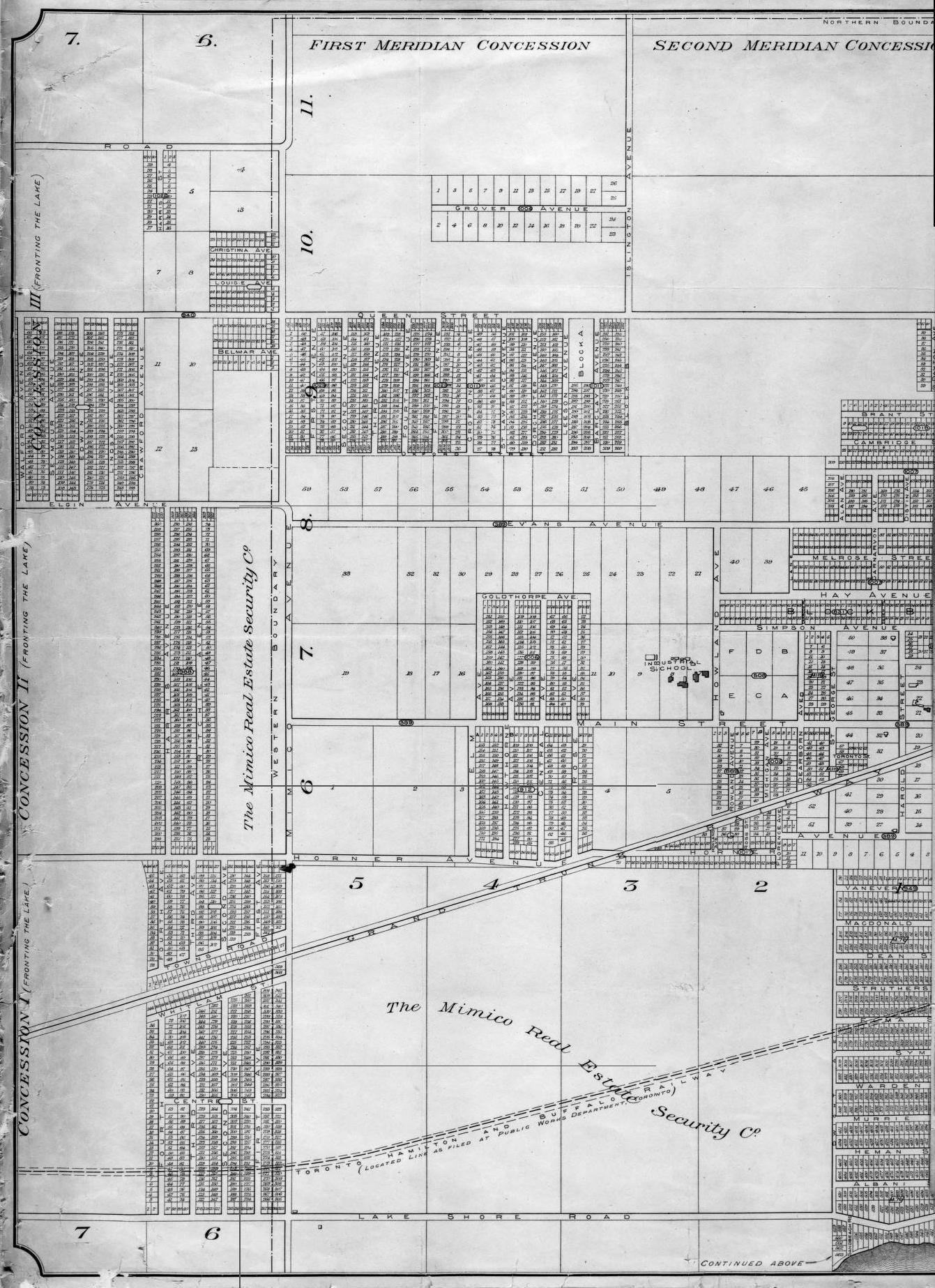
Plans for the subdivision that later developed into New Toronto, 1890.

In 1890, a plan of subdivision was filed by a group of industrialists and the first streets laid out for the Town of New Toronto by the Mimico Real Estate Security Company. With the first industries in New Toronto already operating, or to be operational by the end of 1890, New Toronto was promoted with the publication of an article in the edition of October 25, 1890 of the Toronto Globe newspaper (now the Globe & Mail) entitled "Toronto's Growing Suburb – New Toronto – As it is and what it will be". New Toronto, as an industrial centre "was expected to rival – if not exceed – 'old' Toronto in manufacturing output". A few worker's homes were built on early streets north of Lake Shore Road while development proceeded.

New Toronto was planned and designed as a "town", with manufacturing as its focal point, but also including retail business and residential areas in the plan. The Town of New Toronto would become a fully independent, self-sufficient municipality.

John Sheane's Hotel (later, The New Toronto Hotel and the Almont Hotel) was located across from the Asylum grounds at Mimico Avenue (Kipling Ave.) and the Lake Shore Road (now Lake Shore Blvd West). In 1892, a post office was established in New Toronto. The next year, the pastor of Mimico's Methodist Church began holding separate services in New Toronto, establishing a church building as a branch of Mimico's new Methodist Circuit in 1909.

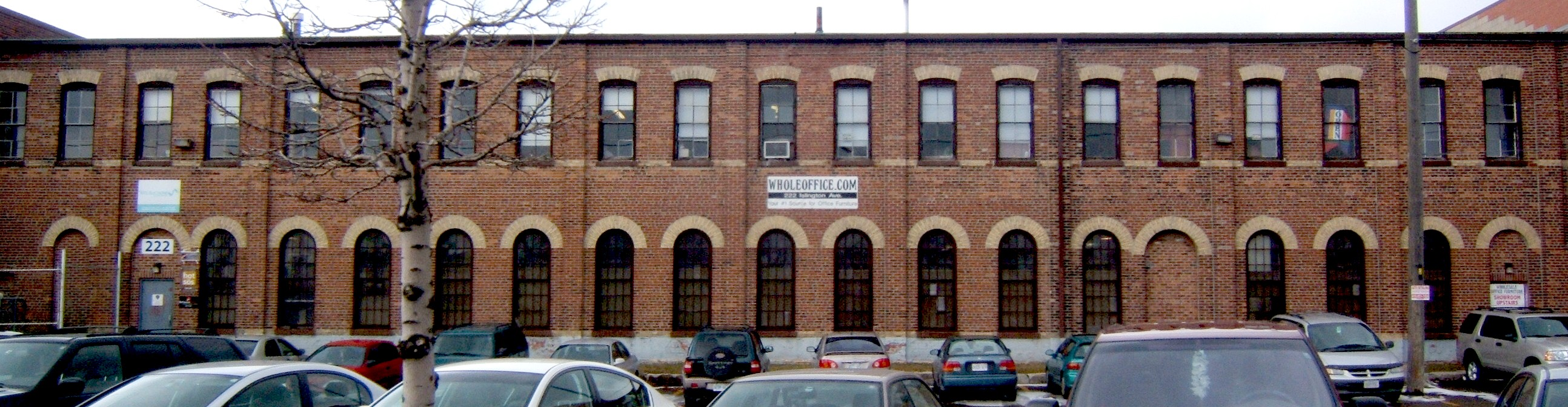
Victorian-era industrial buildings in New Toronto. The area was primarily industrial developments at the beginning of the 20th century.

The Mimico Yard (the former Grand Trunk Railway freight yard) was established in 1906, encouraging many more industries to relocate to New Toronto. The same year a public school was established on Sixth Street. A proper school house was opened in 1909 on Fifth Street (Fifth Street Public School). By 1911, an Anglican church had been completed in New Toronto called St. Margaret's.

While some early factory housing was built on Sixth Street, and later Fifth Street, little residential development in New Toronto took place until after World War I. Farming was still prevalent south of the Lake Shore Road. Although some realtors began to advertise subdivisions for housing around 1910, it still took at least a decade until a sufficient base of local retail stores existed to support a permanent local population.

=== Town of New Toronto (1913–1967) ===
Federal census population history of New Toronto
| Year | Pop. | ±% |
|---|---|---|
| 1901 | 209 | — |
| 1911 | 686 | +228.2% |
| 1921 | 2,669 | +289.1% |
| 1931 | 7,146 | +167.7% |
| 1941 | 9,504 | +33.0% |
| 1951 | 11,194 | +17.8% |
| 1956 | 11,560 | +3.3% |
| 1961 | 13,384 | +15.8% |
| 1966 | 13,234 | −1.1% |
Source: Statistics Canada

In 1913, New Toronto was incorporated as a separate village, with a population of 500. In 1915 the Methodist church became a separate Methodist Parish from Mimico. 1916 saw a referendum on joining New Toronto to Mimico which passed in Mimico but was defeated by New Toronto residents.

With the First World War raging, new industries arrived in New Toronto - most notably Goodyear Tire and Rubber Company established a plant in 1916-17 which quickly became the town's largest employer. Other major industries included: E.I. du Pont de Nemours and Company 'Fabrikoid' plant (1915, later renamed as "Canadian Industries Limited"), Anaconda American Brass Company of Canada (1922, after taking over the operations of Browns Copper & Brass Rolling Mills Ltd., 1915), Campbell Soup Co. of Canada (1930), W & A Gilbey Ltd. distillery (1933), and the Continental Can Company of Canada Ltd. (1936).

In 1919 Loblaws introduced their "self-shopping" concept with the first Loblaw Groceteria at 2879 Lake Shore Boulevard West in New Toronto.

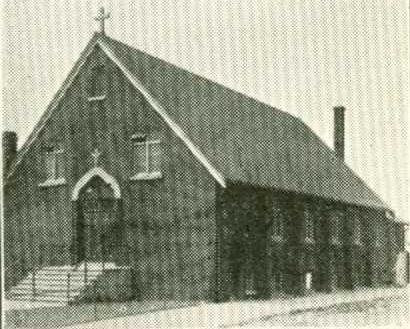
St. Teresa Catholic Church in 1937. The church was established in New Toronto in 1924.

New Toronto became a fully independent municipality (town) in 1920 and established a Library Association. In 1924 a St. Teresa's Catholic Church was created in New Toronto out of Mimico's St. Leo's Catholic Church.

By 1927 a new school was needed and Seventh Street Public school was opened.

With the creation of the United Church of Canada after the union of the Methodist, Congregational and Presbyterian Churches, the New Toronto Methodist Church opened a new church building, the first to be built specifically as a United Church, called the Century United Church.

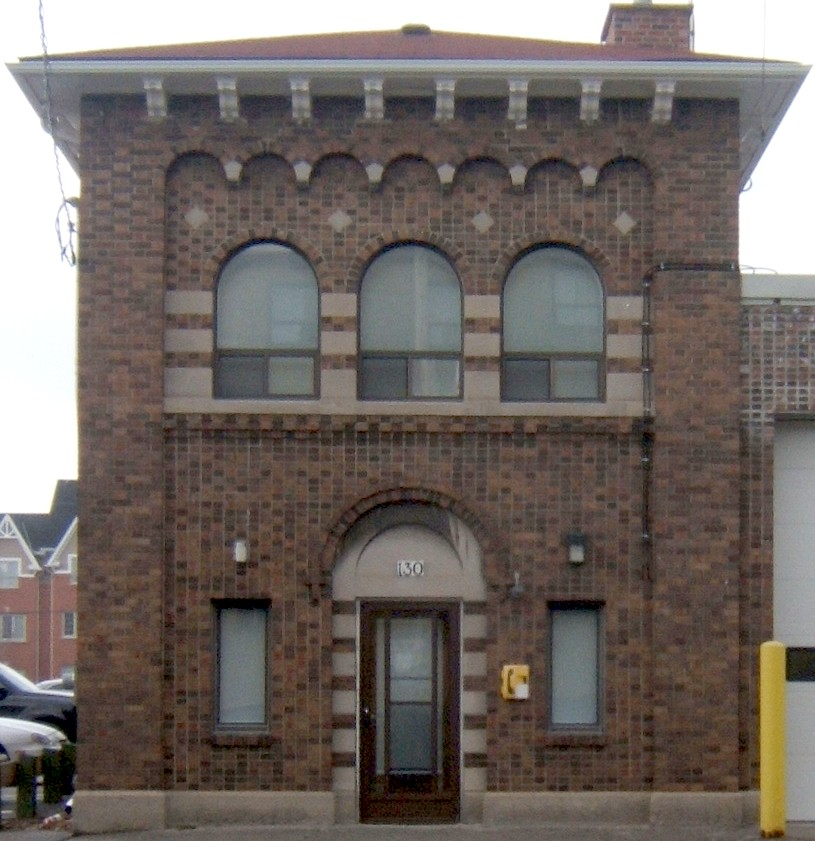
The New Toronto fire station was built in 1929, and is still used by Toronto Fire Services.

In 1929, the New Toronto fire station was built. Designed in an Italianate style, it was also used as the Town Hall for a time. It is still a fire station today. At the same time, the new mayor William Jackson donated land for a Public Library Building. Jackson would go on to be mayor almost continuously until 1952. In 1930, the Campbell Soup Company Ltd. had arrived in New Toronto commissioning architects Mathers and Holdenby to build an Art Deco factory at 60 Birmingham Street (c. 1931). In 1947 the Fifth Street Public School burned down and was replaced with the new Second Street Public School. The former Fifth St. Public School was then rebuilt to become the Town of New Toronto Town Hall.

Because of New Toronto's large industrial base, a new high school was needed to educate and train future workers for industry. In 1951, New Toronto Secondary School (NTSS) was opened. The curriculum of NTSS focused on the sciences and skilled trades (i.e. calculus, functions, geometry, physics, biology, auto mechanics, woodworking, machine shop, electrical shops; to name some of the major study areas).

In 1953 the Town of Mimico, Town of New Toronto, Village of Long Branch, Etobicoke Township, Village of Swansea, Village of Forest Hill, Town of Weston, Town of Leaside, East York Township, North York Township, York Township, Scarborough Township and City of Toronto joined together to create a new common level of government: Metropolitan Toronto (Metro). Each municipality retained its own town council and government, but several infrastructure departments were transferred to Metro. This lasted until 1967, when the number of municipalities in Metro was reduced.

In New Toronto, to serve the large local population of Ukrainians who had settled in the area over the years, St. Michael's Ukrainian Catholic Church was built in 1954 on Sixth Street (just north of St. Margaret's Anglican Church). While many Ukrainian and Polish immigrants lived in New Toronto and surrounding communities beginning early in the 20th century, more arrived after the Communist Bloc collapsed in 1989.

Growing freight traffic in the Toronto area necessitated the creation of an amalgamated facility and a by-pass of the congested Toronto Terminal downtown. In 1965, a new rail freight facility, first named Toronto Yard and then MacMillan Yard, was opened north of Metro Toronto. The local Mimico Railway Yard was downgraded considerably, resulting in the dislocation of much railway employment. At the same time the Toronto By-Pass line allowed for the creation of GO Transit commuter service between Oakville and Pickering. GO named its facility Willowbrook, after the nearby Willowbrook Road. Old CNR facilities in Mimico Yard were used for the startup of this trial train service. Its subsequent growth has resulted in new facilities being built for GO. In 1985, Via Rail facilities at Spadina Avenue were relocated from downtown Toronto to New Toronto's underused former Mimico Yards at the newly completed Toronto Maintenance Centre (which would have its major operations moved to Quebec just a few years later).

=== Post-annexation (1967–present) ===
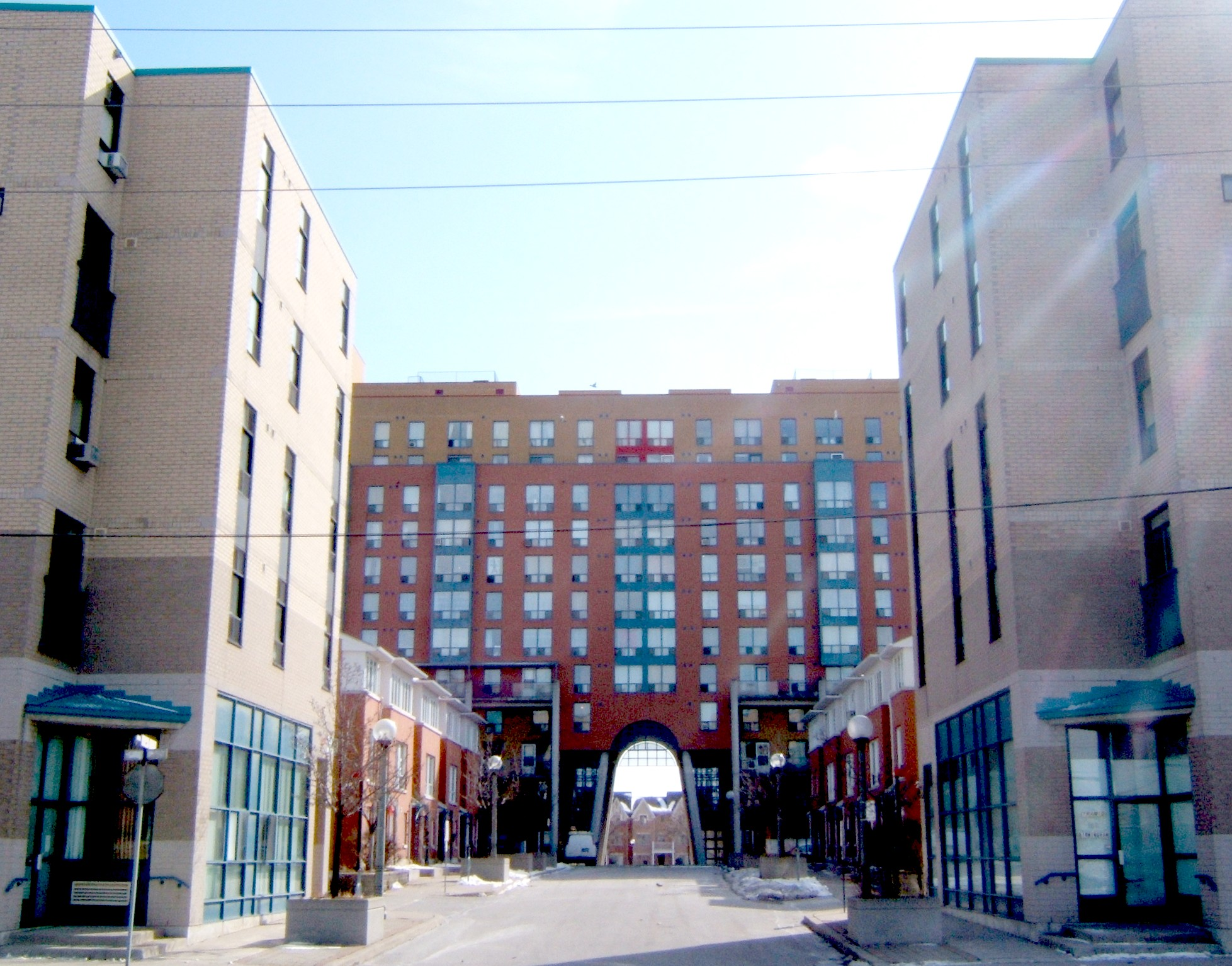
View of residential developments in the former Goodyear Canada site. The property was redeveloped into a residential area after the company closed its operations in New Toronto.

In 1967, the Town of New Toronto was amalgamated with the other Lake Shore municipalities (Town of Mimico and Village of Long Branch) with Etobicoke to create the new Borough of Etobicoke. Etobicoke later became a city in 1984. In 1998, Etobicoke was amalgamated with the other municipalities of Metropolitan Toronto to form the current City of Toronto.

An upheaval came in May 1987. Goodyear Canada Inc., which was the largest employer in New Toronto, shut down its plant contributing to a general loss of employment in the area. The lands are now the site of several co-operative housing buildings, townhouses, condos, and a park. New Toronto's library branch was demolished in 1993 to be replaced with a new building.

Recent attempts to rejuvenate New Toronto include the protection of remaining industrial lands for employment. The former Mimico Lunatic Asylum buildings and grounds became the new site of Humber College's Lake Shore campus. The new Lakeshore Lions Arena was constructed on the former W & A Gilbey distillery site.

== Education ==
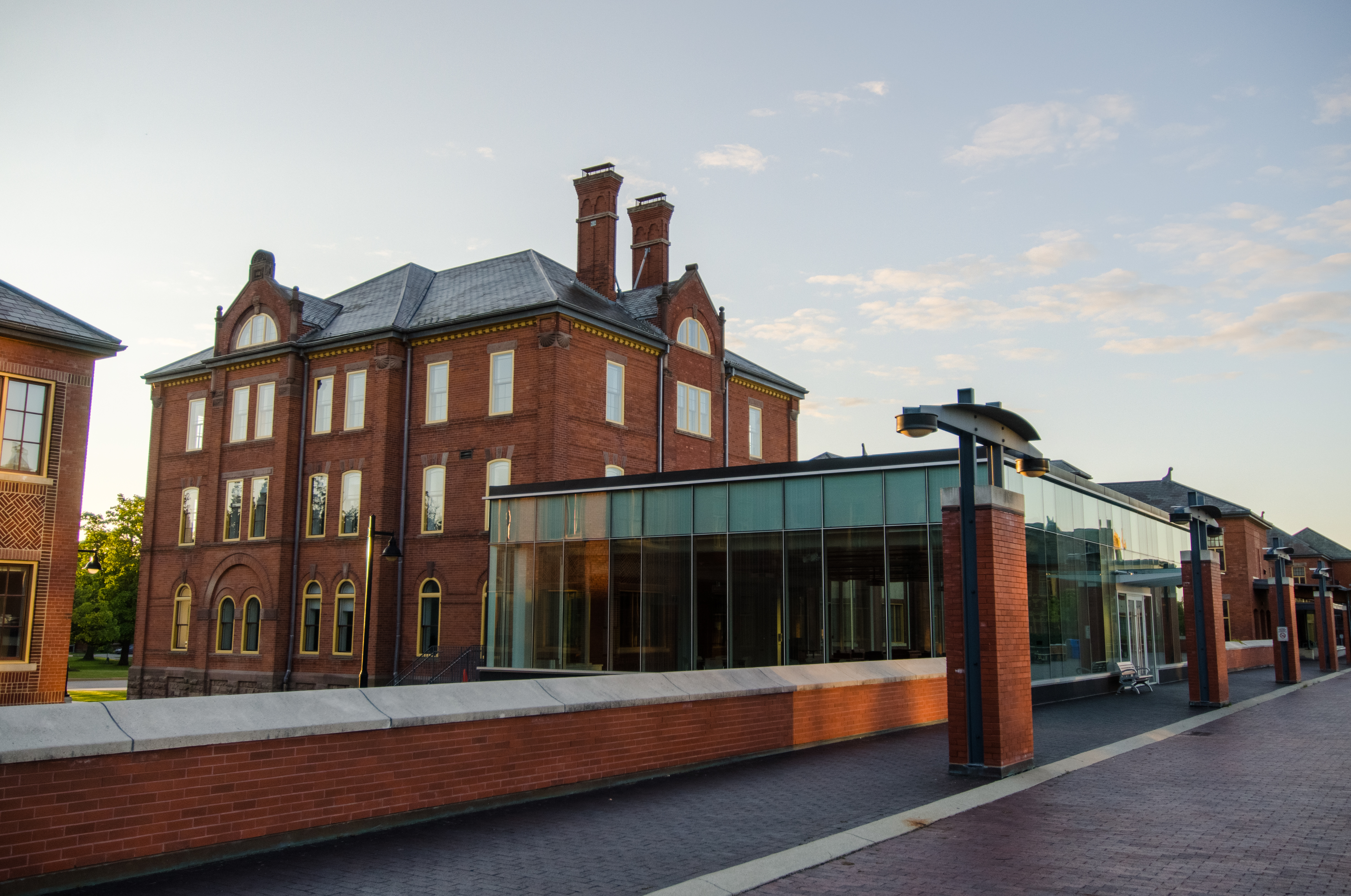
Building G at Humber College's Lakeshore Campus in New Toronto.

New Toronto is also home to Humber College's Lakeshore campus. The college is a public post-secondary institution. The Lakeshore Campus is located on the former grounds of the Mimico Lunatic Asylum (later renamed the Lakeshore Psychiatric Hospital), at the foot of Kipling Avenue (originally Eighteenth Street).

In addition to post-secondary schooling, two public school boards operate institutions within New Toronto, the Toronto District School Board (TDSB), and the Toronto Catholic District School Board (TCDSB). Both school boards provide primary and secondary schooling.

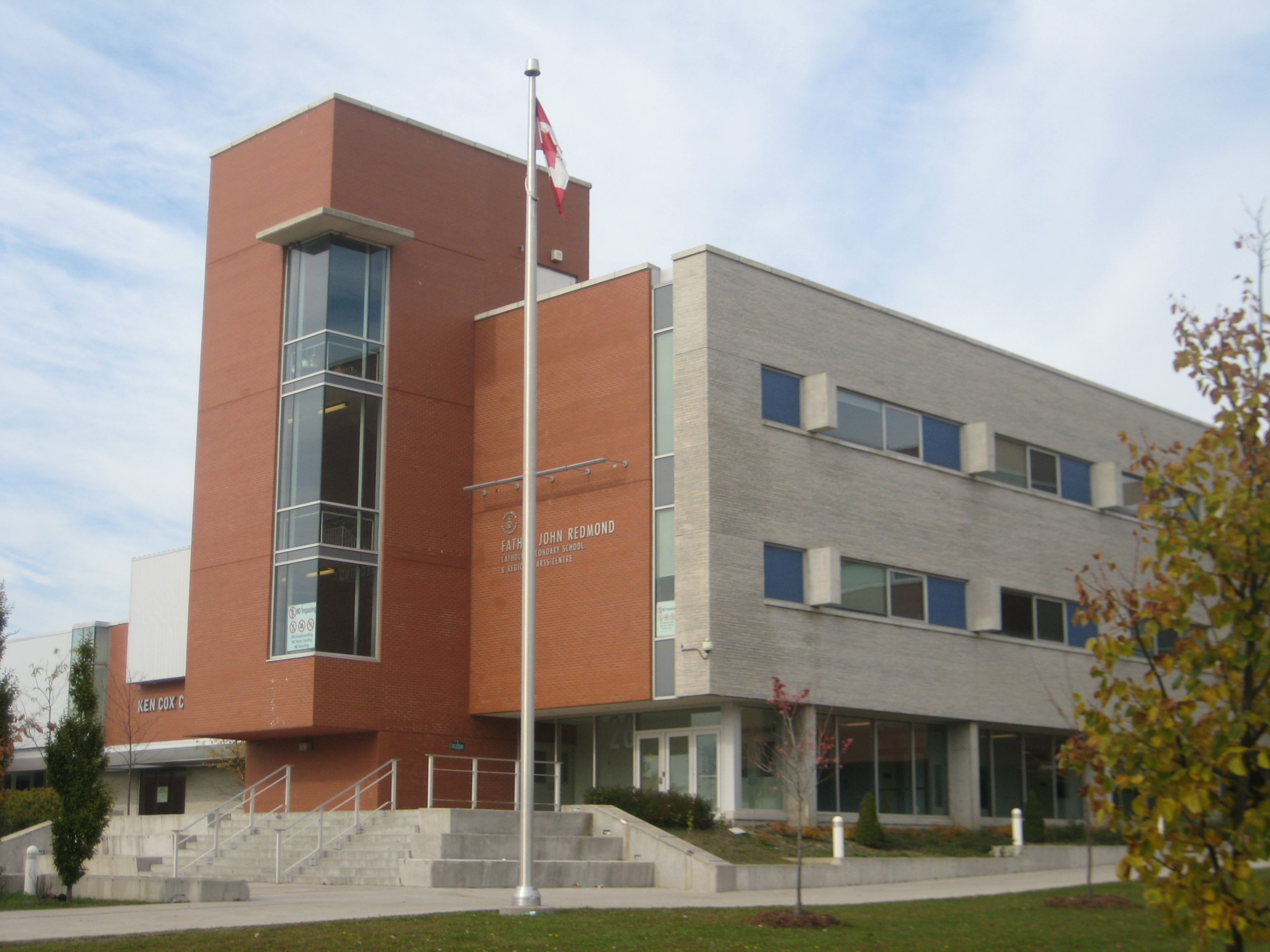
Father John Redmond Catholic Secondary School and Regional Arts Centre is a major public separate secondary school serving this neighbourhood.

TDSB is a secular public school board for the city, and operates one secondary school in the neighbourhood, Lakeshore Collegiate Institute, originally New Toronto Secondary School. The secondary school opened in 1951. Its purpose was to provide technical education to students who would either go on to university or enter the skilled trades, as the school's focus was on technical shops and science education, whereas Mimico High School was business-oriented. The Lakeshore district experienced a constant heightened demand for skilled trades due to the numerous major industries and supporting businesses located there. New Toronto Secondary School was expanded in 1965 to accommodate a growing student population. The school merged with Alderwood Collegiate Institute to form Lakeshore Collegiate Institute in 1983, due to falling public school enrollment when the Province extended public funding to Catholic high schools. New Toronto's building was designed by architect John B. Parkin.

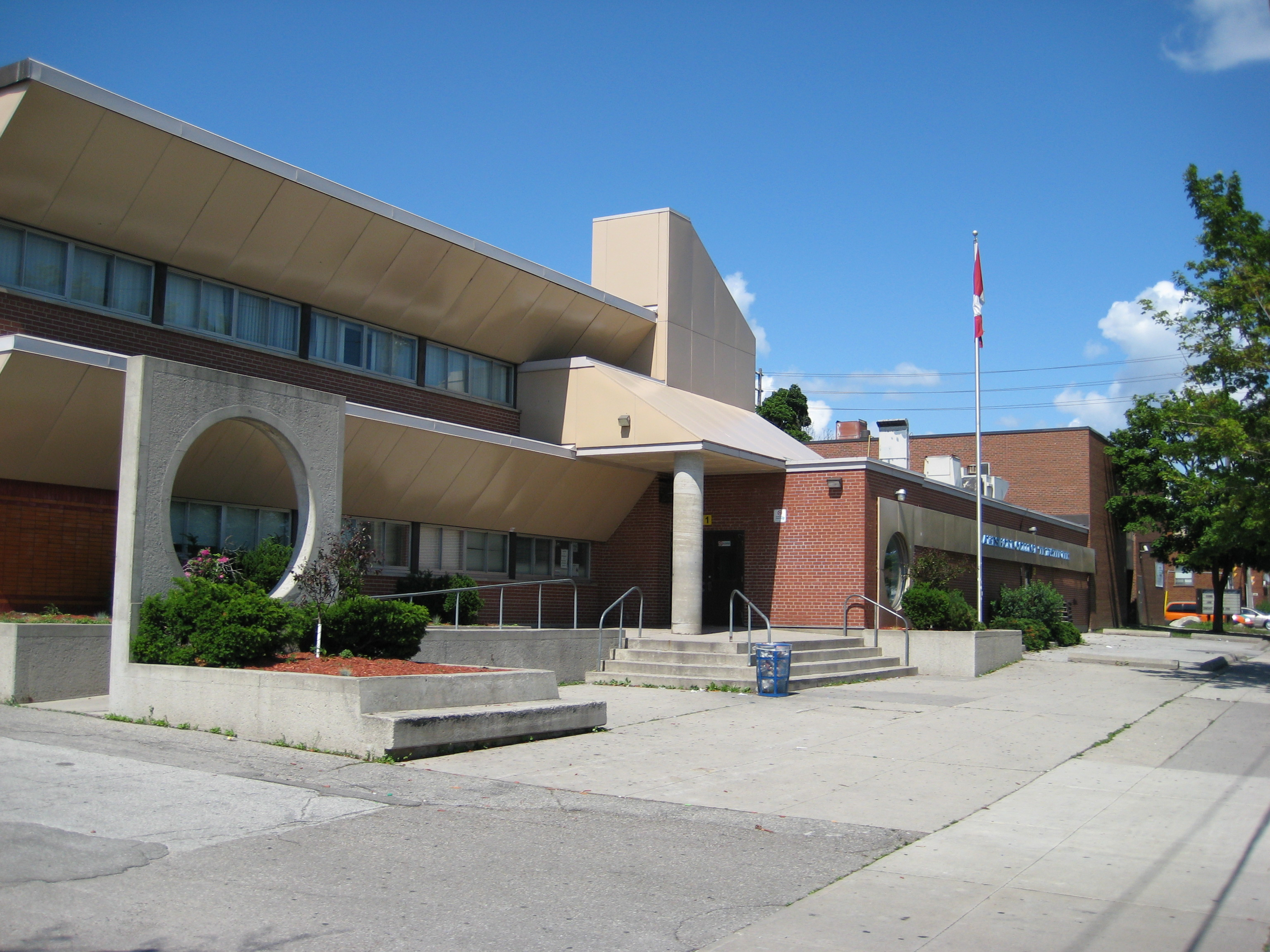
Lakeshore Collegiate Institute is a public secondary school located in the neighbourhood.

TDSB operates several elementary and middle schools in New Toronto. They include:

- Second Street Junior Middle School is a public elementary school located a few blocks east of the intersection of Seventh Street/ Lake Shore Boulevard West and Islington Avenue. The original school was built in 1949 and a large second storey wheelchair accessible addition was built in 1996 where the previous single-storey wing existed. The school was built because Fifth Street School had burnt down and the students needed a new school. The Fifth Street School became the New Toronto Town Hall, then Metro Police 21 Division station, and then became the Lakeshore Area Multiservices Project (LAMP) in 1973. The City of Toronto is the owner of the building now.
- Seventh Street Junior School is a public elementary school on Seventh Street. The original school opened in 1922. In 1989, a new school was built on the school yard and the old building was then demolished.
- Twentieth Street Junior School is a public elementary school on the corner of Lake Shore Boulevard and Twentieth Street. There has been a school on this site serving the New Toronto community since 1920. In 1993, the original building and its additions were demolished and a new structure was constructed which opened in September 1994. The school is fully accessible and is close to a host of community recreation facilities such as Lakeshore Lions Arena and Gus Ryder Pool. Twentieth Street Junior School is a short walk from Lake Ontario.

TCDSB is a public separate school board for the city, and operates one elementary school in the neighbourhood, St. Teresa Catholic Elementary School. Located on Tenth Street. Prior to its establishment, children attending Catholic schools went to Christ the King Catholic School or St. Leo Catholic Elementary School. St. Teresa's school was established in 1957 during a post war population boom in the, then independent, Town of New Toronto, including many families from predominantly Catholic countries, especially Poland.

== Demographics ==
In 2016, the New Toronto neighbourhood was home to 11,463 residents. 66% of the population speak English as their first language, 5.2% speak Polish, 2.9% speak Tagalog and 2.5% speak Spanish.

Major ethnic populations (2016):

- 66% White; 17.6% British, 15.4% Irish, 15.4% Scottish, 9.6% Polish
- 11% Black; 3.7% Jamaican
- 5.1% South Asian; 4.4% Indian
- 3.5% Filipino

== Institutions ==
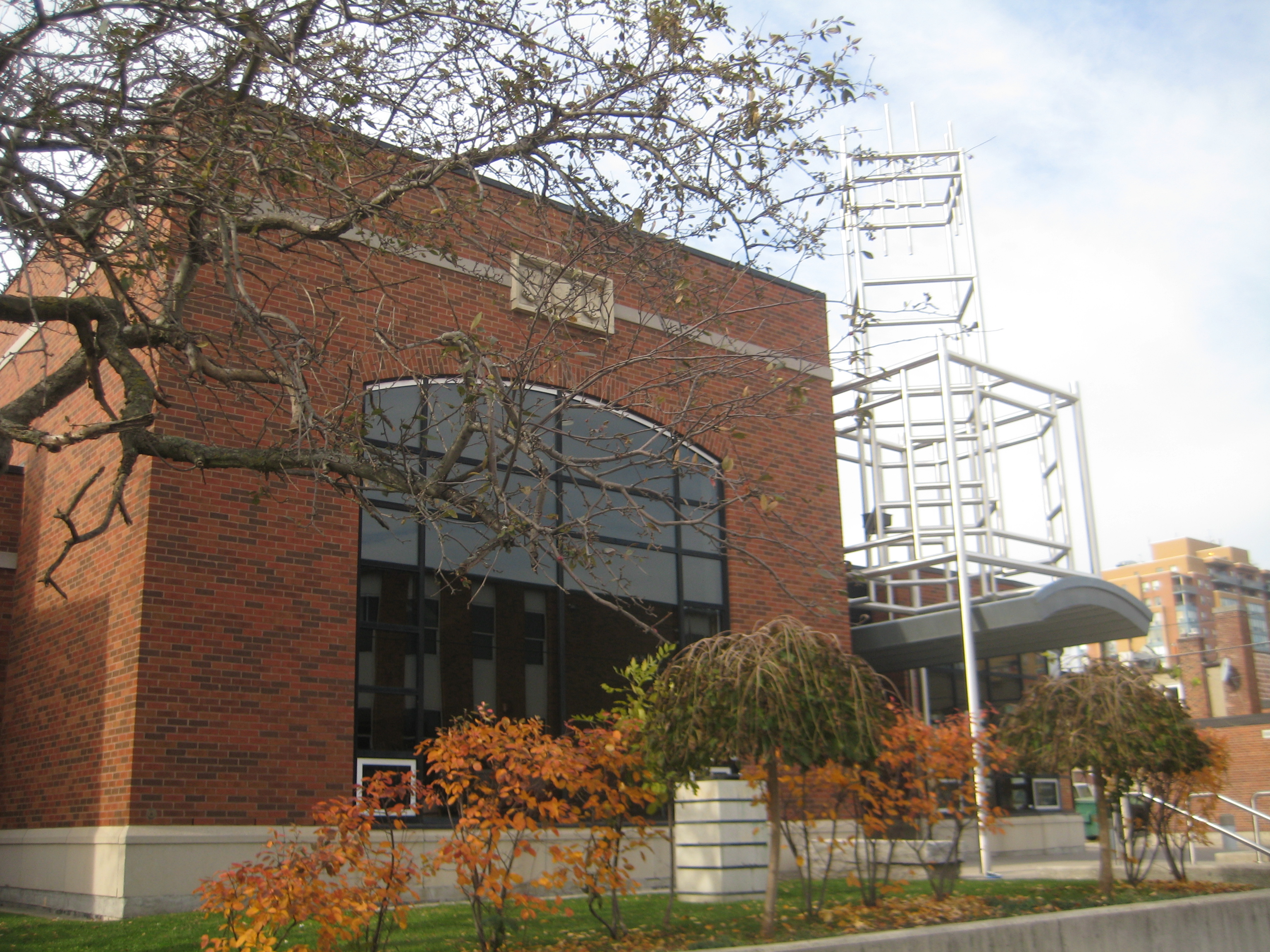
The New Toronto branch of the Toronto Public Library operates within the neighbourhood.

- New Toronto Town Hall (now LAMP)
- New Toronto Post Office
- New Toronto Fire Hall, 130 Eighth St
- New Toronto Library
- Almont Hotel
- Winston Spencer Churchill Legion Hall
- Mimico Railway Yards
- Lakeshore Lions Arena

New Toronto always had a large industrial base including plants operated by: Ritchie and Ramsay Co. paper mills, Anaconda American Brass Ltd., Canadian Industries Ltd., Goodyear Tire and Rubber Co. Ltd., Plibrico, Charis Ltd., W & A Gilbey Ltd., Continental Can Company of Canada Ltd. (all demolished), as well as the Campbell Soup Company of Canada Ltd. and Dominion Colour Corporation Ltd. (surviving), McDonald Stamping Works/Robert Menzie Wallpaper Co./Reg. N. Boxer Co./Canadian Wallpaper Manufacturers Ltd., Mel-O-Ripe Bananas (buildings survive).

=== Churches ===
- St. Margaret Anglican Church (est. 1906)
- St. Teresa Roman Catholic Church (est. 1924)
- St. Michaels Ukrainian Catholic Church (est. 1954)
- Living Hope Baptist Church
- New Covenant Pentecostal Church
- Bosnian Mosque, former site of Century United Church

== Transportation ==
The Toronto Transit Commission's 501 Queen streetcar line, which runs along Lake Shore Boulevard, connects New Toronto to the downtown core. Though Mimico GO Station is nearby and GO Transit trains use track in the northern reaches of the neighbourhood, there is no active railway station in New Toronto. Four TTC bus lines serve the area. The 44 Kipling South, the 110 Islington South and the 944 Kipling South Express routes connect to the Bloor-Danforth subway to the north.

== Notable people ==
=== Mayors ===
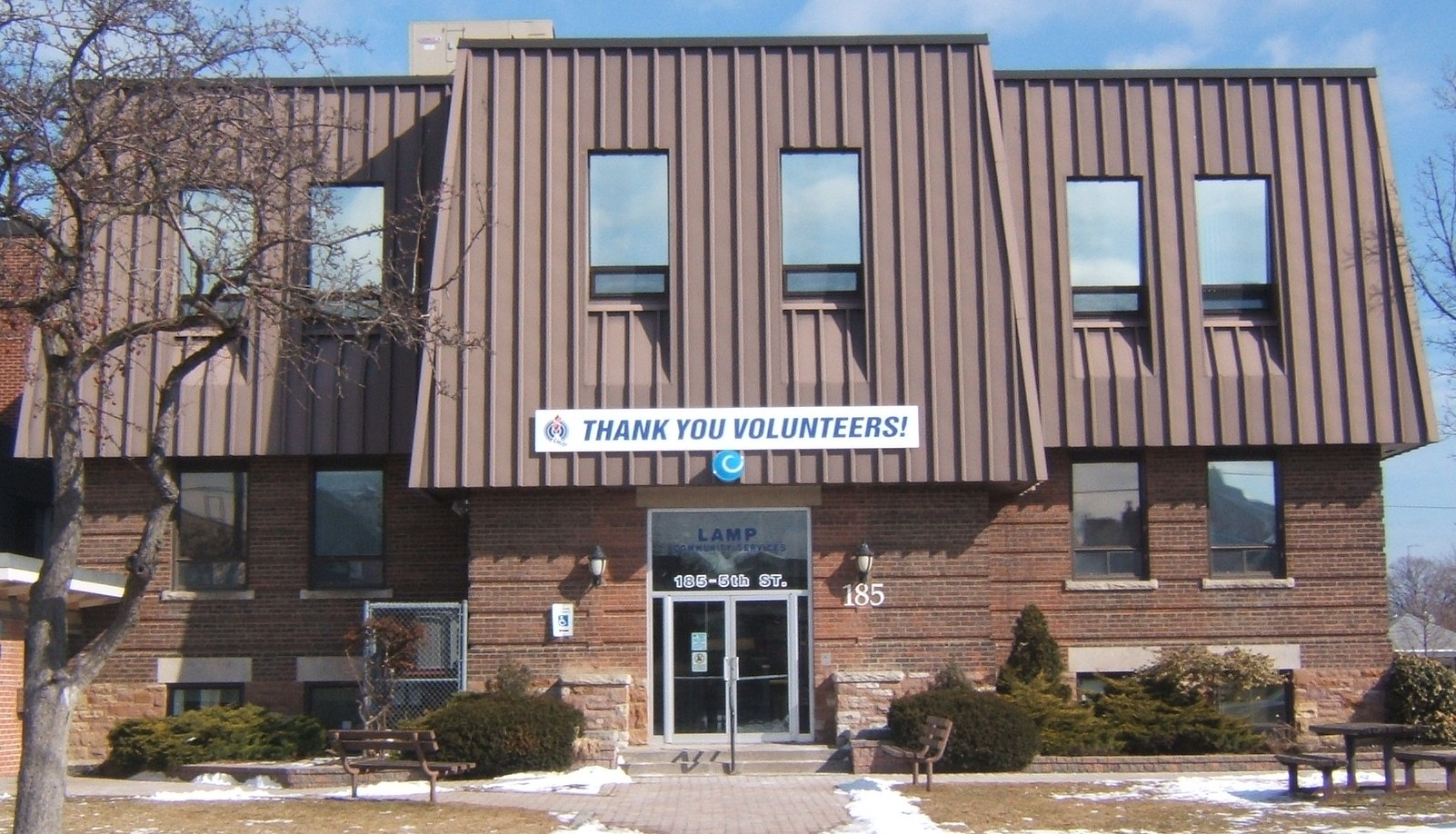
The building that housed the former New Toronto Town Hall.

The position of Mayor of the Town of New Toronto was created in 1920. The town also retained the position of reeve, as the municipality's second ranking position, until 1954 and had a deputy reeve from 1921 to 1953.

Mayors of New Toronto include:

- George Ironside (1913–1917) (Reeve)
- Charles Lovejoy (1917–1922) Mayor from 1920
- S. Tucker (1922)
- George Janes (1923–1926)
- George Warner (1926–1929)
- William G.W. Jackson (1929–1937, 1938–1952) - Farmer and land speculator, previously Reeve of Etobicoke (1919-1920), died in office
- S.B. Douglas (1937)
- E.W. Grant (1952–1954) - lawyer by profession
- John L. (Jack) Strath (1954) - retired locomotive engineer with the Canadian National Railway and was active with the Brotherhood of Locomotive Engineers. First elected to town council in 1937.
- Donald R. Russell (1955–1967) - pharmacist who had run a drug store in New Toronto since 1933. Served as first chairman of the Lakeshore Board of Education before being elected to town council in 1954. After amalgamation, he was elected to the Etobicoke Board of Control for two terms.

== See also ==
- Jackson Creek (Toronto)
