= St. Teresa Roman Catholic Church (New Toronto) =

St Teresa Roman Catholic Church
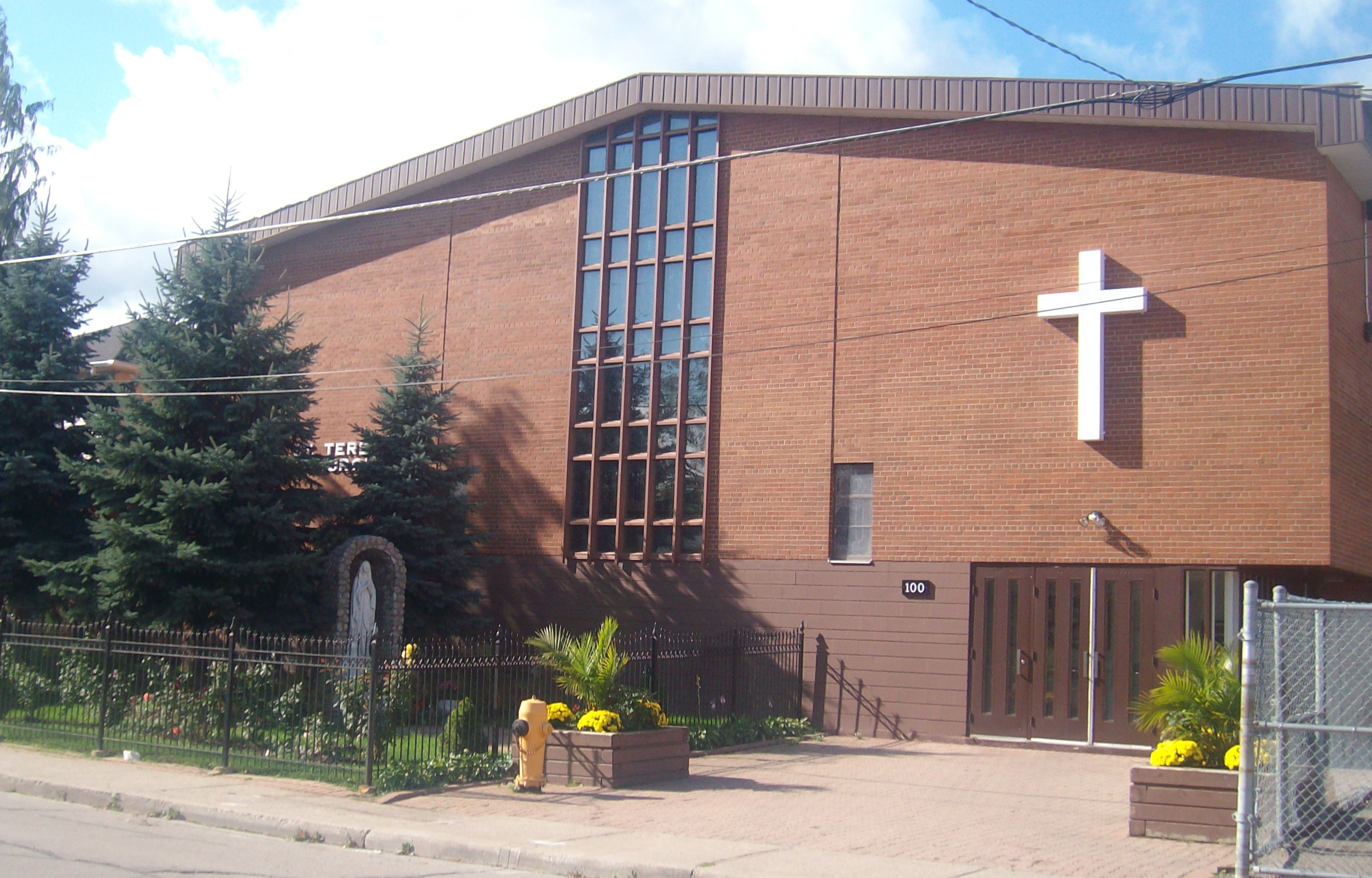
- St Teresa Roman Catholic Church
- 43°35′56″N 79°30′34″W
- Location: 123 Eleventh Street; Toronto, Ontario; M8V 3G6
- Denomination: Roman Catholic
- Website: www.stteresatoronto.ca

History
- Founded: 1924
- Dedication: St Thérèse

Administration
- Diocese: Archdiocese of Toronto

Clergy
- Pastor: Fr. Joe Morawski

St. Teresa Roman Catholic Church is in the former town of New Toronto in Etobicoke, Toronto, Ontario, Canada and a part of the Roman Catholic Archdiocese of Toronto. It serves the local Father John Redmond Catholic Secondary School.

== History ==
St. Teresa Church was formed out of St. Leo's, Mimico 1924 to serve the Town of New Toronto. The congregation worshipped in the Century Hall (on Sixth Street) until the old church on Tenth Street was finished the next year, 1925. The first pastor, Fr. Clancy who chose the dedication for the parish (St. Theresa), was succeeded by Fr. Carroll as the Second World War began in 1939, bringing in a period of many changes for the parish. Christ the King Roman Catholic Church, Long Branch was formed out of St. Theresa's in 1939 to serve the growing village (former sea side resort) to the west. With the end of the war, many Polish families began to move into the area from war-torn Europe, taking work at local industries; this led to the 1957 founding of St. Teresa Catholic Elementary School beside the church. After liturgical changes in the Latin Rite, a new, modernist style church was built on Eleventh Street in 1967; the old church was demolished. The local Father John Redmond Catholic Secondary School, which serves all the southern Etobicoke parishes, recently moved from the Alderwood area into the nearby former Mimico Asylum grounds which is in St Teresa's Parish.

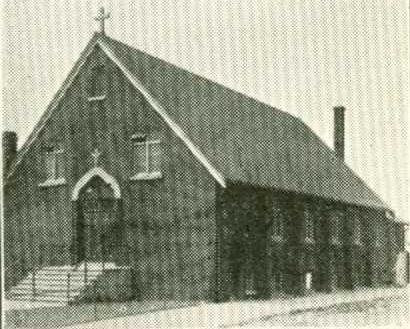
Original St Theresa's Church in 1937

== Pastors ==
- Rev. A. Clancy (1925 - 1938)
- Rev. M. Carroll (1938 - 1972)
- Rev. Jan Burczyk (2002 - 2012)
- Rev. Adam Gabriel (2012-2016)
- Rev. Dariusz Lewandowski (current)

== See also ==
- New Toronto
- St. Teresa Catholic Elementary School, New Toronto
- St. Leo's Roman Catholic Church, Mimico
- Roman Catholic Archdiocese of Toronto
