= Lakeshore Lions Arena =

Ice hockey facility in Toronto, Ontario

Coordinates: 43.600052°N 79.52149°W

The Lakeshore Lions Arena (Lakeshore Lions Memorial Centre) is a former ice hockey facility in Toronto, Ontario, Canada. It was operated in the Long Branch neighbourhood of Etobicoke by the Lakeshore Lions Club. It is the former practice facility for the Toronto Maple Leafs NHL hockey team, and the Toronto Marlies AHL farm team.

The old arena was a two-storey rink built in 1951 at 300 Birmingham Street. In 2010, it was repurposed as the Humber College Arts and Media Studio.

The Lions opened a new facility, called the MasterCard Centre for Hockey Excellence, to replace the old arena in fall 2009, located northeast of the original rink, at 400 Kipling Avenue. The club spent three years on negotiations, and CA$250,000 on planning.

Brian Hoskins, vice-chairman of the arena board told the Humber EtCetera, "This is a sports facility operated by a not-for-profit service club. All the profits go back to the community. We have to have professional tenants to make it work. Our primary time is occupied here by youth hockey. The Leafs are here from 10 a.m. to 2 p.m. when we don't have a lot of use of it. That is why it is such a good marriage for us."
