= Lakeshore Psychiatric Hospital =

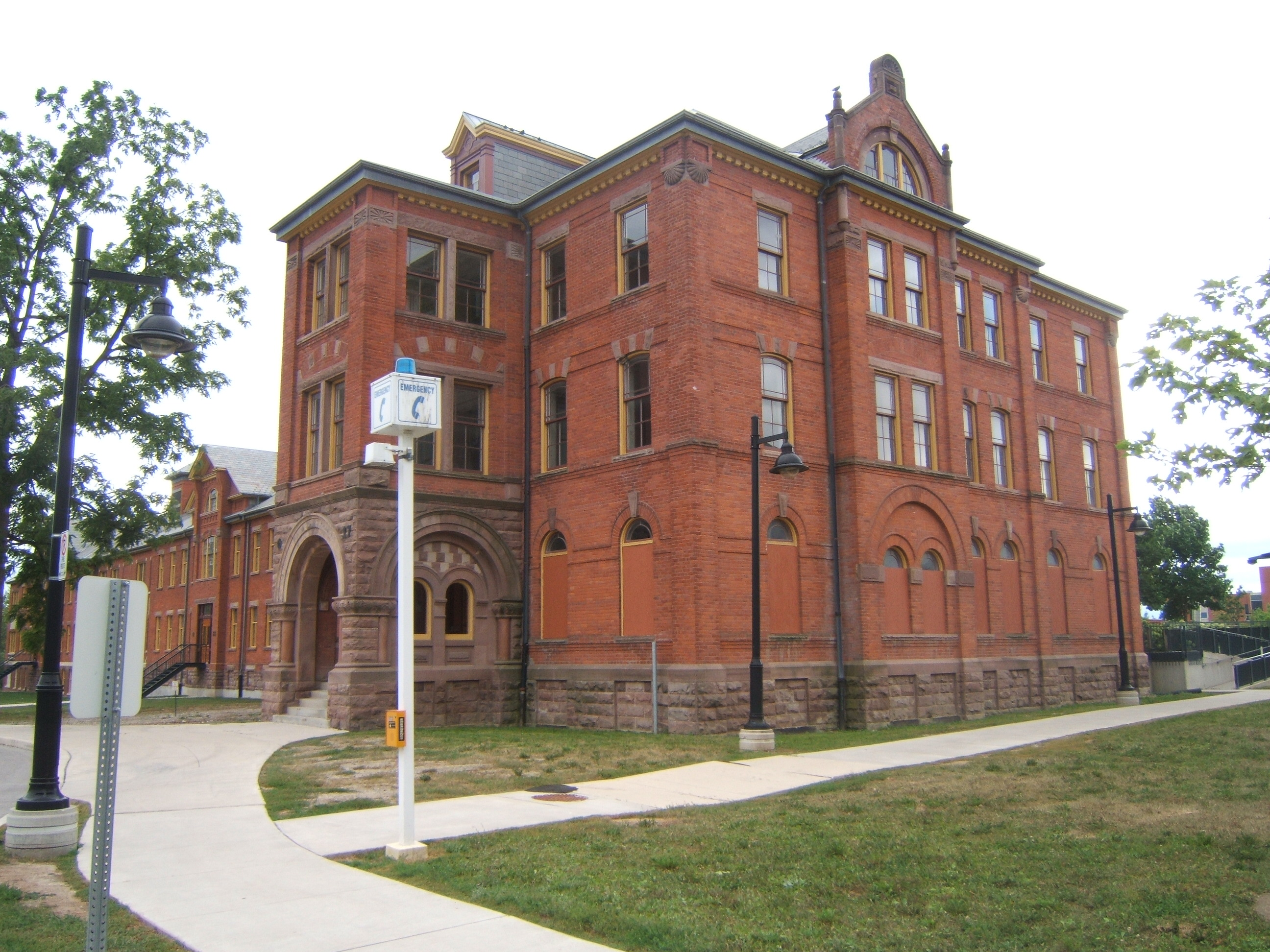

Geography
- Location: New Toronto, Ontario, Canada
- Coordinates: 43°35′52″N 79°30′57″W

Organization
- Type: psychiatric hospital

History
- Founded: 1889
- Closed: 1979

Links
- Lists: Hospitals in Canada

The Lakeshore Psychiatric Hospital was a psychiatric hospital located in the town of New Toronto, Ontario (now part of the city of Toronto). The hospital grounds now form part of Humber College's Lakeshore Campus.

== History ==
The hospital was built in 1888. as the Mimico Asylum. The doors officially opened on 21 January 1889.

The original idea for the hospital's design of a cottage system was Doctor Joseph Workman who wanted a hospital that would not feel like an institution. The architect for the site was Kivas Tully, who worked with gardener Samuel Matheson, designed the original facility under the supervision of the Superintendent of the Queen Street Asylum, Dr. Daniel K. Clark.

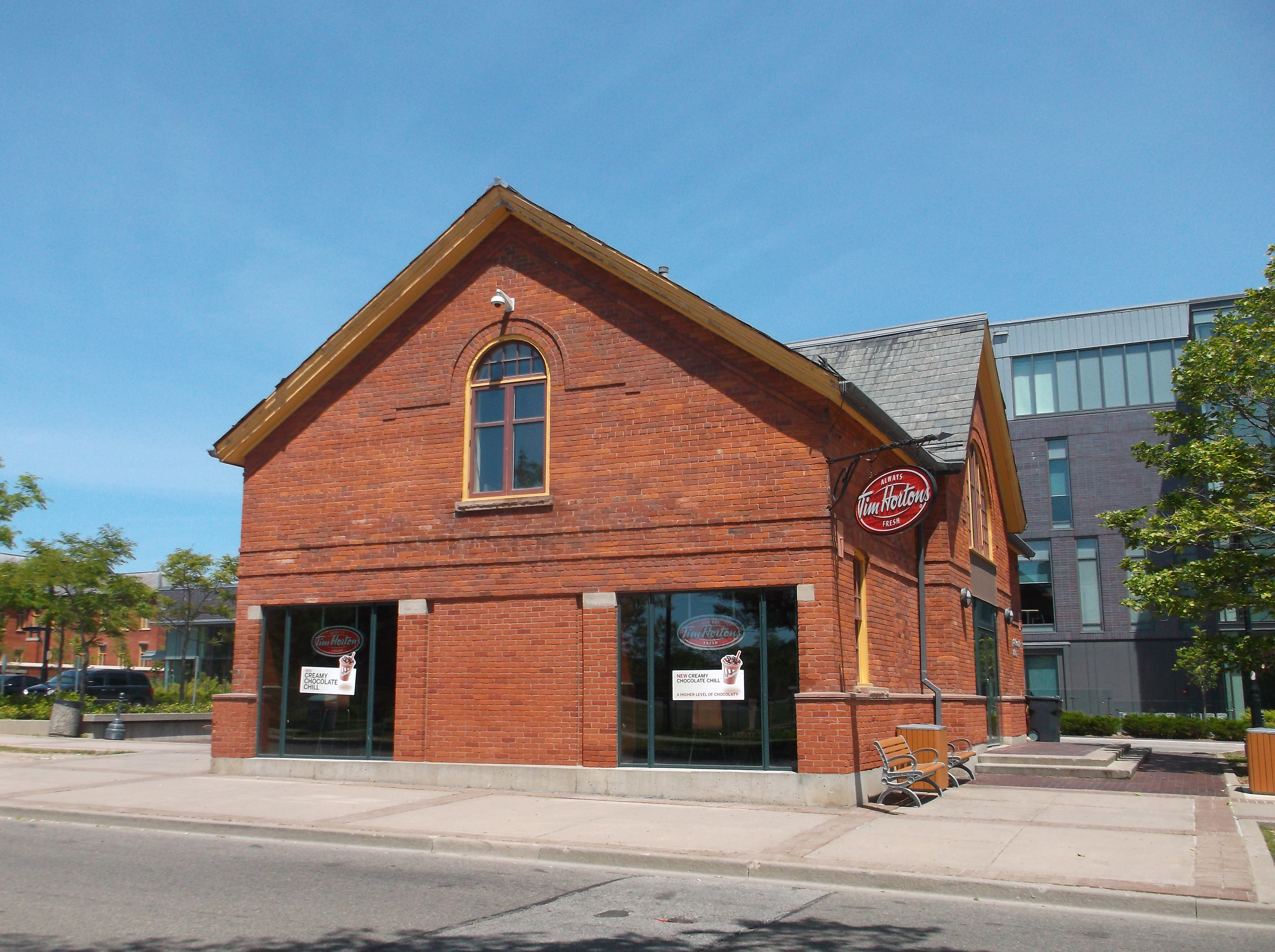
The former carriage house, now a Tim Hortons

Most of the buildings were built by the patients themselves. Patients also helped with the laundry and tended to the gardens.

The Assembly Hall, now operated by the City of Toronto, was built by the patients in 1898 as a recreation location for the patients, staff, and the public. Sunday worship services were also conducted at the Assembly Hall.

The hospital also had its own cemetery, located in the vicinity of Evans Avenue and Horner Avenue (on and off ramps on south side of the Gardiner next to Islington Nurseries). The cemetery contains the remains of 1,511 former patients of the hospital. It's about 3 km north of the former hospital, tucked between the Gardiner Expressway and a strip of suburban businesses. Flat stones currently mark fewer than 200 graves.

A powerhouse for the site was built in the 1930s to provide heat for the cottages.

After several decades of use, the hospital was renovated starting in 1959 by then superintendent, Doctor H.C Moorehouse.

The site was closed as a hospital on September 1, 1979 with the last 280 patients being transferred to other sites. The decision to close the site was due to its needing to be renovated again. At its height in 1950, the hospital housed 1,391 patients.

In 1988, the site was designated as a historic property.

== As a filming location ==
Prior to the hospital's 1979 closure, the 1977 film Equus, starring Richard Burton, was shot here.

After the closure of the hospital, the property's use as a filming location continued. Notably in the movies Phobia, Higher Education, and Police Academy as well as its sequels, Police Academy 3: Back in Training and Police Academy 4: Citizens on Patrol. An actual asylum scene from SCTV's McKenzie Bros. 1983 comedy film, Strange Brew, was filmed at the location.

It also provided the setting for the fictional police station (in an unnamed northeastern North American metropolis) that the 1985 Canadian-produced police procedural Night Heat is centred around as well as the fictional Matheson Academy in the Netflix 2020 series Locke & Key.

== Humber College ==
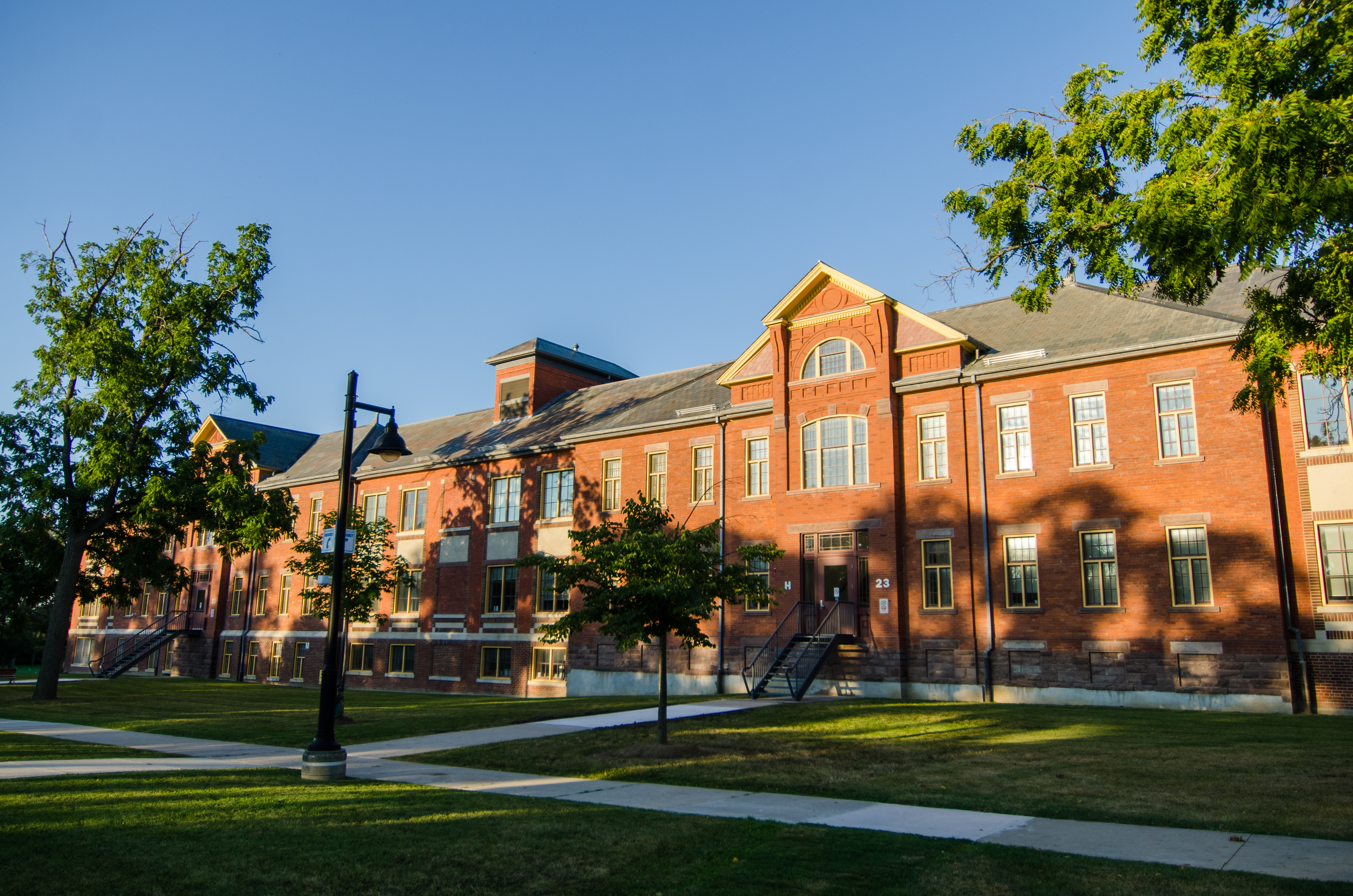
H Building

In 1991, Humber College signed a 99-year lease on the property. The College then started renovating the cottages for use as offices and classrooms. By April 2015, all but the Administration building, known as Building G were renovated. This last cottage underwent restoration and was opened in September 2016 as the Centre for Entrepreneurship.

== Today ==
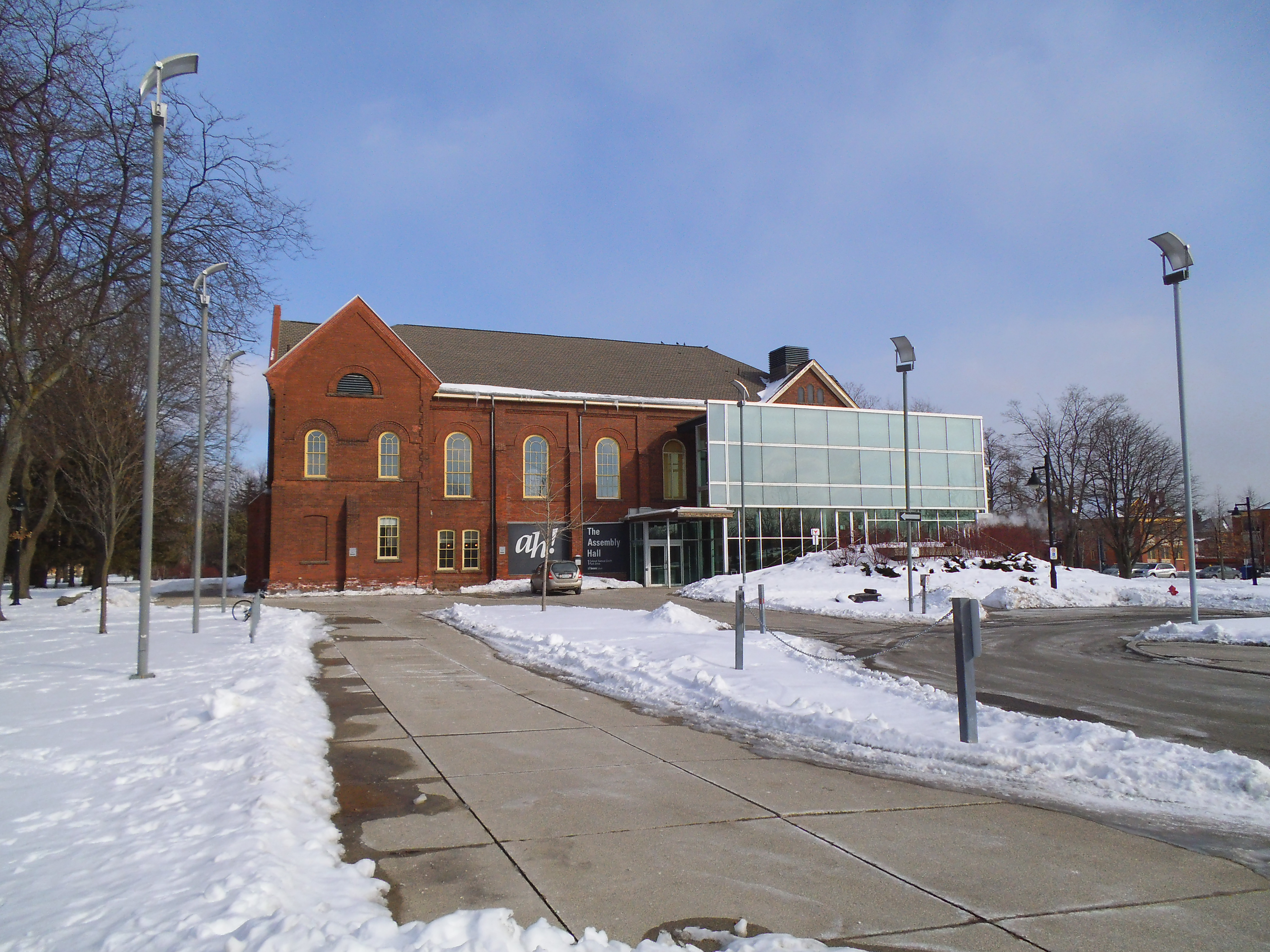
The Assembly Hall

All of the cottages have been rebuilt by Humber College for their purposes.

In 1999, the former Gatehouse was rebuilt and became a supportive centre for children.

The former powerhouse now has an outdoor skating rink beside it and the building itself has change rooms and washrooms for those who wish to skate.

The former Superintendent's residence is now part of the Jean Tweed Centre.

The Assembly Hall was renovated in 2000 and opened to the public in 2001. It is now operated by the City of Toronto.

The grounds are now open to the public as a park.

A Tim Hortons occupies the former Carriage House.

A new Welcome Centre was built and opened in September 2016. The Registrar's Office, Health and Career Services have been relocated in this new building.

== Name ==
The hospital was opened as the Mimico Asylum, but changed names several times over the years, becoming the Mimico Insane Asylum in 1894, the Mimico Hospital for the Insane in 1911, the Ontario Hospital (Mimico) in 1920, the Ontario Hospital, New Toronto in 1934, before finally becoming the Lakeshore Psychiatric Hospital in 1964.
