= Humber Polytechnic =

Public college in Toronto, Canada

Coordinates: 43°43′42″N 79°36′21″W

Humber College Institute of Technology and Advanced Learning
- Other name: Humber Polytechnic
- Motto: Carpe opportunitas (Latin)
- Motto in English: "Seize opportunities"
- Type: Public college
- Established: 1967; 59 years ago
- Academic affiliations: CBIE; CICan; Polytechnics Canada
- President: Ann Marie Vaughan
- Faculty: 3,400
- Students: 2025: 16,509 FTEs
- Location: Toronto, Ontario, Canada
- Campus: Urban
- Colours: Gold and blue
- Nickname: Hawks
- Sporting affiliations: CCAA – OCAA
- Mascot: Howie the Hawk
- Website: www.humber.ca

The Humber College Institute of Technology and Advanced Learning, branded as Humber Polytechnic since 2024, is a public college in Toronto, Ontario, Canada. Founded in 1967, Humber has three main campuses and locations – the Humber North campus, the Lakeshore campus, and the International Graduate School. Today, Humber boasts over 200 programs, 86,000 full time students and 9,300 international students.

== Programs ==
Humber offers more than 200 programs, including bachelor's degree, diploma, certificate, post-graduate certificate and apprenticeship programs, across 17 areas of interest. Humber also provides academic advisors and resources, such as a career finder. Beyond this, Humber also provides Bridging (or Bridge Training) Programs for internationally trained professionals in the fields of engineering and information technology.

Humber serves more than 86,000 learners.

== History ==
Humber College was established in 1967 under its founding President, Gordon Wragg. The first new section of Humber opened on Monday, September 11, 1967, at James S. Bell Elementary School, a public school on Lake Shore Boulevard West. The Lakeshore Campus began with the addition of the manpower retraining programs on Queen Elizabeth Way in Etobicoke. In November 1968, North Campus was officially opened by Mayor Edward A. Horton of Etobicoke and Mayor Jack Moulton of York. In the early 1970s, student enrolment was rapidly increasing which led Humber to expand its business and technology programs at both the North and Lakeshore Campuses. Humber had the largest group of business students in the province. Three-year co-op programs were developed in the early 1970s in a range of technology and business programs. Humber became Canada's largest college with over 27,000 full-time and 50,000 part-time learners.

By the early 1980s, Humber was developing programs to respond to business and industry demands by focusing on flexibility in class schedules, including a weekend college. Its skill-based training courses included self-paced programming and, along with Holland College in Prince Edward Island, became one of the National Centers for industry-driven DACUM curriculum. Humber introduced flexible manufacturing and was a pioneer in introducing computer applications in technology programs. Lakeshore Campus, at its new permanent location on the lakeshore, was the first college to introduce a solar technology program to respond to the needs of that growing industry of the time. Humber had a large international outreach program, working in over 20 countries. With the assistance of ADB, the Government of Canada (CIDA), it developed the largest international program of all of the Canadian colleges by 1987, introducing the concept of responsive tertiary education to countries throughout Africa and Asia.

In the fall of 1980, building F was used for filming of the film The Last Chase which was released the following year. In 1983, the campus was used for the filming of the first Police Academy film, which was released the following year.

After the mid-1980s, the college concentrated more on arts and applied arts programs while refocusing energy on internal processes and local activities, rather than program innovation and national or international activities. It is an Ontario Institute of Technology and Advanced Learning. On February 2, 2009, Humber students became the first to contact an astronaut in orbit using an apparatus they built and operated. They made contact with Sandra Magnus at the International Space Station from a lab room at the school's Rexdale campus.

On August 29, 2024, Humber College announced a name change to Humber Polytechnic, to better reflect the education model as “one that combines deep, theoretical learning with applied, hands-on experience to foster employability, not just employment for graduates.” However, the college's official legal name remains Humber College Institute of Technology and Advanced Learning.

== Academic faculties ==
- Faculty of Applied Sciences & Technology
- Longo Faculty of Business
- Faculty of Media, Creative Arts, and Design
- Faculty of Liberal Arts & Sciences and Innovative Learning
- Faculty of Social & Community Services
- Faculty of Health & Life Sciences

== Campuses ==
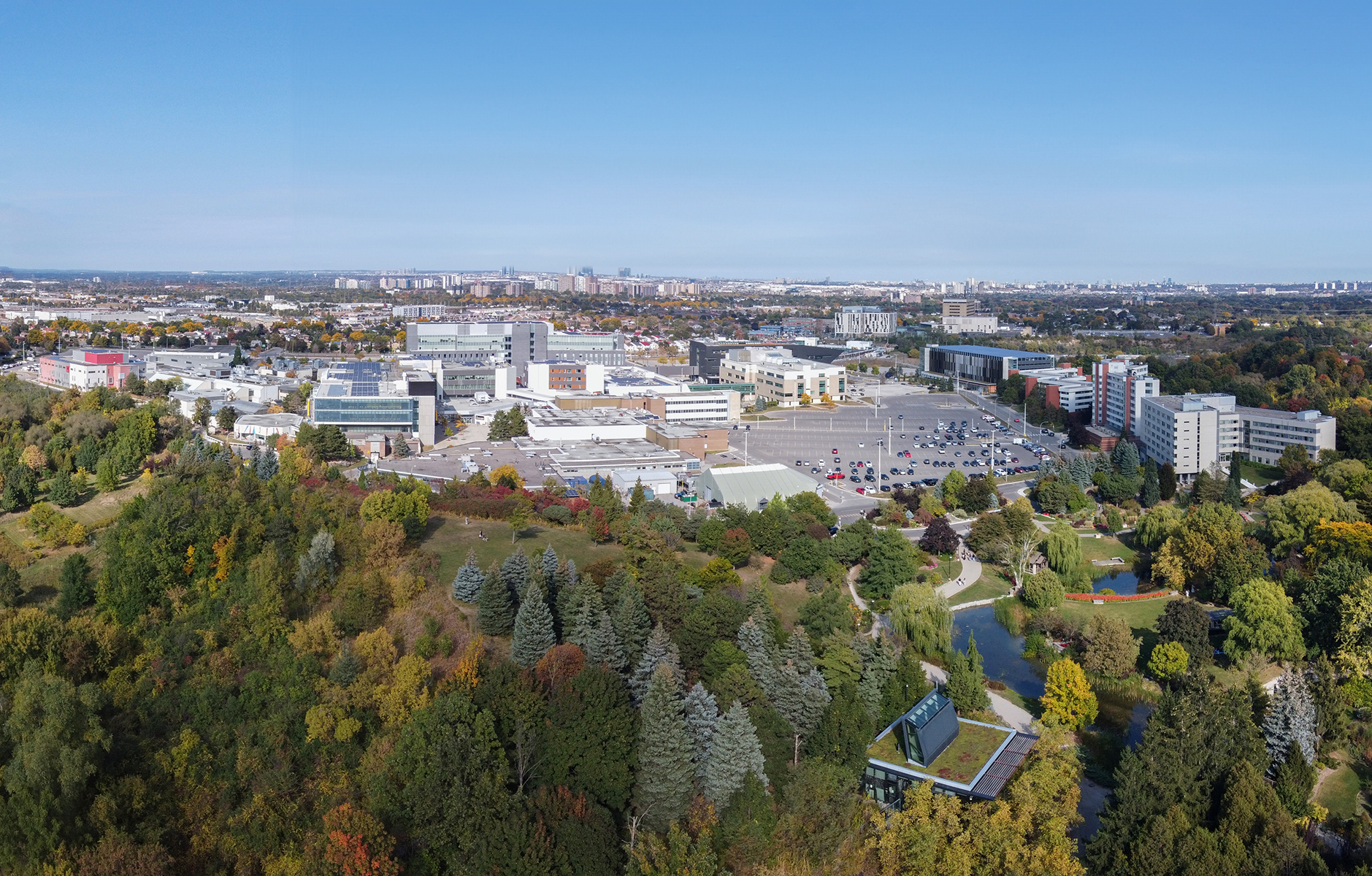
Humber North Campus Aerial view

=== Humber North Campus ===
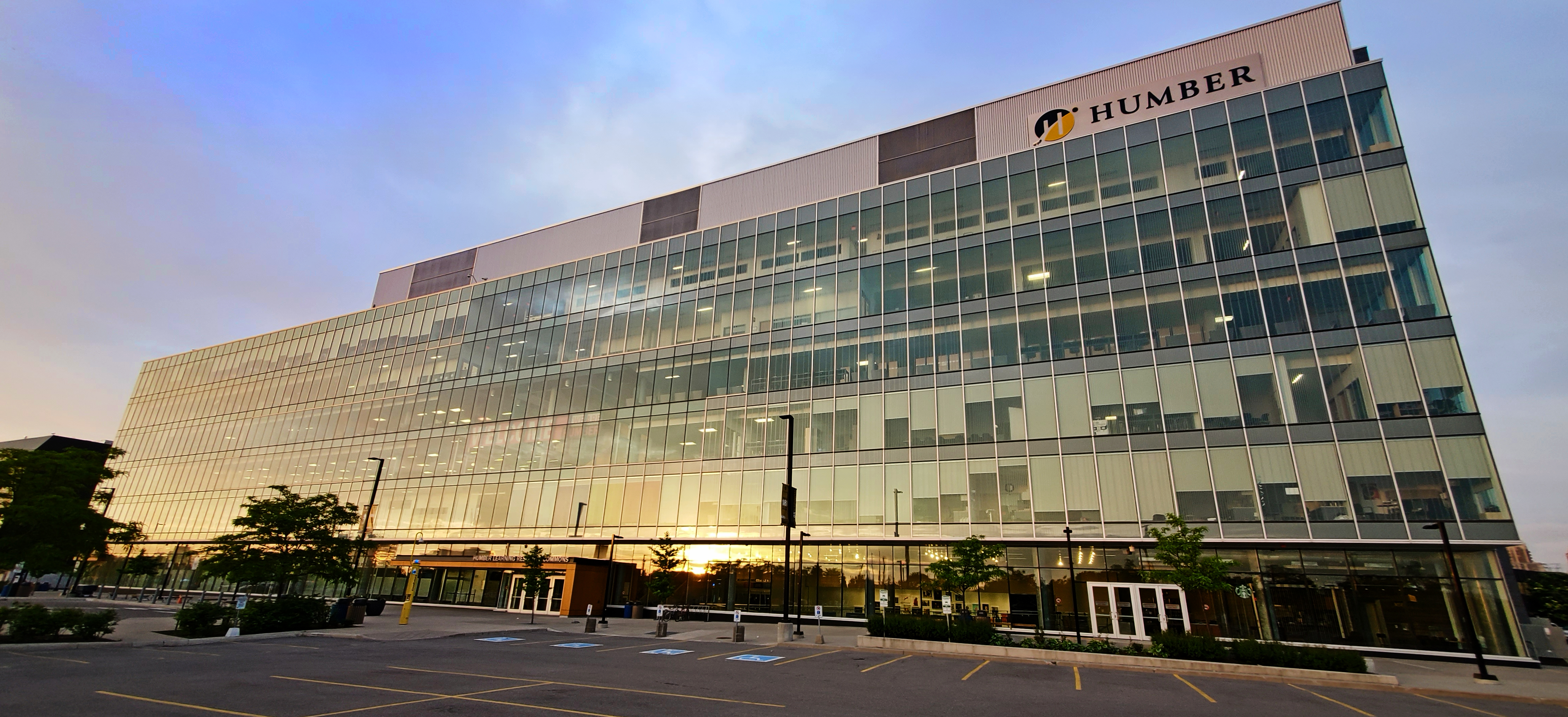
Humber Learning Resource Commons (LRC) which serves as the entrance for Humber Polytechnic North Campus.

Located in Etobicoke, an administrative district of the northwest of the city of Toronto, adjacent to the Humber River, the Humber North Campus has approximately 20,000 full-time and 57,000 part-time students, 1,000 of them living in residence. The campus offers full-time and part-time programs in various fields including Business, Applied Technology, Health Sciences, Media Studies, Liberal Arts, Hospitality and Tourism. In addition to that, the campus also has an indoor pool and sauna, athletics facilities and a fully functioning spa. North Campus is home to the Funeral Service Education program, one of only two FSE programs offered in the province.

On April 18, 2015, Humber opened the Humber Learning Resource Commons (LRC) which serves as the new main entrance for the campus. The 264,000-square-foot building has six floors and features a student gallery and commons, a new library, enhanced student services, the Registrar's Office, Student Recruitment, Student Success & Engagement, the International Centre, the School of Liberal Arts & Sciences and administrative offices. The building was designed by B+H Architects and it cost $79 million to build, $74.5 million of which were funded by Ministry of Training, Colleges and Universities.

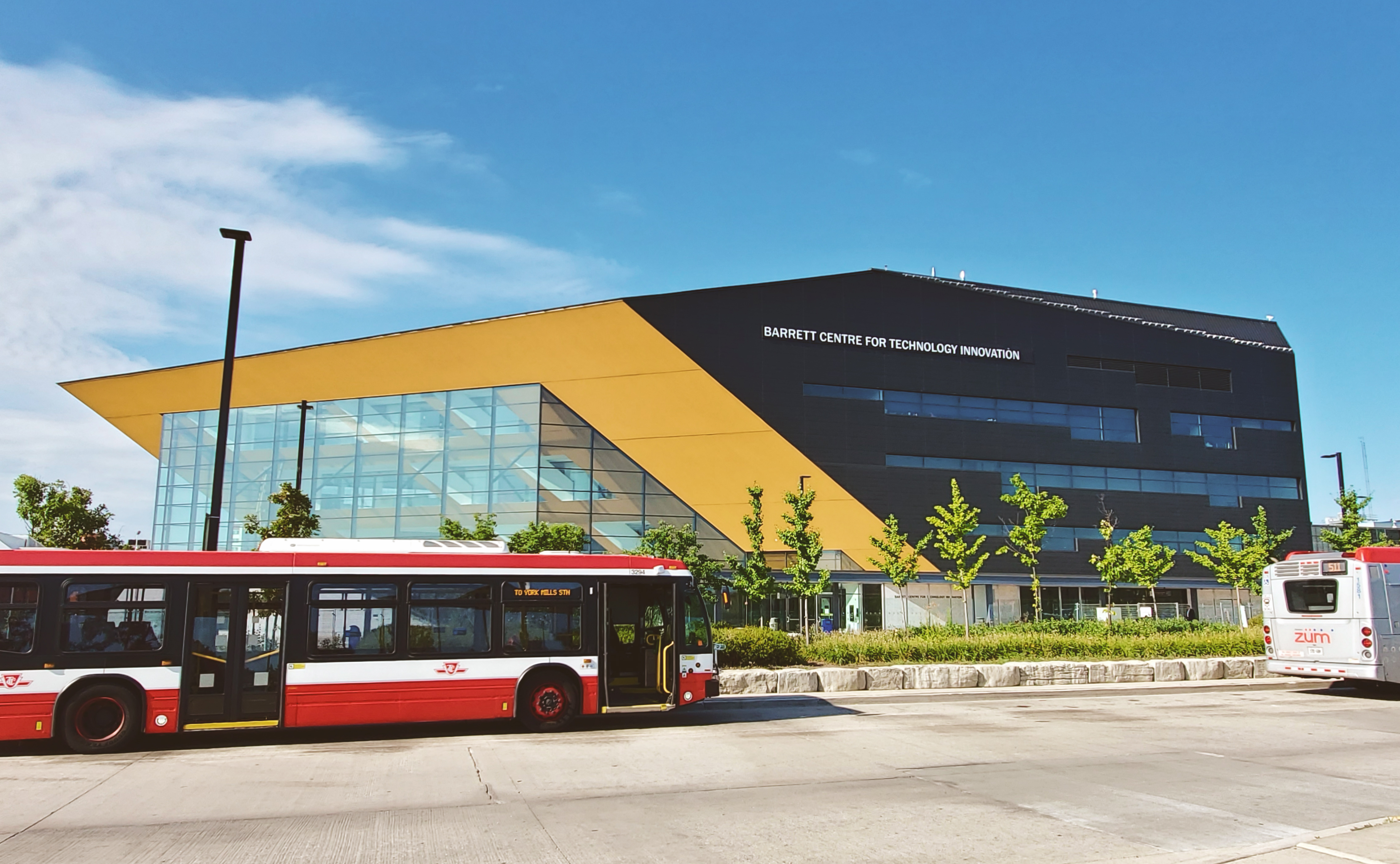
The Barrett Centre for Technology Innovation located at Humber Polytechnic North Campus.

==== Barrett Centre for Technology Innovation ====
The Barrett Centre for Technology Innovation, located at Humber's North Campus, is home to many applied research projects with diverse partners across multiple sectors. It builds on Humber's expertise in areas such as automation, robotics, systems integration, user experience testing, applied research and work-integrated learning. Some of the key features include interactive technology zones, digital media studios, cutting-edge prototyping and makerspaces, open concept gathering spaces and demonstration areas for new products and technologies. The 93,000 sq. ft. centre cost about $27 million, $10 million of which were funded by The Barrett Family Foundation. The Government of Canada provided additional funding of $15.5 million from the Post-Secondary Strategic Investment Fund, and the Government of Ontario provided $1.55 million from the College Equipment and Renewal Fund for the purchase of key equipment within the building.

Humber Polytechnic Lakeshore Campus

=== Humber Lakeshore Campus ===
Located along the shores of Lake Ontario, at Kipling and Lake Shore Blvd. W, Humber's Lakeshore Campus located in New Toronto has approximately 7,200 full-time students, with 400 living in residence. The Lakeshore Campus sits on the large grounds of the former Lakeshore Psychiatric Hospital and Lakeshore Teachers' College, in the west-end New Toronto neighborhood of Toronto (formerly Etobicoke). When leased by Humber, the college vowed to keep the historical site in good condition and enhance its park-like setting as an asset to the Southern Etobicoke community. The campus now consists of a number of cottage buildings and the more modern and now renovated Lakeshore Teachers College facilities that were extensively re-worked in the early 1980s. The L-Building was opened in 2011 at the Lakeshore Campus, as an addition to the cottages located around it. In May 2013, artist Harley Valentine's sculpture Persephone, after the mythic Greek queen of the underworld, was installed in the front plaza of the L-Building. The Lakeshore Campus was used as the location of the Police Academy in the 'Police Academy' film series.

=== Queensway Campus ===
In 1968, Humber opened Queensway 1 Campus which was located at 56 Queen Elizabeth Blvd; however, it was later renamed Lakeshore 2 Campus in 1975. It was home to Funeral Service Education Program which was launched for the first time in 1968/69 academic year. The campus closed its doors in 1989 and the program was moved to the North campus as part of the Health Sciences Division.

=== Other locations ===
On September 25, 2019, Humber announced the decision to close its Orangeville campus at the end of June 2021 and launch a new International Graduate School in downtown Toronto.

The Humber Centre for Skilled Trades and Technology and the Humber Transportation Training Centre each operate from facilities near but separated from the North Campus, offering applied training in subjects such as construction trades and truck driving respectively.

== Facilities ==
=== Digital Broadcast Centre ===
This centre is home to Humber TV, Radio Humber and all newspaper, magazine and web production. Humber is the only GTA College with a CRTC campus instructional license and fully operational radio station, 96.9 Radio Humber.

=== Arts and Media Studio ===
The old Lakeshore Lions Arena at 300 Birmingham Street is now home to Humber's Arts and Media Studio, and opened in 2010. The site is part of the Lakeshore Campus site.

=== Centre for Urban Ecology ===
The LEED gold certified building includes a green roof, passive solar heating and a biofilter system. It is the only Platinum EcoCentre in Ontario.

== Notable alumni ==
- Andres Arango, Canadian soccer player
- Nicole Arbour, Internet personality
- Darren Barrett, Canadian jazz musician
- Herbert L. Becker (Applied and Creative Arts – Theatre/music 1975), Juno Award, author, actor, magician.
- Yolanda Bonnell, actress and playwright
- Ben Bowen, musician and songwriter
- Alysha Brillinger, Canadian jazz musician
- Michael A. Brown, Ontario politician
- Kayt Burgess, writer
- Tassie Cameron, Canadian television producer and writer
- Kurtis Conner, Canadian YouTuber
- Adam Copeland (Radio Broadcasting), actor, professional wrestler for the WWE, better known by his ring name "Edge"
- Anthony de Sa, novelist and writer
- Brian Dickinson (Applied and Creative Arts – Music), pianist
- Nathan Fielder, comedian and actor
- Doug Ford, Premier of Ontario, attended for two months
- C. B. Forrest, Canadian writer and poet
- Ajay Fry, television host, Innerspace
- Giacomo Gianniotti, Italian-Canadian actor
- Anne-Marie Green, news anchor
- Caity Gyorgy (Vocal Jazz), musician, 2022 Juno winner
- Margaret Lindsay Holton, artist and author
- Mike Inglis, sports broadcaster
- Don Landry (Radio Broadcasting), former morning host on CJCL The Fan590, sportscaster, writer, and Toronto Argonauts stadium announcer
- Aaron Leaney, Canadian saxophonist, band leader, and composer
- Larnell Lewis, Canadian drummer, producer, and educator
- Shawn Little (Health Sciences), Ottawa City Council
- Gilson Lubin (Comedy), MTV Live
- Molly McGlynn, film and television director and screenwriter
- Donna McLeod, Georgia State Representative
- Ale Nuñez, jazz singer
- Bev Oda, retired Canadian politician
- Nikki Payne, stand up comedian
- Jared Pelletier (Film Production), film director
- Renee Percy (Comedy), writer and performer; winner of Phil Hartman Award
- Dina Pugliese, co-host of Breakfast Television
- Cara Ricketts, actress
- Sid Seixeiro, co-host of Breakfast Television
- Sidhu Moose Wala, Punjabi singer
- Eric Smith, sports journalist
- George Stroumboulopoulos (Radio Broadcasting, 1994), host of George Stroumboulopoulos Tonight, host of CBC News: The Hour, former MuchMusic VJ
- Dione Taylor (Vocal Jazz), musician
- Elias Theodorou (Creative Advertising), professional mixed martial artist currently for the UFC
- Georgia Toews, Canadian novelist
- Francine Villeneuve (Horse Racing), first female Canadian thoroughbred jockey to win 1,000 races and former all-time winningest Canadian female
- Greg Wells (Applied and Creative Arts – Music), record producer
- K. Trevor Wilson, comedian

== Arms ==
Coat of arms of Humber Polytechnic

Notes
Granted 15 September 2005
Crest
Issuant from a circlet Or the upper rim set with hazelnuts and trillium flowers Proper a demi Pegasus Azure crined wingedunguled and holding between its legs a cogwheel Or.
Escutcheon
Per bend sinister Argent and Or a pile reversed issuant from the dexter flank and truncated in chief in dexter chief three Ermine spots in pairle Azure.
Supporters
Two red-tailed hawks Proper each gorged with a collar pendent therefrom a cogwheel Azure charged with an open book Or standing on a grassy mound Vert above barry wavy Argent and Azure.
Motto
Carpe Opportunitates (Seize The Opportunities)

== See also ==
- Higher education in Ontario
- List of colleges in Ontario
- Humber College station, an LRT station serving North Campus
