= St. Leo's Roman Catholic Church (Mimico) =

St Leo's Roman Catholic Church
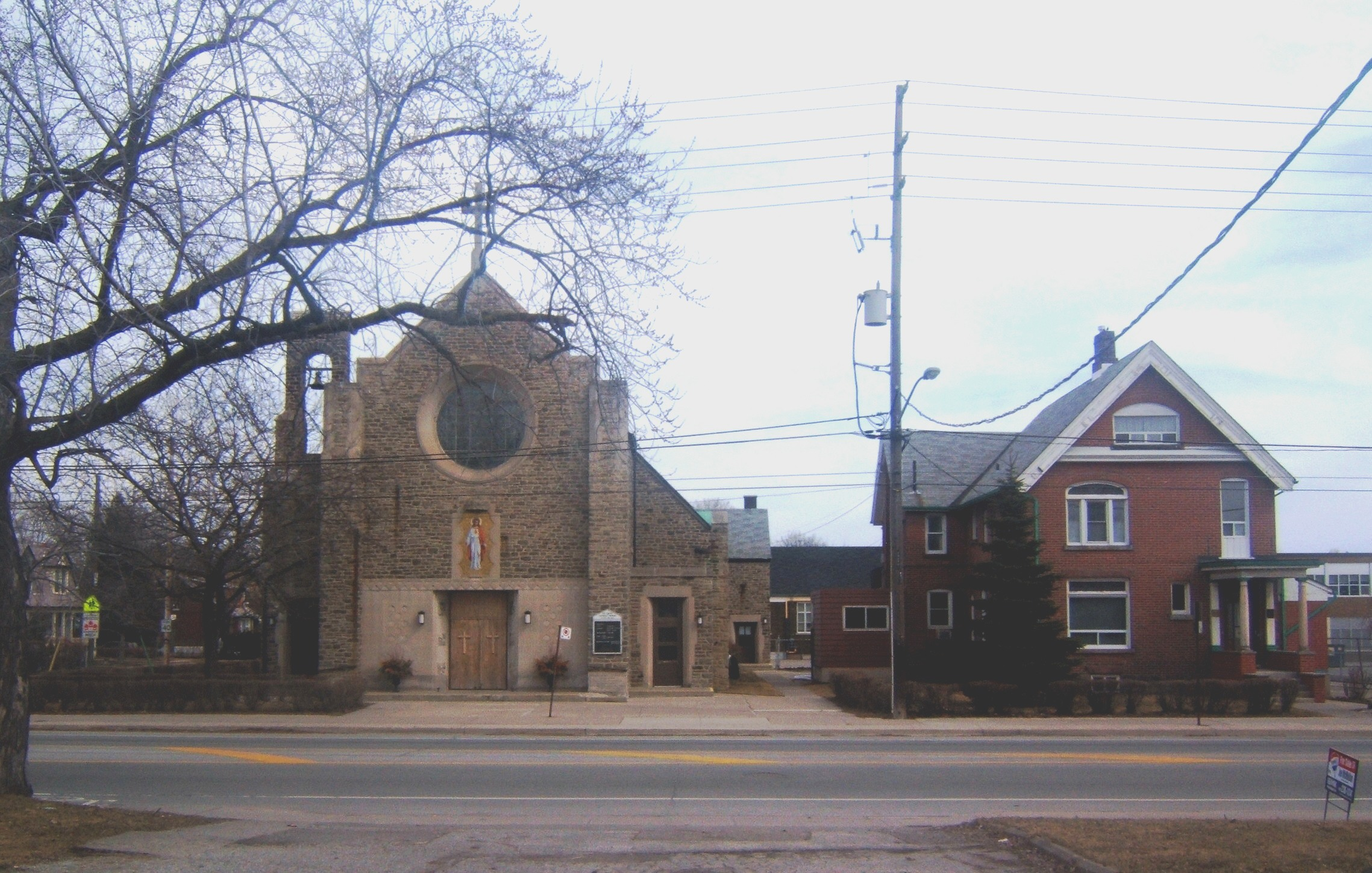
- The second St. Leo's church on Royal York Rd (formerly Church St)
- St Leo's Roman Catholic Church
- 43°36′51″N 79°29′51″W
- Location: 277 Royal York Road; Toronto, Ontario; M8V 2V8
- Denomination: Roman Catholic
- Website: stleoset.archtoronto.org

History
- Founded: 1909
- Dedication: Saint Leo

Administration
- Diocese: Archdiocese of Toronto

Clergy
- Pastor: Fr Nicola Defina

St. Leo's Roman Catholic Church is a Catholic church in Toronto, Ontario, Canada. It is located on Royal York Road (formerly Church Street) at Stanley, in the Mimico neighbourhood, part of Etobicoke. It is the oldest Catholic church in Etobicoke and the only Catholic church in Mimico.

== History ==
The first services were held at Eden Court one of only three remaining Victorian Houses on Royal York with St. Leo's Rectory, the building has been declared a historic building.

The original church opened as a mission of Holy Family in 1903 at 258 Royal York Road (then Church Street). In 1909 St. Leo's became a parish serving Swansea south of the College St extension (now Morningside Ave) and Mimico with its original boundaries: Lake Ontario, the Humber River, North Queen St (now Delroy Dr) and Mimico Ave (now Kipling Ave).

In 1920 the former western portion of Mimico became the Town of New Toronto, leading in 1924 to the building of St. Teresa's Catholic Church and the separation of this area from St. Leo's.

In 1926 the parish built St. Leo Elementary School across from the church. St. Leo Elementary School is the oldest Separate School in Etobicoke still open. With postwar Italian immigration to the northern half of Mimico, in 1947 the Mimico Separate School Board opened a second Catholic school for the parish north of the QEW; St. Louis Elementary School.

A new church was built across the street from the old at 277 Royal York Road in 1953 on the site of Mimico's 1858 post office.

In 1955 St. Mark's Catholic Church was built in Humber Bay neighbourhood and in 1961 Holy Angels was built for The Queensway neighbourhood, the area having been cut off from Mimico by the building of the Queen Elizabeth Way.

After liturgical changes in the Latin Rite led to the use of the vernacular (English) in place of Latin, St. Leo's began providing a separate liturgy for Italian parishioners. In 1960 a Parish Hall was built on the site of the Old Church.

In 1967 Mimico was amalgamated with Etobicoke. After full funding for Catholic Schools was introduced, the Public Board of Education offered the old Mimico High School to the Separate (Catholic) School Board which declined on the grounds that demographics changes in Etobicoke meant Mimico was no longer centrally located.

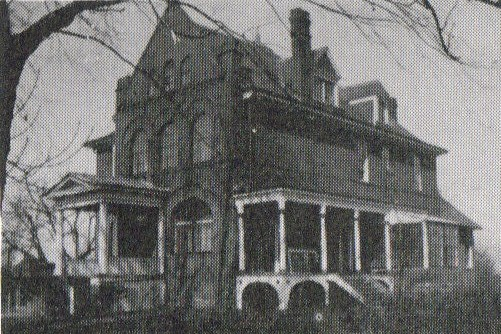
The Stock's 'Eden Court' estate pictured c. 1900

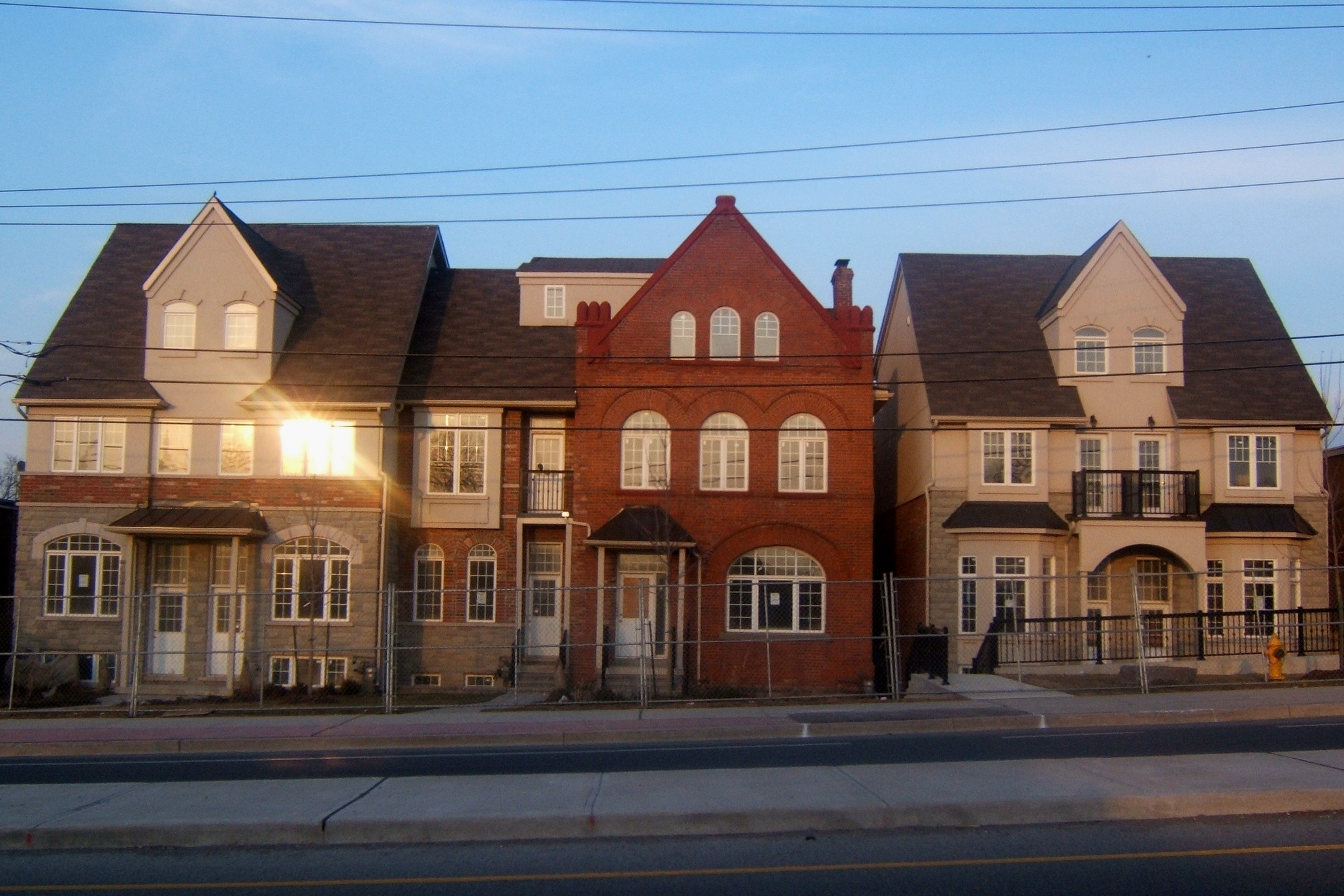
The Stock's 'Eden Court' in 2004

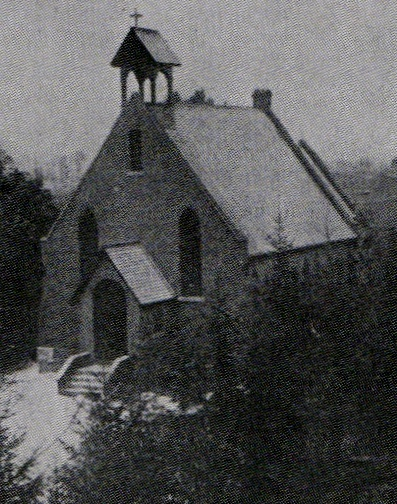
St Leo's Church (old) before additions, pictured in 1909

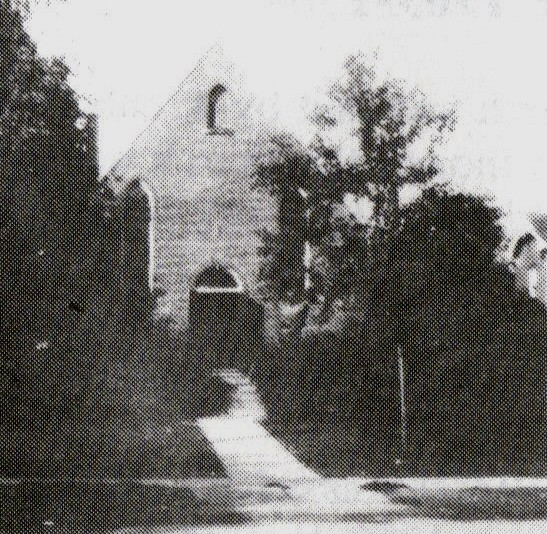
St Leo's Church (old) after additions, pictured in 1912

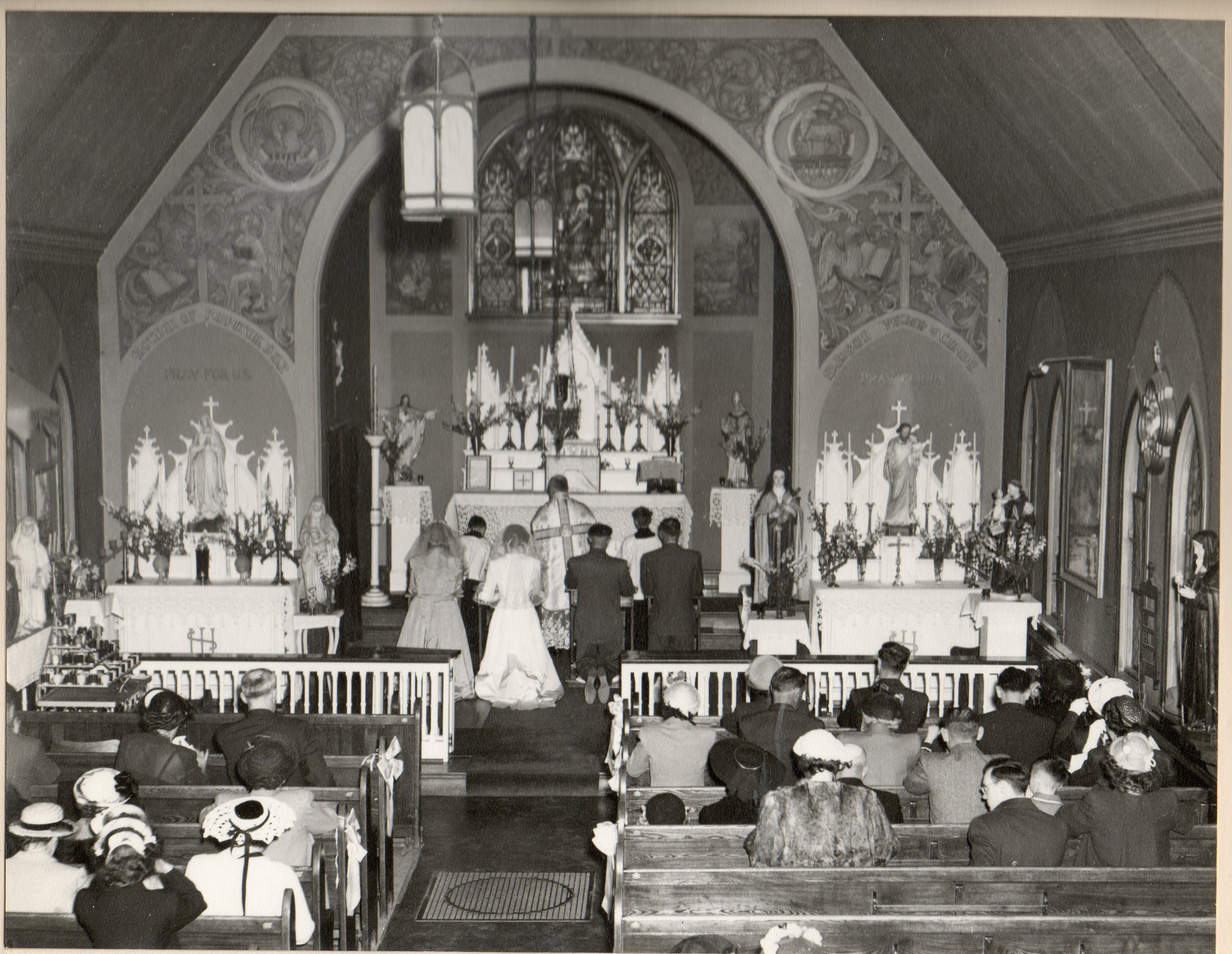
The interior of the old St. Leo's Church pictured in 1947

== Pastors ==
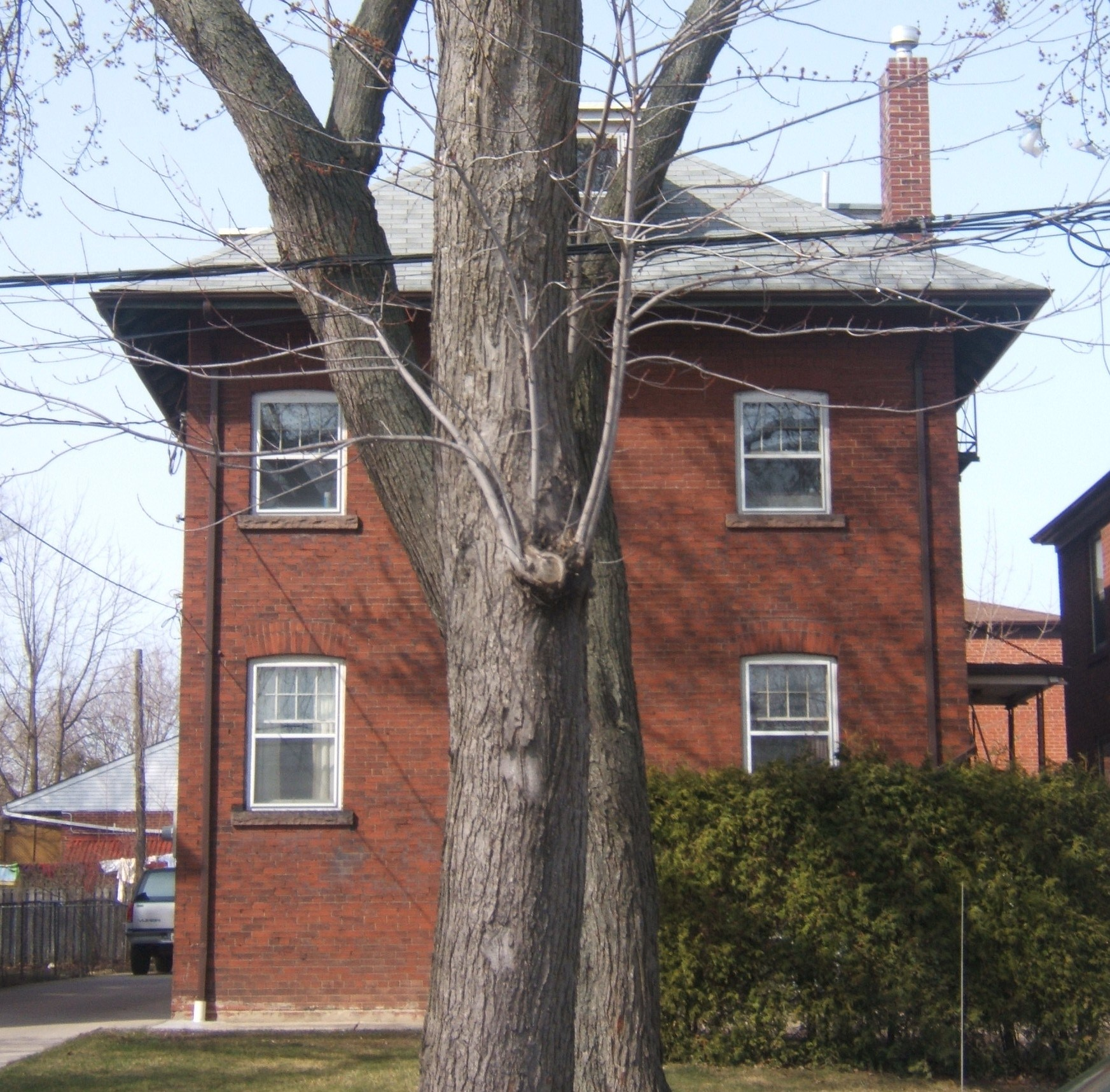
St. Leos Old Rectory 48 Station Rd.

- Jim Coyle (1903–1909)
- George Doherty (1909–1929).
- Edward Brennan (1929–1936)
- John Corrigan (1936–1946) Taught at St. Augustine's Seminary
- Louis Markle (1946–1970)
- Marshall Beriault (1970–1979)
- Thomas Cullen (1979–1994)
- Joseph Sultana (1994–2006)
- Giuliano Costato (2006–2007)
- Frank Carpinelli (2007–2021)
- Nick Defina (2021- )

== Schools ==
- St. Leo Catholic Elementary School, founded 1926
- St. Louis Catholic Elementary School, founded 1947

== See also ==
- Roman Catholic Archdiocese of Toronto
