= Marie Curtis Park =

Public park in Toronto, Canada

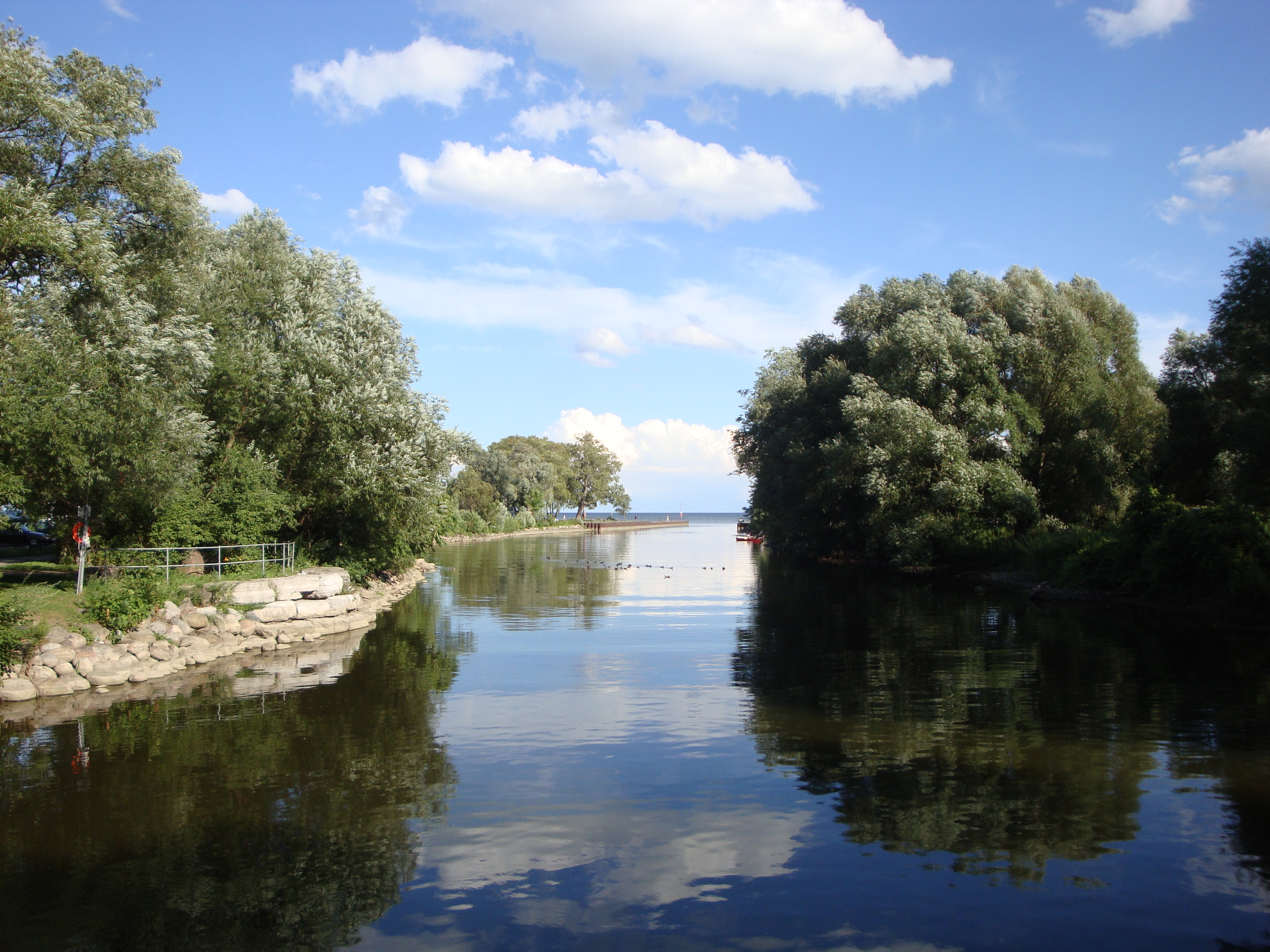
- Mouth of Etobicoke Creek at the park
- Interactive map of Marie Curtis Park
- Location: 2 Forty Second Street, Toronto, Ontario
- Coordinates: 43°35′12″N 79°32′38″W
- Area: 41 hectares (100 acres)
- Created: 1959
- Owner: Toronto and Region Conservation Authority
- Operator: Toronto Parks
- Website: Marie Curtis Park

Marie Curtis Park is a public park in Toronto, Ontario, Canada. It is located at the mouth of the Etobicoke Creek on Lake Ontario in the Long Branch area. The park replaced a neighbourhood severely damaged in the floods caused by Hurricane Hazel in 1954; 56 homes and cottages were destroyed, leaving 1,868 people homeless and 81 dead. It is named after Marie Curtis, who, when it was constructed, was reeve of the then-independent Long Branch.

== Geography ==
The park is located on both sides of Etobicoke Creek, south of Lakeshore Road/Lake Shore Boulevard West. The park's western boundary is the municipal boundary between Toronto on the east and Mississauga to the west. The boundary is just west of the dog off-leash area. When the boundary was established, Etobicoke Creek had a riverbed to the west of its present course. To the immediate west is Mississauga's Lakeshore Park, a former industrial site.

The park is a mostly deciduous forest with areas of meadow, savannah, thicket, woodland, plantation, with a shallow marsh, some sand dunes and sand beaches on either side of the creek mouth. A trail passes through the park from east to west, crossing the creek via a bridge. The river bank is landscaped with man-made materials where it meets Lake Ontario. Some of the alder trees on-site are estimated to be over 150 years old.

== Facilities ==
The park has a playground, wading pool, a two-colour children's labyrinth with a push-button activated spiral water fountain, a public swimming beach, a dog off-leash area, picnic spots and walking trails. The walking trails are part of the larger Martin Goodman Trail and Waterfront Trail network of trails along the Lake Ontario shore. On the western bank is a boat launching area and parking lot.

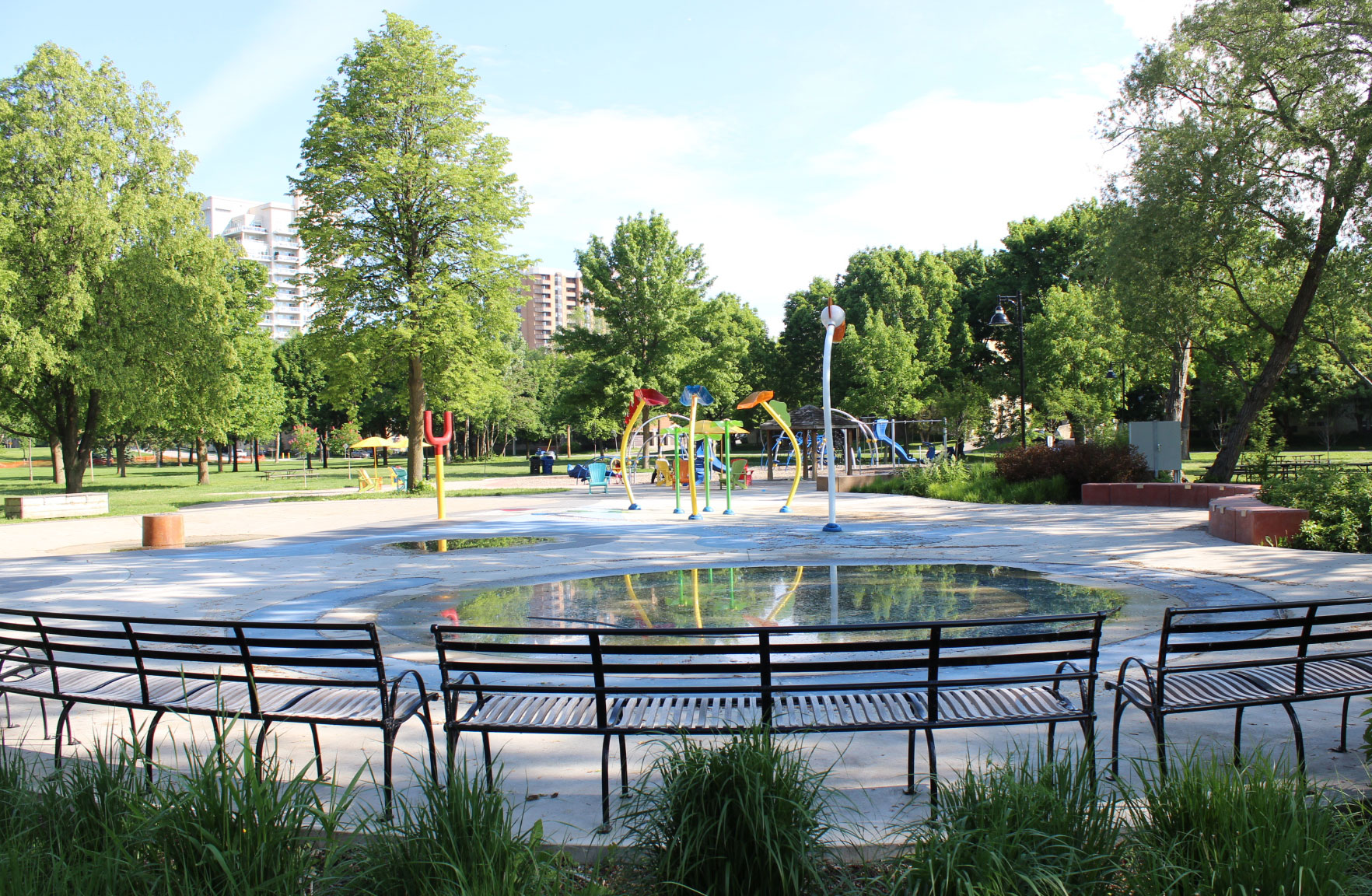
Children's water play area

=== Beach ===
The public swimming beach is located on the east bank of the Etobicoke Creek mouth. The beach is monitored from June to Labour Day by the City of Toronto for safe swimming as e.coli bacteria levels rise after rain-storms. It closes after major rainstorms until levels dissipate. The beach is the westernmost of the eleven beaches in Toronto and the one that is most frequently too polluted for swimming. It is not one of the Toronto beaches which are part of the Blue Flag program.

At the beach is a mounted 32-pounder cannon manufactured in 1803 by the Carron Company of Falkirk, Scotland. It had come from Quebec City in 1881 to decorate Riverdale Park.

== History ==
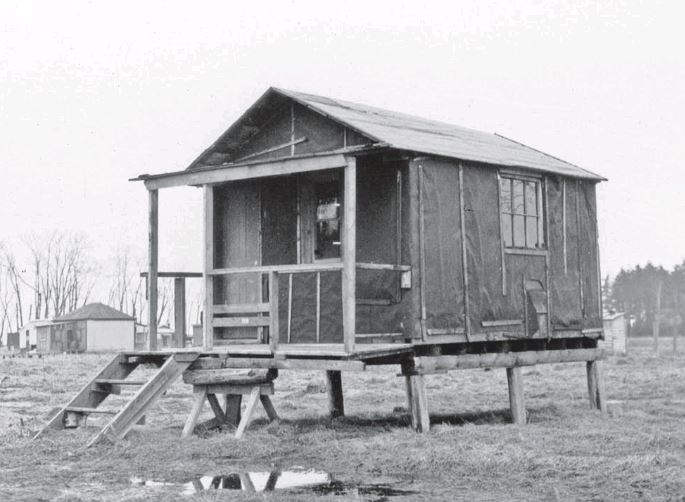
Cottage on Etobicoke Flats in Etobicoke Township, April 7, 1923.

In the late 1790s, this land was part of the Toronto Purchase of lands from the Mississaugas First Nation. In the park area, land, including the parklands, was granted to Colonel Samuel Smith, a United Empire Loyalist from New York who fought for Britain in the Revolutionary War. Lakeshore Road was established and Colonel Smith cleared part of the forest and built his house near the mouth of Etobicoke Creek in 1799.

Throughout most of the 19th century, the land was agricultural. In the early 1900s, the land along the Lake Ontario shoreline and at the mouth of the creek was subdivided into lots for summer cottages, some of which were built on stilts to protect against frequent flooding along the floodplain. At this time, the creek had two channels surrounding an island just upstream from the mouth of the creek. When the channels met below the island, the creek then did a sharp 90-degree turn before reaching Lake Ontario. The sharp bend in the creek formed a beach bar between the creek and the lake. Both the island and the bar were used by cottagers.

By the late 1940s, there were at least 277 residences in what was called the "Etobicoke Flats". Just to the west of the flats, within today's Lakeshore Park, was a small arms manufacturing company that was constructed during World War II. After its closure in 1976, the property was turned over to the Canada Post Corporation and used as a distribution centre. The office complex and the water tower remain of the buildings on the site, at the foot of Dixie Road.

Etobicoke Creek flooded badly on March 16, 1948, forcing the rescue of 110 families. The Long Branch village assessor stated that the homes should be condemned, but would not be due to the lack of replacement housing. This prompted the then Etobicoke River Conservation Authority to make an offer to purchase houses in the area to develop a park with flood controls. Local residents refused to sell. The mouth of Etobicoke Creek was altered in 1949 through the building of the Long Branch Diversion Channel that removed the 90-degree bend and allowed creek water and ice to flow in a straight path into Lake Ontario. Even so, in 1952, an ice jam in the river occurred and destroyed some houses on the flats.

In 1954, Hurricane Hazel hit the Greater Toronto Area (GTA) and within 24 hours, 28 centimetres (11 in) of rain fell, leading to the death of seven area residents and the destruction of at least 56 residences (numbers for the GTA as a whole were much higher). New flood protection measures led to the government expropriation of 164 properties (at a cost of CA$800,000 ($9.32 million in 2025 dollars)) near the mouth of Etobicoke Creek and the removal of cottages on the flats. The western channel of the creek and the area north of the sand bar was filled in except for a small pond in the area of the west channel. All structures on the sandbar, Island Road and 43rd Street were removed. 43rd Street south of Lake Shore Boulevard and Lakeshore Promenade west of 42nd Street were closed and converted into parkland.

Marie Curtis Park opened in 1959. The park was named after Marie Curtis, the then-Reeve of Long Branch for her contributions to municipal service in Long Branch and Metropolitan Toronto.

In 1992, the TRCA purchased the 15 hectares (37 acres) lands (the "Arsenal Lands") of the adjoining former arms factory along Lakeshore Road, with the intent of expanding the amount of parkland at the site. As part of the sale, both TRCA and Canada Post spent CA$2.5 million for soil remediation. The TRCA has developed a master plan, and done remediation efforts on the land since then. 70,000 tonnes of contaminated soil was removed and a containment facility for low-level radioactive waste was constructed at a cost of CA$1.6 million. Development of the Arsenal Lands is ongoing. Park development costs were estimated in 2005 at CA$3 million.

=== Gay cruising ===
The park has developed a reputation as a "gay cruising" location. The activities in the park have attracted police attention on several occasions. Two gay men were arrested in the park in 1982 for indecent assault and indecent exposure. The two were found not guilty. In 2016, the Toronto Police Service conducted a sting operation known as "Project Marie" in the park. The operation arrested 76 men and two women for a total of 89 by-law infractions, including indecent exposure and engaging in sexual activity. A community event held weeks later, entitled "Take Back The Park", organized by Mississauga Councillor Jim Tovey, on the site where police alleged men had been engaging in public sexual activity, was crashed by members of Toronto's LGBTQ community. The LGBTQ community compared the sting to 1980s bath-house raids. A group of lawyers offered their services free of charge to fight the tickets. A year later, tickets issued to a dozen men were withdrawn. The Toronto Police Service denied the operation was homophobic, but rather "it was an attempt to respond to complaints from some residents about public nudity, indecent exposure and drug and alcohol consumption in the park".

== See also ==
- Lakeview Waterfront Connection - new park being created to the west in Mississauga.

== Bibliography ==
- Guy, Katrina (2005). "50 Years Later...Hurricane Hazel's Legacy at the mouth of Etobicoke Creek" (PDF). Creek Time. 7 (1, Spring).
- Harrison, Michael (2010). "Lost Creeks of South Etobicoke".
- Region of Peel Planning Department (2011). "DIXIE – LAKESHORE (MARIE CURTIS PARK & AREA)" (PDF).
