= Lakeview, Ontario =

Lakeview, Ontario may refer to:

- Lakeview, Elgin County, Ontario
- Lakeview, Mississauga, Ontario
- Lakeview, Simcoe County, Ontario
