= Vincent Massey Public School =

Vincent Massey Public School can refer to:

- Vincent Massey Public School (Toronto)
- Vincent Massey Public School (Ottawa)
- Vincent Massey Public School (Bowmanville)
- Vincent Massey Public School (North Bay)
- Vincent Massey Public School (Lively) Closed 1983
