= Long Branch, Toronto =

Long Branch
- Neighbourhood
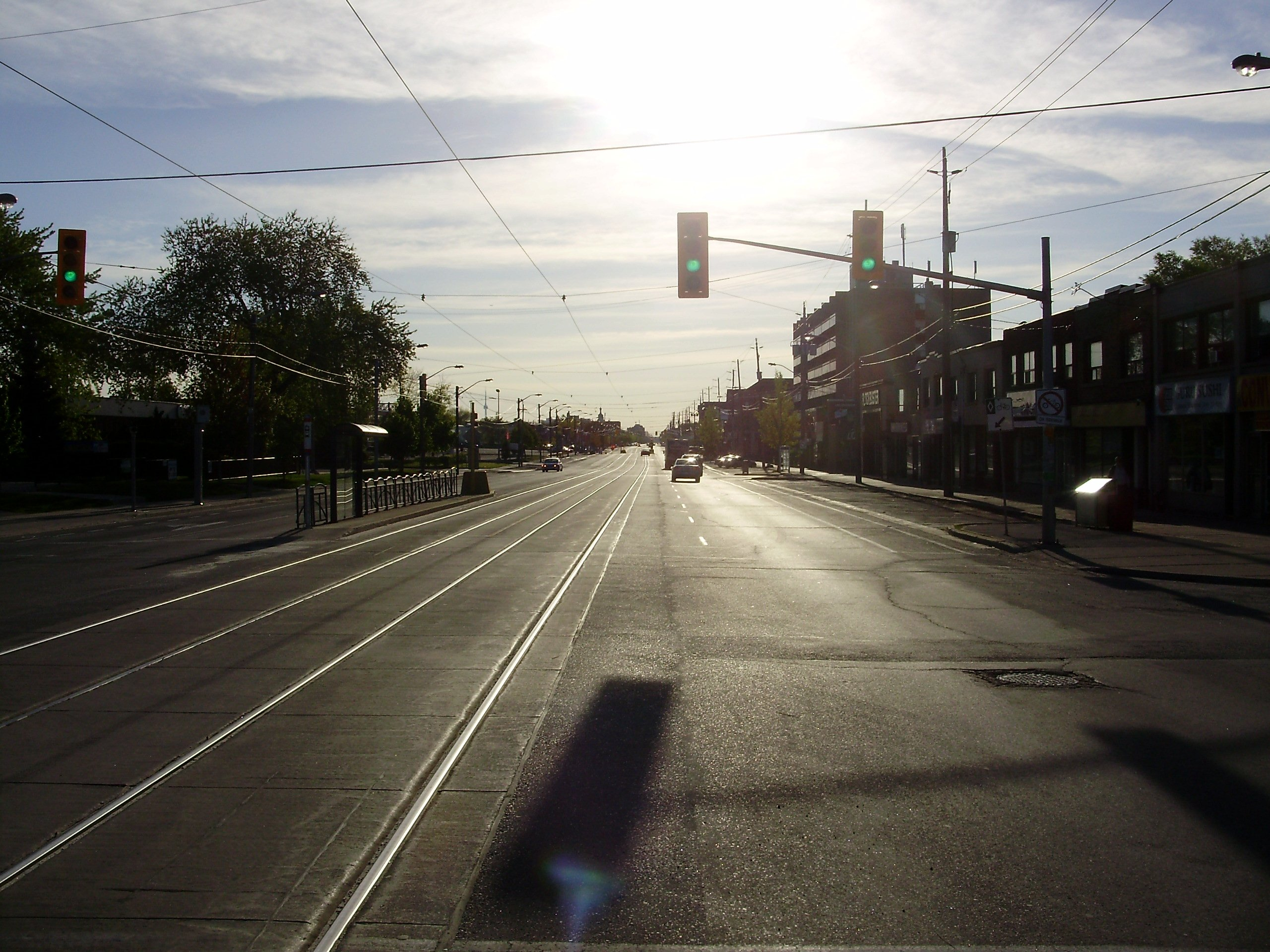
- View of Long Branch from Lake Shore Boulevard

- Location within Toronto
- Coordinates: 43°35′29″N 79°31′57″W
- Country: Canada
- Province: Ontario
- City: Toronto
- Established: 1850 Etobicoke Township
- Developed: 1884 (Subdivision) 'Sea Breeze Park'; 1886, "Long Branch Park"; 1891 (Postal village)
- Incorporated: 1931 (Village)
- Joined: 1953 Metro Toronto

Government
  - MP: James Maloney (Etobicoke—Lakeshore)
  - MPP: Lee Fairclough (Etobicoke—Lakeshore)
  - Councillor: Amber Morley (Ward 3 Etobicoke—Lakeshore)

Long Branch is a neighbourhood and former municipality in the south-west of Toronto, Ontario, Canada. It is located in the south-western corner of the former Township (and later, City) of Etobicoke on the shore of Lake Ontario. The Village of Long Branch was a partially independent municipality from 1930 to 1967. Long Branch is located within a land grant from the government to Colonel Samuel Smith in the late 18th century. After Smith's death, a small portion of it was developed as a summer resort in the late 1800s.

== Character ==
Long Branch is primarily a residential district, composed mostly of single-family, detached homes. Along Lake Shore Boulevard West, numerous business are located in a low-rise commercial strip. South of Lake Shore Boulevard West, the area of single-family homes extends down to the lake. The area's lakeshore is primarily privately owned, except for Long Branch Park and Marie Curtis Park.

Long Branch's population in 2011 was 9,625, a decline from 10,365 in 2001. The population has a higher proportion of working-age persons and lower proportions of children and seniors compared to the City of Toronto average. 65% of Long Branch persons indicate English as their mother tongue, with 31% having neither English or French to be the mother tongue of the household. The largest non-official language mother tongue is Polish at 6.3%, or 605 persons. The population has been relatively stable for several decades. The population of the Village of Long Branch was 9,616 in 1955.

== Boundaries ==
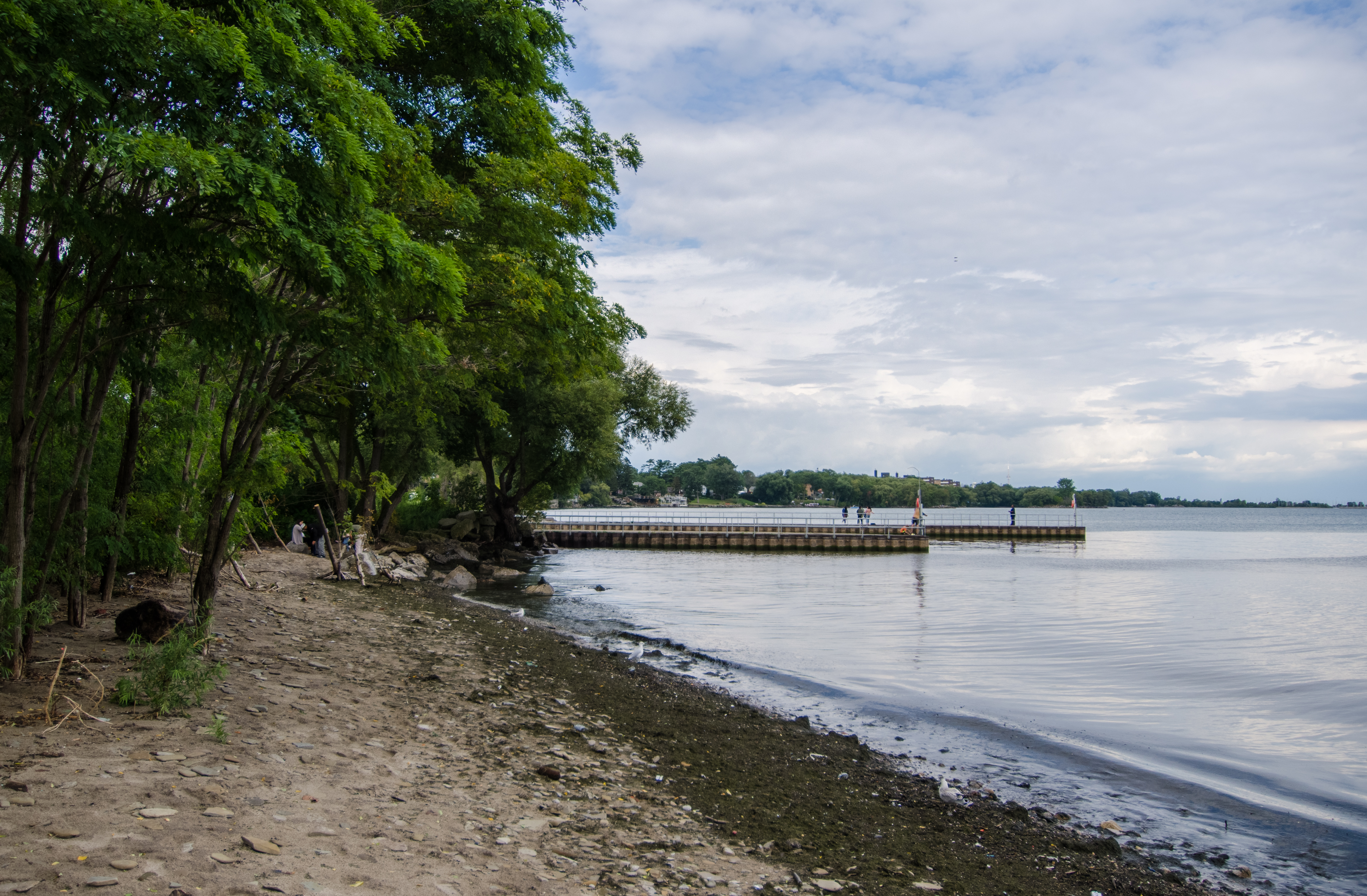
Marie Curtis Park is a municipal park at western boundary of Long Branch. The park is situated along Etobicoke Creek.

Long Branch is bounded by Lake Ontario on the south, with western boundaries of Etobicoke Creek north of Lake Shore Blvd. West and the western property line of the Canadian Arsenals Ltd. (Small Arms Ltd., WWII) (now within Marie Curtis Park) south of Lakeshore Road in Mississauga. The northern boundary is the Canadian National Railway's mainline, with the eastern boundaries being Twenty-Third Street south of Lake Shore Blvd. West, and the midpoint between Twenty-Second and Twenty-Fourth Streets north of Lake Shore Blvd. West.

== History ==
Federal census population history of Long Branch
Year	Pop.	±%
1931	3,962	—
1941	5,172	+30.5%
1951	8,727	+68.7%
1956	10,249	+17.4%
1961	11,039	+7.7%
1966	12,980	+17.6%
Source: Statistics Canada

Before Long Branch became a village, it was the home to Loyalist Col. Sam Smith, who was one of the earliest settlers in Etobicoke. His cabin was located near Etobicoke Creek and survived into the 1950s. Col. Smith was granted a large tract of land for his service in the Queen's Rangers in 1797, which eventually extended from what is now Kipling Avenue to the original course of the Etobicoke River (now Creek), and south of Bloor Street to Lake Ontario after Col. Smith acquired additional parcels of land. The southern portion of this tract would include all of Long Branch and the westernmost portion of New Toronto, south of the railway line.

The property was bought by James Eastwood from Col. Sam Smith's son, Samuel Bois Smith, in 1871. In 1883 Eastwood sold a portion of his land south of Lake Shore Road (now, Boulevard West) to a small group of financiers from Toronto. It was to be developed as a summer resort called 'Sea Breeze Park', and a plan of subdivision was filed in 1884. In 1886, the site was acquired by Thomas Wilkie and his brother and it was renamed 'Long Branch Park', after the seaside summer resort area of Long Branch, New Jersey where Thomas had vacationed. The central north–south street was originally named 'Sea Breeze Avenue', but was renamed as 'Long Branch Avenue'.

In 1887, the 'Long Branch Hotel' was built, set back from the waterfront near Beach Road (now Lake Promenade) and Long Branch Avenue. It survived until 1958 when it was destroyed by fire. In 1891, the Long Branch post office was opened to serve the Long Branch Park summer resort. Beginning in 1910, Colonel Frederick Burton Robbins bought land from the Newborn, Appleby, Van Every Estates and other lots south of Lake Shore Road around Long Branch Park and began to subdivide The Heathy Home Lots were called 'Pine Beach' 'The Pines' 'Lakeshore Gardens' and 'Lakeshore Gardens Annex'. In the 1920s, the land surrounding the mouth of Etobicoke Creek, known as the "Etobicoke Flats", was sub-divided for cottages and housing.

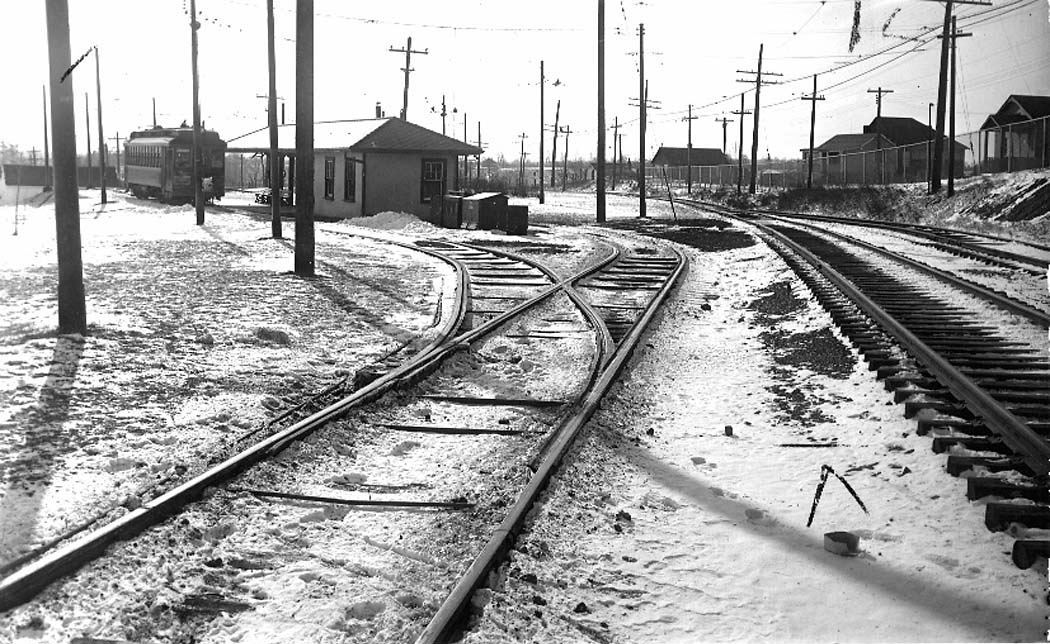
View of Long Branch Loop, 1935. Opened in 1895, the line was double-tracked in 1928 by the Toronto Transit Commission.

In 1895, the Toronto & Mimico Electric Railway and Light Company radial railway's single-track service was completed along Lake Shore Road from New Toronto through Long Branch to the current location of Long Branch Loop. In 1927, this line was amalgamated by the Toronto Transportation Commission (TTC) and double-tracked in 1928.

In 1915, the Long Branch Aerodrome was established to the west of the village in Toronto Township, today's Mississauga. The aerodrome was Canada's first and was operated by the Curtiss Flying School until 1917.

In 1924, the Long Branch Racetrack was inaugurated just north of the town at Horner Avenue at Kipling. It was operated by the Orpen family until 1955 when it was sold. The track was closed and racing moved north to Woodbine Racetrack. Today's Canadian International Stakes was initially called the Long Branch championship and run at Long Branch. The Cup and Saucer Stakes also originated at Long Branch.

The Village of Long Branch was incorporated in 1930, after the other lakeshore municipalities of Mimico (1917) and New Toronto (1920) were incorporated as towns. After the incorporation, some of its streets were given new names. In 1931, north–south street names were standardized by continuing the ordinal numbers of New Toronto's streets, picking-up at Twenty-Third Street in the east through to Forty-Third Street in the west. For example; Lansdowne Avenue became Thirty-Third Street and Lake View Avenue became Thirty-Fifth Street. Long Branch Avenue has remained the same (it could have been Thirty-Fourth St.). Thirty-Seventh St. was formerly called Robert Street, after Robert Eastwood. Today, a drugstore is located at the corner of Thirty-Seventh St. and Lake Shore Blvd. West on the site of the former Eastwood Park Hotel, which originally was the homestead built by Robert Eastwood on the occasion of his marriage to Elizabeth McGregor in 1911. Robert Eastwood died in 1925, and his widow, "Lizzie" sold the property and homestead to Paul and May Laurent of Church Street (now Royal York Road) Mimico. Following the abolition of Prohibition, Paul and May obtained a liquor licence from the province of Ontario and opened what would become a 25-room hotel with dining room and beverage rooms which would serve the people of Long Branch for 60 years until the Laurent family sold the business and property in 1987. Today, other local streets such as James Street still bear names of members of the Eastwood family. Twenty-third Street was called Government Road even after the 1931 incorporation.

A cenotaph was raised on Long Branch Avenue south of Lake Shore in 1933 to commemorate the village's contributions during the First (and later, Second) World War. During the Second World War, many industries were opened between Lake Shore Road and the railway to the north as part of the Commonwealth war effort. The Small Arms Limited Long Branch Arsenal munitions factory was established during World War II to the west of the village, just north of the Aerodrome's location.

In October 1954, Hurricane Hazel was particularly destructive in Toronto, as a result of a combination of a lack of experience in dealing with tropical storms and the storm's unexpected retention of power. Hazel had travelled 1,100 km (680 mi) over land, but while approaching Canada, it had merged with an existing powerful cold front. The storm stalled over the Greater Toronto Area, and although it was now extratropical, it remained as powerful as a category 1 hurricane. To help with the cleanup, 800 members of the military were summoned, and a Hurricane Relief Fund was established that distributed $5.1 million (2009: $41.7 million) in aid.

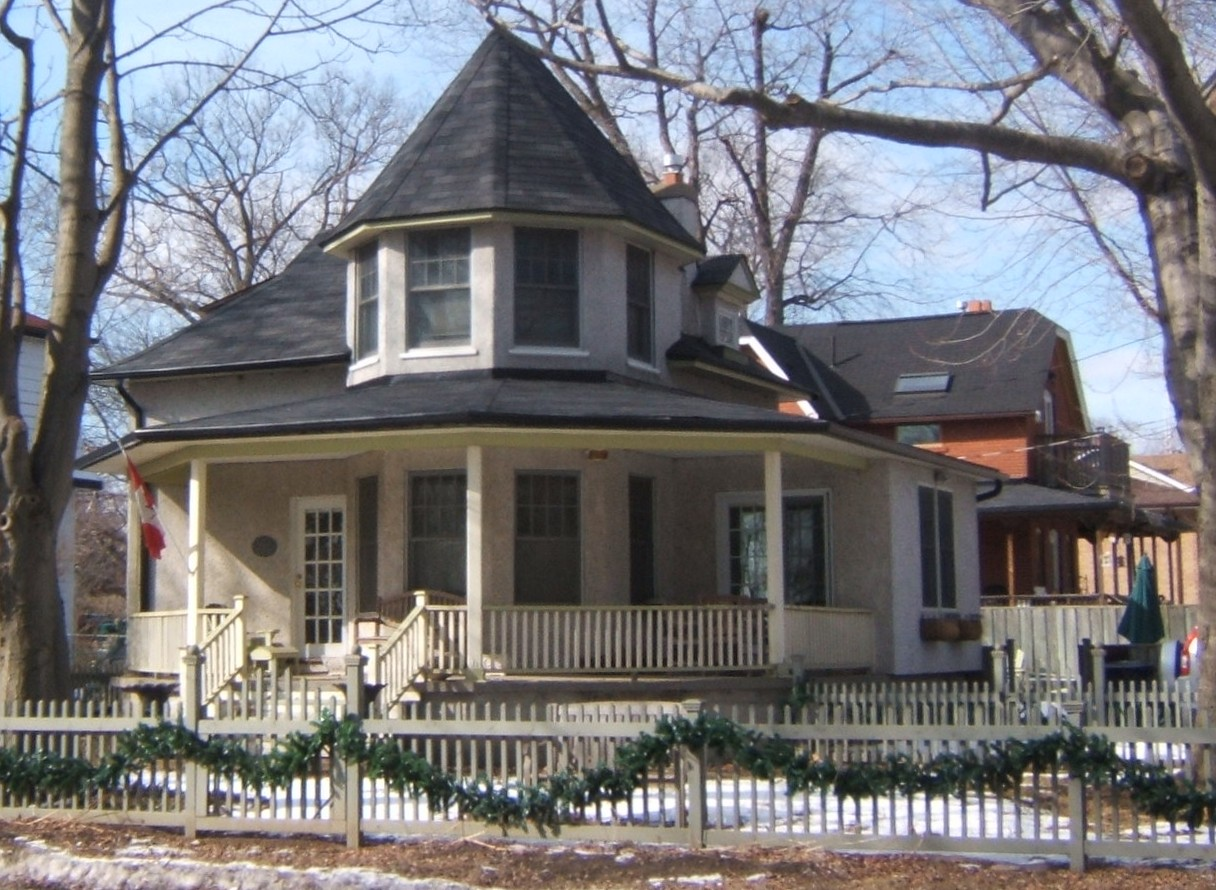
An example of a cottage built in the late-19th and early 20th century. A number of cottages and beach houses were destroyed in 1954, as a result of Hurricane Hazel.

More than forty homes in Long Branch were lost at the mouth of the Etobicoke Creek due to flooding caused by Hurricane Hazel. Long Branch's dead from the hurricane were: Mr and Mrs Ed Crymble and their daughter Clifford; Patricia and Robert Thorpe; and Mrs. Thorpe's mother, Mrs. Robert Johnston. The Thorpe's baby daughter Nancy survived. The baby had been handed to 17-year-old Sylvia Jones while the area was being abandoned. Jones climbed onto a nearby roof and the two were later saved by fire fighters. The Thorpe's house was one of the ones washed away into Lake Ontario. Nancy Thorpe was later adopted by her aunt and uncle. The O'Farrell family escaped when their house floated down the river, by climbing onto trees that their house crashed into. Thirty-five persons survived on the roof of one house that was held back from Lake Ontario by two trees the house had crashed into. According to Long Branch Reeve Marie Curtis, "if it hadn't been for the trees, which held the houses back, half of them would have been swept out into the lake." 147 cottages at the mouth were declared unfit for habitation after the flooding when sanitation facilities broke down.

To prevent any future floods from having similar disastrous results, cottages and houses from the floodplain, the sand bar and around the mouth of the river were removed and the area was turned into parkland. In 1959, the park was named for village Reeve Marie Curtis in recognition for her longstanding municipal service and her efforts to have the park built. A trailer park north of Lakeshore Road, Pleasant Valley Trailer Park, was also destroyed when flooding caused a dike to break. The trailer park is now the site of Maurice J. Breen Park.

Forty-Third Street, along the eastern bank of Etobicoke Creek, was closed up and only a stub north of Lake Shore Boulevard exists. West of Etobicoke Creek and south of Lakeshore Road is Island Road, which today is an access road for parking and a boat launch for Marie Curtis Park. It was built in the early 20th century to serve the sub-division built on the banks of the Etobicoke Creek and an island within the channel of the creek. As part of the park development, the island of Island Road became part of the west bank of Etobicoke Creek, as the western channel was filled in. At the same time, a sand bar at the mouth was connected to shore by fill. The sand bar is Marie Curtis Beach today. Etobicoke Creek originally turned at a right-angle to the west at the shore, but now is channelled straight out to the lake. A new section of Island Road was built to connect to Lakeshore Road to the north, as its prior connection to Forty-Third Street on the eastern bank was closed.

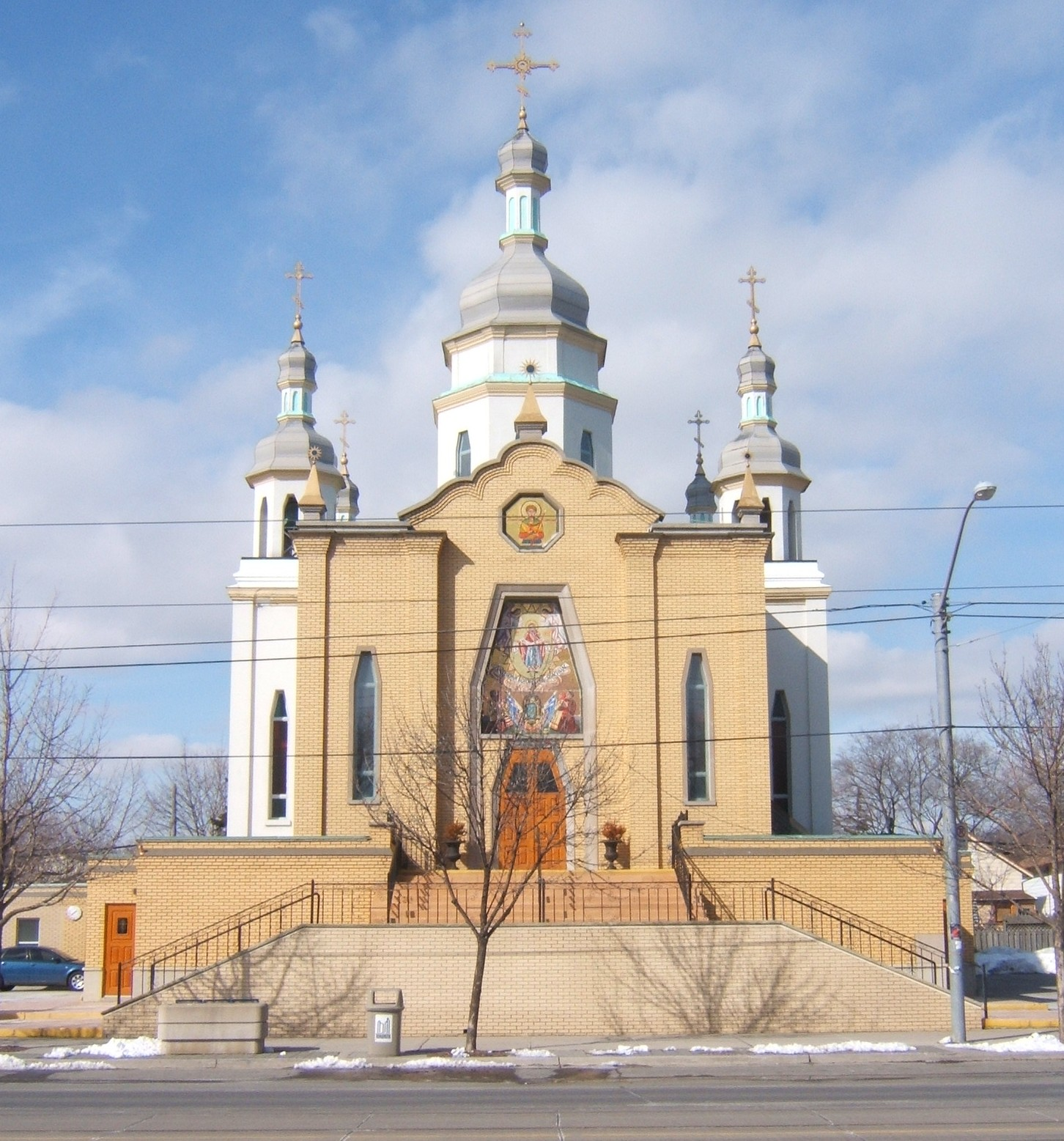
St. Demetrius Ukrainian Orthodox Church was built in Long Branch in 1958.

After World War II, an influx of immigrants from Europe came to Toronto. One of the largest Orthodox churches in Canada, St. Demetrius Ukrainian Orthodox Church (not to be confused with St Demetrius Byzantine Rite Catholic church, also in Etobicoke), was built on Lake Shore Road (now Blvd. West) opposite 27th Street in 1958.

In 1967, the Village of Long Branch was amalgamated with the Township of Etobicoke to form the Borough of Etobicoke. That year, the new GO Transit commuter train service was established and the Long Branch GO Station was built next to Long Branch Loop, connecting Long Branch west to Oakville and east to downtown Toronto. The Borough became the City of Etobicoke in 1984. In 1998, Etobicoke was merged with five other municipalities and the Metropolitan Toronto government to form the new City of Toronto.

In the late 1980s, some industry started to relocate out of Long Branch. Lake Shore Boulevard West today is a major thoroughfare and business strip in transition, with plans, some controversial, to change its character from a low-density industrial-commercial corridor to higher-density residential uses including some limited commercial space.

=== Historical sites ===
These sites are located on the former Federal Government lands, located south of Lakeview and west of Long Branch, in Mississauga.

==== Small Arms Limited, Long Branch Arsenal ====
Adjacent to the western boundary of Marie Curtis Park (now Marie Curtis Park West) in Toronto Township is the former Small Arms Limited Long Branch Arsenal site. The Federal Government had owned the lands south of Lake Shore Road, between the Etobicoke River to just west of Cawthra Road, from the late 1800s into the early 20th century.

The Ordnance Branch of the Department of National Defense authorized the construction of the factory in 1940. After transfer to the Department of Munitions and Supply, a Crown Corporation, Small Arms Ltd. was formed to operate the facility. By June 1941, the first five rifles had been produced. Huge quantities of British-pattern military small arms were manufactured there during the Second World War, including the No.4 MkI* Lee–Enfield bolt-action rifle, and the Sten submachine-gun (or machine-carbine). Small Arms Ltd. ceased operations at the end of December 1945. Beginning January 1, 1946, operations continued as the Small Arms Division, Canadian Arsenals Limited. The factory was closed June 30, 1976. The property was later used by Canada Post as a distribution centre.

The factory complex was demolished and the "Arsenal Lands" are now slated to become part of Marie Curtis Park West. The buildings of the office complex at the foot of Dixie Road have been saved for public use, while only the water tower remains from the factory complex.

==== Long Branch Aerodrome ====
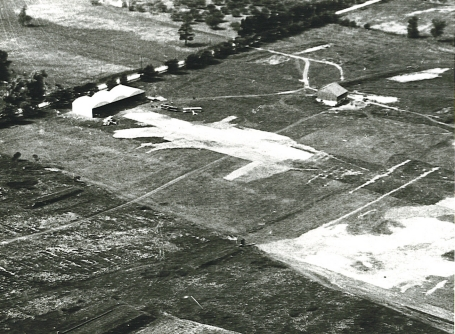
Long Branch Aerodrome was an airfield in Long Branch, that operated from 1915 to 1919.

The Long Branch Aerodrome was located west of Long Branch on the Federal Government lands in Toronto Township (today's Mississauga). The aerodrome was situated on a 100-acre property on Lakeshore Road just west of Dixie Road. The Long Branch Aerodrome has the distinction of being the first airport in Canada and home to Canada's first aviator training school. It opened on May 20, 1915, by Curtiss Aeroplanes and Motors Company for the Royal Flying Corps. Aircraft such as the JN-4 (Canadian) "Canuck" soon became a common sight at the airfield, which included three aircraft hangars.

In January 1917, the newly designated Royal Flying Corps, Canada, a forerunner to the Royal Canadian Air Force, opened the RFC Training Centre at Long Branch. The Long Branch training centre also provided instruction on flying boats at nearby Hanlon's Point in Toronto Harbour, the first seaplane base in Canada. By July 1917, the flight school re-located to the Armour Heights Aerodrome. Long Branch became the Cadet Ground Training School for the Royal Flying Corps. Both the school and the aerodrome closed in 1919. During World War II, the former aerodrome served initially as 21 Non-permanent Active Militia Training centre and then as an army small arms training centre. After the war, the Lakeview Armoury was established on the site, but was demolished in the 1950s.

Not the slightest trace remains of the airfield today. From 1958 to 2005, the waterfront portion of the property was the location of Ontario Power Generation's Lakeview Generating Station. In September 1969, a plaque was erected at the site to commemorate Canada's first Aerodrome.

== Education ==
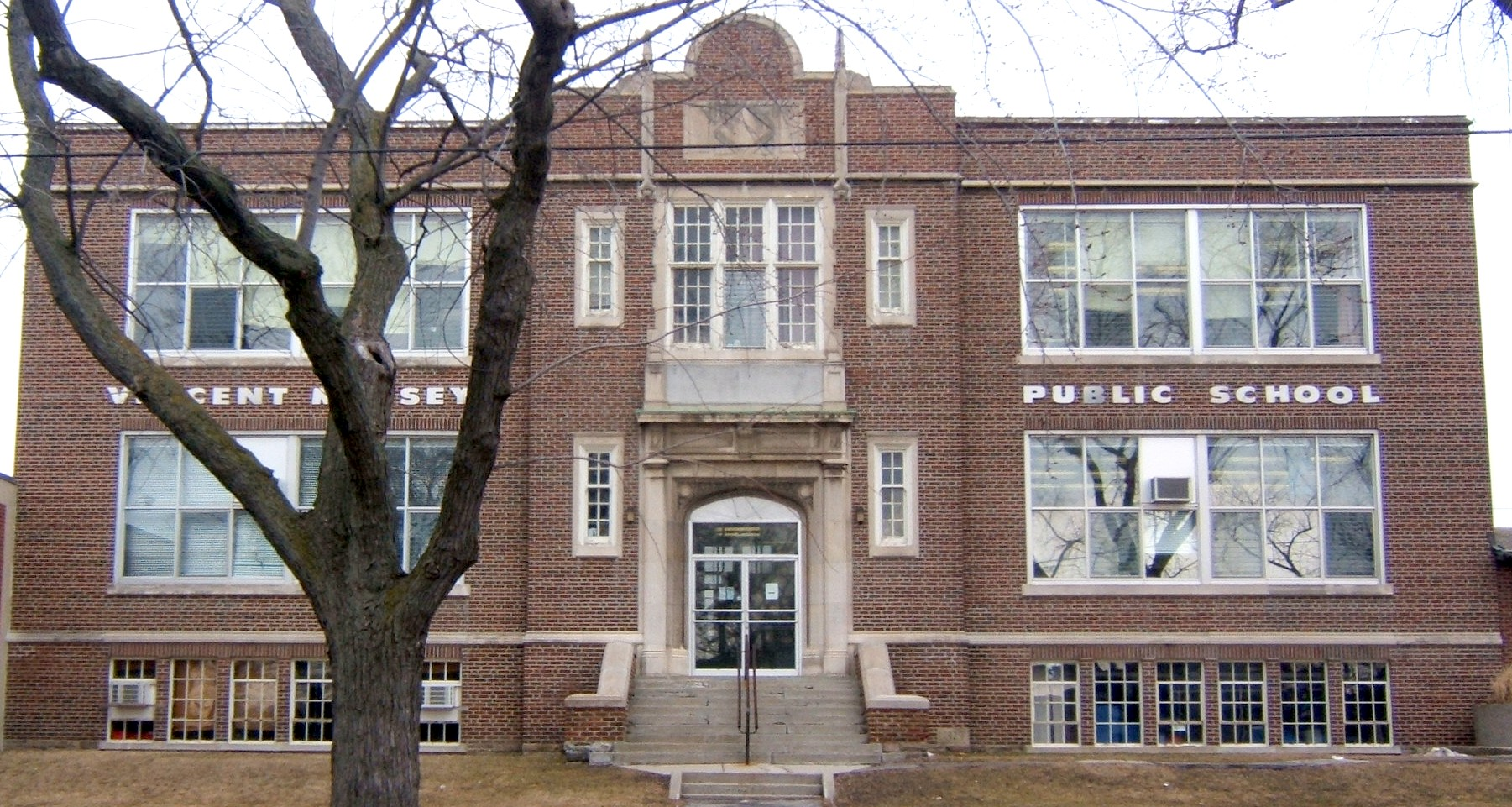
Vincent Massey Public School was an elementary school in Long Branch.

Two public school board operates schools in Long Branch, the English first language Toronto District School Board, and the French first language Conseil scolaire Viamonde (CVS). Both school boards operate one institution in Long Branch, which provides primary education. They include:

- École élémentaire Micheline-Saint-Cyr (CSV)
- James S. Bell Junior Middle School (TDSB)

Vincent Massey Public School was formerly another elementary school operated by TDSB. Operating from 1929 to 1983, the building is presently used as a daycare and Nursery.

Long Branch was previously home to one public school operated by the Toronto Catholic District School Board (TCDSB), Christ the King Catholic School. However, in February 2018, the school was amalgamated along with St Theresa Catholic School into a new school in neighbouring New Toronto, known as The Holy Trinity Catholic School. The school is located east of Father John Redmond Catholic Secondary School, a secondary school adjacent to Long Branch's eastern boundary.

== Transportation ==
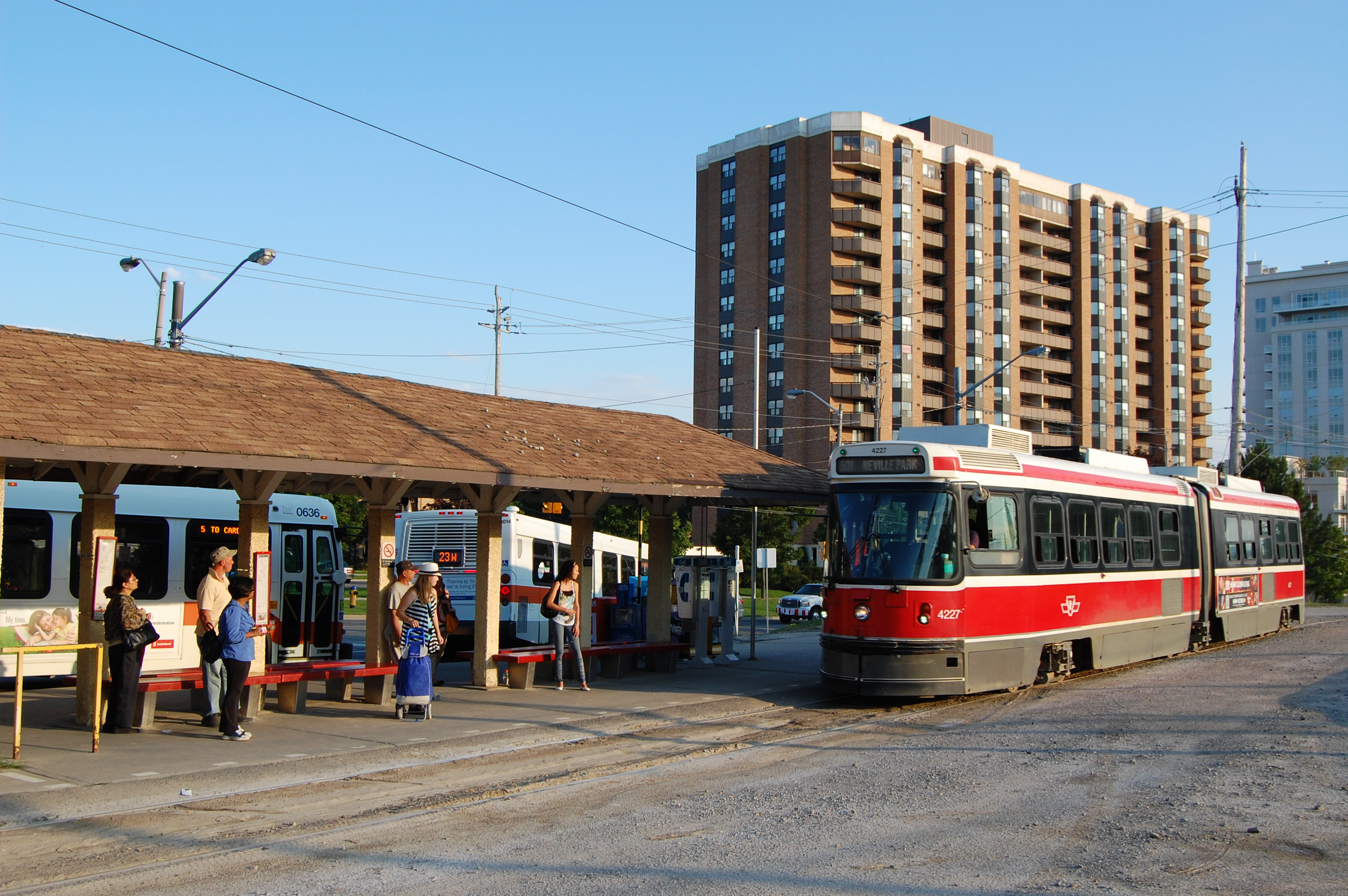
The western terminus for 501 Queen and 508 Lake Shore TTC streetcar lines is located in the neighbourhood, at Long Branch Loop.

The Long Branch Loop is the western terminus for the 501 Queen and 508 Lake Shore TTC streetcar lines, connecting Long Branch to downtown Toronto. The Loop is also the terminus for the 110 Islington South and 123 Shorncliffe TTC bus lines. The MiWay Mississauga transit agency operates the 5 Dixie and 23 Lakeshore from the Loop west into Mississauga. Next to the loop is the Long Branch GO Station on the GO Transit Lakeshore West line.

The major east–west arterial road in Long Branch is Lake Shore Boulevard, which connects to the east to downtown Toronto. Lake Shore Boulevard West continues to the west as Lakeshore Road in Mississauga. The generally used north–south arterial roads are Brown's Line and Kipling Avenue, neither of which is within Long Branch (except a few metres at the southern end of Brown's Line, south of the railway tracks). Since there are no major north–south roads in Long Branch, these exterior roads are used to reach the Gardiner Expressway, Ontario Highway 427 and the Queen Elizabeth Way highways to the north.

== Institutions ==
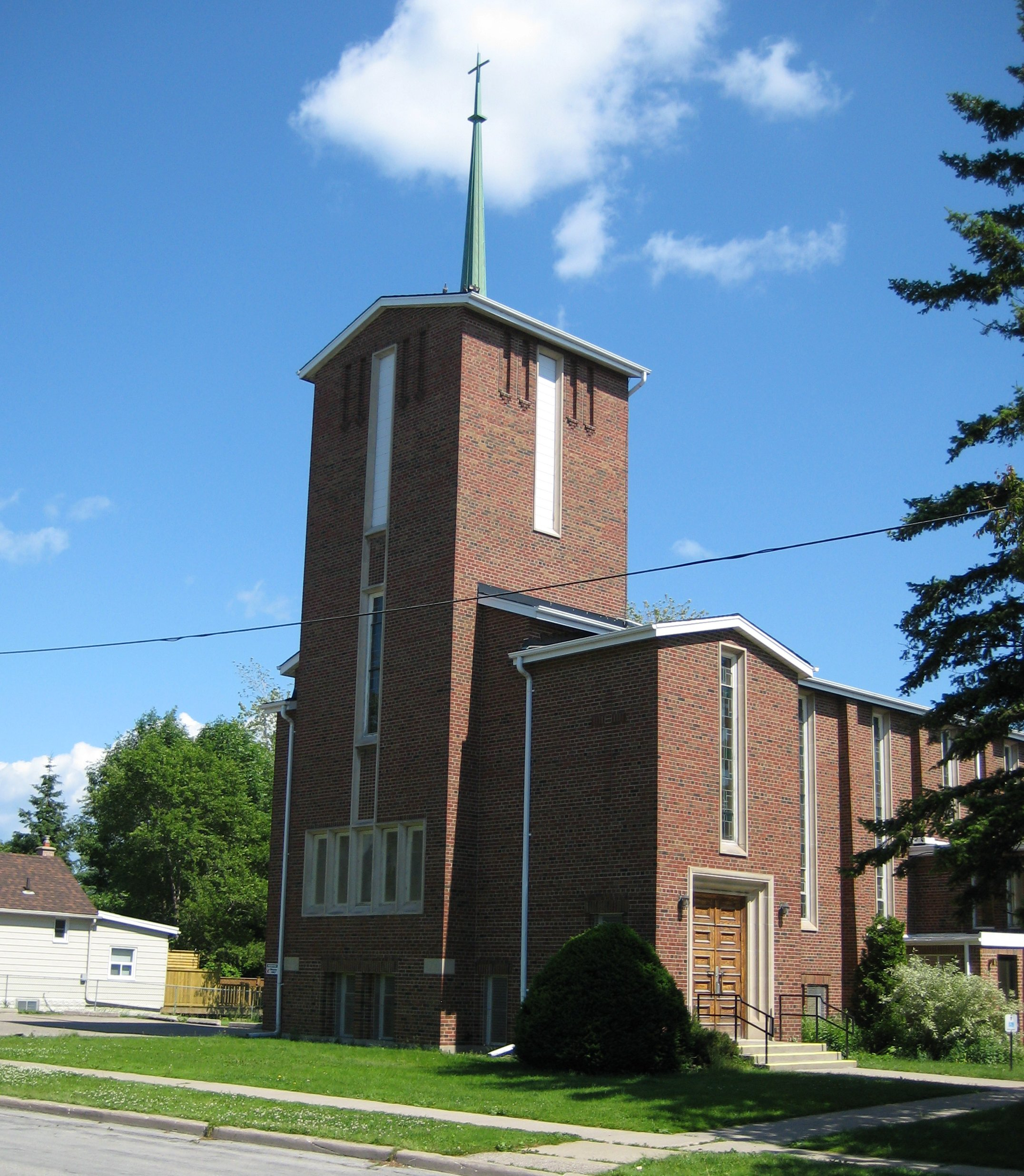
St. Pauls United Church is one of several churches in Long Branch.

=== Churches ===
- Christ the King Roman Catholic Church
- Long Branch Baptist Church
- St Agnes Anglican Church (founded 1924, closed 2005, building remains, now used as a Polish church)
- St Paul's United Church (founded 1924)
- St James Presbyterian (founded 1914, closed 2001)
- St. Demetrius Ukrainian Orthodox Church (1956)
- Polish Full Gospel Church

=== Notable local businesses, current and historical ===
- Castrol Oils
- Chrysler Canada Etobicoke casting
- Neptune Meters (closed)
- Gabriel Shock Absorbers, later Arvin Industries (closed)
- Pittsburgh Paints (closed)

=== Points of interest ===
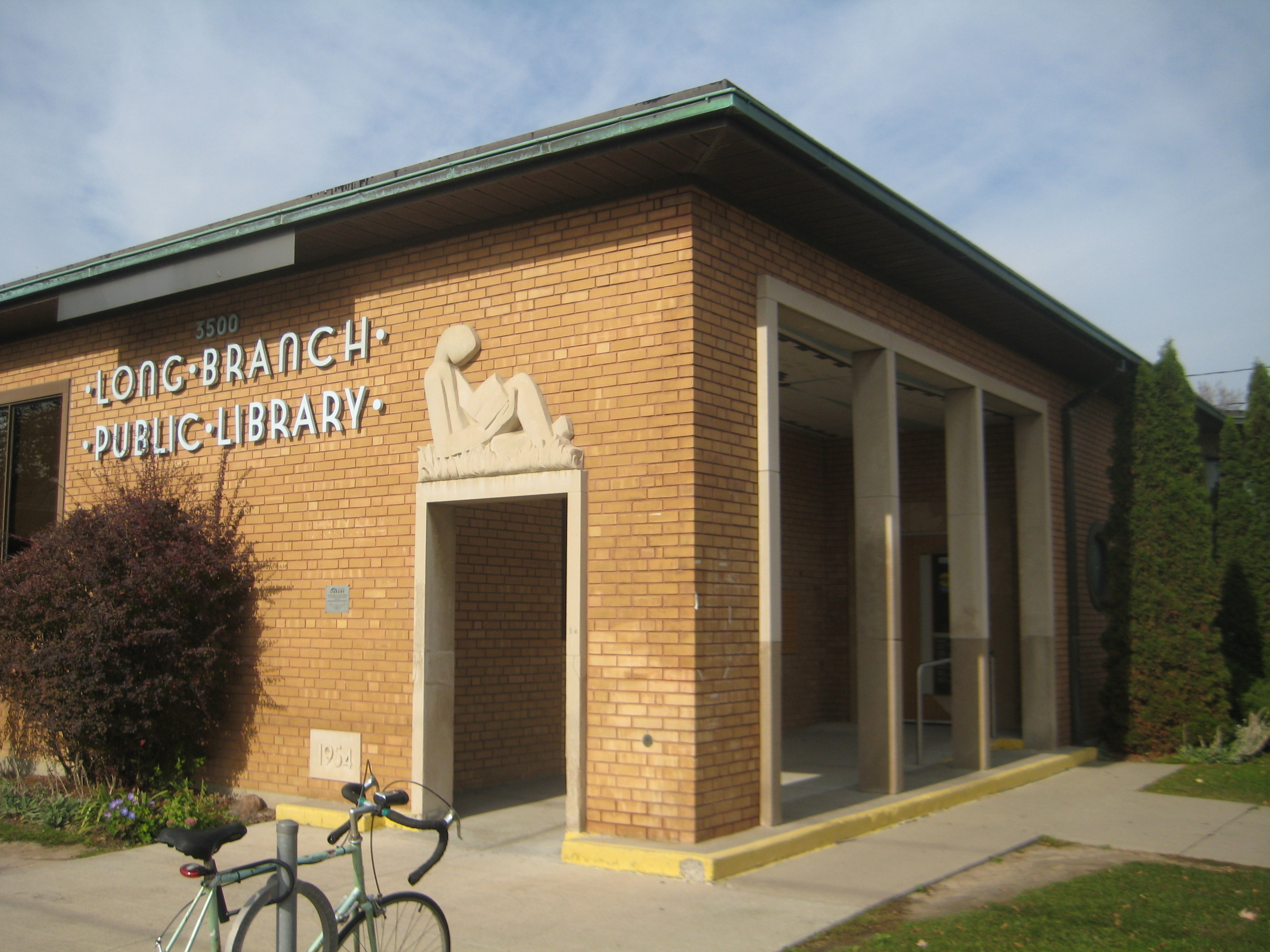
The Long Branch branch of the Toronto Public Library is situated in the neighbourhood.

- Long Branch Centennial Arena
- Long Branch Public Library
- Marie Curtis Park

== Notable persons ==
=== Politicians ===
- Laurel Broten, former Liberal M.P.P., Minister of the Environment & Minister of Education
- Ruth Grier, former NDP M.P.P., Minister of the Environment & Minister of Health
- Terry Grier, former NDP M.P. and educator
- Doug Holyday, former Progressive Conservative M.P.P., former deputy mayor of City of Toronto, former mayor of City of Etobicoke
- Michael Ignatieff, former Liberal M.P. & leader of the Liberal Party of Canada
- Col. Sam Smith, British Loyalist military officer and administrator of Upper Canada

=== Reeves ===
- 1931–1932, 1934-1936 John Shannon
- 1933 Robert A. Westbrook
- 1937 Joseph C. Deyman
- 1938–1941, 1944 Samuel Thomas Wright, previously Conservative MPP for Dovercourt (1926–1934)
- 1942-1943 John Ord (Jack) Elton - general manager for a supermarket chain
- 1945–1947, 1951-1953 Thomas F. Carter - In 1954, ran for the federal Progressive Conservative nomination for York West but was defeated by John Borden Hamilton who went on to win the by-election
- 1948-1950 Lawrence Iles - owned a butcher shop
- 1954-1962 Marie Curtis - only woman to become reeve of Long Branch. She and Dorothy Hague were the first women reeves or mayors in the Toronto area.
- 1963-1964 Leonard E. Ford - advocated the merger of Long Branch with Mimico and New Toronto rather than amalgamation of Metro Toronto.
- 1965-1966 Thomas Berry - grew up in a London orphanage as his merchant seaman father was unable to care for him. Berry, himself, joined the British Merchant Navy when he was 15 and was torpedoed three times during World War II. After the war he trained as a steamfitter and then moved to Canada with his wife and child, settling in Long Branch in 1947. He also crusaded to save a local school from demolition, it reopened in 1970 as the Thomas Berry Daycare Centre. On Metro Toronto Council, he successfully fought against plans to tear down Toronto's Old City Hall.

=== Artists ===
- Barbara Howard

== See also ==
- List of neighbourhoods in Toronto
