= Francis Gore =

Canadian politician

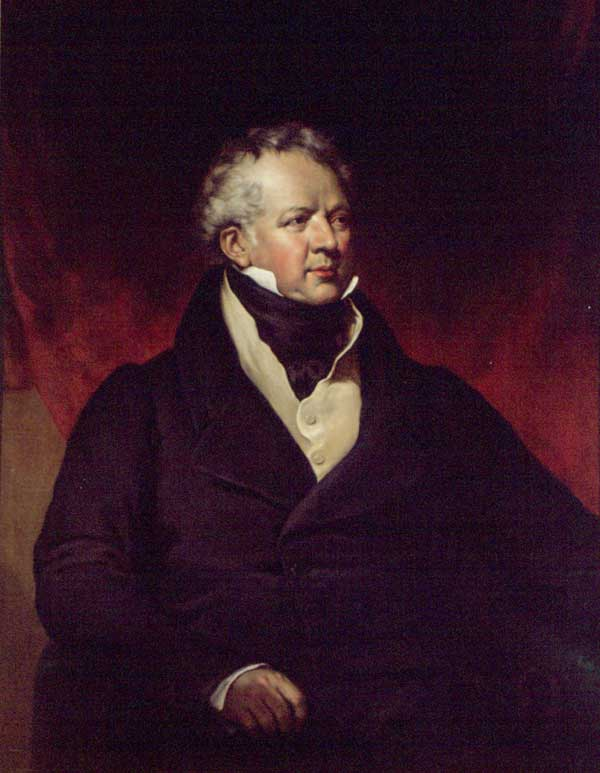
- Portrait by George Theodore Berthon

Lieutenant Governor of Upper Canada
- In office 1806–1817
- Monarch: George III
- Governors General: (Lieutenant Governor of Lower Canada as Governor-in-Chief over the British North America); Thomas Dunn (administrator); Sir James Henry Craig; Sir George Prevost _{Bt} Sir Gordon Drummond; Sir John Coape Sherbrooke
- Preceded by: Peter Hunter
- Succeeded by: Sir Peregrine Maitland

Governor of Bermuda
- In office 1805–1806
- Monarch: George III
- Preceded by: George Beckwith; Henry Tucker (acting)
- Succeeded by: Henry Tucker (acting); John Hodgson

Personal details
- Born: 1769 Blackheath, London, England
- Died: 3 November 1852 (aged 82–83) Brighton, England

Francis Gore (1769 – 3 November 1852) was an English military officer and British colonial administrator in Bermuda and Upper Canada.

Gore was born in Blackheath, London, England in 1769 the son of Francis Gore and Caroline Beresford. Francis Gore senior was also a soldier and colonial administrator. Gore Sr became a governor of the West Indies in 1763. He had served in the Portuguese campaign of 1761 as aide-de-camp to Queen Charlotte's brother.

Gore was commissioned as an ensign into the 44th Foot in 1787 directly from school at Durham, advancing in 1793 to lieutenant. Gore transferred to the 54th Foot in 1794 and the 17th Light Dragoons in 1795. He retired with the rank of major and became Governor of Bermuda from 1805 to 1806, and then Lieutenant-Governor of Upper Canada from 1806 to 1811. Gore's administration built roads, reorganised the militia and founded schools.

Gore was absent on leave during the War of 1812 while military authorities ran Upper Canada. His stand-in during this time was Isaac Brock, who "sought an active role in the impending war as keenly as Gore sought to escape it".

Gore resumed his role as lieutenant-governor from 1815 to 1817. During his second term, Gore prorogued the Legislative Assembly after it challenged his ban on issuing land grants to American refugees and made other criticisms of his administration. Robert MacIntosh, in his book Earliest Toronto, describes Gore as "a man who was clearly the most incompetent and disliked Lieutenant Governor in the history of Upper Canada". Gore returned to England in 1817 where he became a deputy teller of the Exchequer, a role he held until the offices of the tellers were abolished in 1834.

Gore married Annabella Wentworth, sister of Sir John Wentworth in 1803. They had no children.

Gore died in Brighton, England, on 3 November 1852.

== Legacy ==
Gore Vale, a north–south street on the eastern boundary of Trinity Bellwoods Park on the west side of downtown Toronto. The lands of the park were granted to Captain Samuel Smith in 1806 who named the adjacent ravine "Gore Vale" after him. Most historians believe that the township municipality of Gore, Quebec, was named after him. Meyer's Creek was renamed Belleville by United Empire Loyalist settlers in honour of his wife Lady Annabella Gore in 1816, after their visit to the settlement.

Government offices
| Preceded by Henry Tucker | Governor of Bermuda; 1805–1806 | Succeeded by Henry Tucker |
| Preceded by Alexander Grant | Lieutenant Governor of Upper Canada; 1806–1811 | Succeeded by Sir Isaac Brock |
| Preceded by Gordon Drummond | Lieutenant Governor of Upper Canada; 1815–1817 | Succeeded by Samuel Smith |
