= Alexander Grant (Upper Canada politician) =

Royal Navy officer, merchant and politician

Commodore The Honourable Alexander Grant JP DL

Administrator of Upper Canada
- In office 11 August 1805 – 24 August 1806
- Monarch: George III
- Governor General: Robert Prescott
- Prime Minister: William Pitt the Younger; The Lord Grenville
- Preceded by: Peter Hunter
- Succeeded by: Francis Gore

Lieutenant of Essex County
- In office 23 August 1799 – 8 May 1813
- Monarch: George III

Deputy Superintendent-General of Indian Affairs
- In office 15 January 1799 – 5 March 1799 Serving with Thomas McKee, James Baby
- Preceded by: Alexander McKee
- Succeeded by: William Claus

Member of the Executive Council of Upper Canada
- In office 9 July 1792 – 8 May 1813
- Constituency: York

Member of the Legislative Council of Upper Canada
- In office 12 July 1792 – 8 May 1813
- Constituency: York

Member of the Land Board of the District of Hesse
- In office 1789–1794
- Lieutenant Governor: John Graves Simcoe

Personal details
- Born: 20 May 1734 Glenmoriston, Scotland
- Died: 8 May 1813 (aged 78) Grosse Pointe, Michigan Territory, British North America
- Resting place: St. John's Churchyard, Windsor, Ontario, Canada
- Spouse: Thérèse Barthe (m. 1774; died 1810)
- Children: 11
- Relatives: Clan Grant
- Occupation: Royal Navy officer, businessman, colonial administrator

Military service
- Allegiance: Great Britain; United Kingdom
- Branch/service: British Army; 77th Regiment of Foot (Montgomery's Highlanders); Royal Navy
- Years of service: 1755–1812
- Rank: Commodore-Superintendent
- Commands: Provincial Marine, Great Lakes Command
- Battles/wars: Seven Years' War

Commodore Alexander Grant (20 May 1734 – 8 May 1813) was a Royal Navy officer, merchant, politician, and founder of Grosse Point, Michigan. Grant was born Glenmoriston, Scotland to Isobel and Patrick Grant, 8th Laird of Glenmoriston. During his service with the Royal Navy Grant saw action in the Seven Years' War before becoming a naval superintendent. He then embarked on a career in the ship building industry before losing much of his wealth during the American Revolution. Grant recovered, however, and rose to prominence in civil society, becoming the Administrator of the Government of the Province of Upper Canada in 1805.

== Naval career ==
Grant entered the Royal Navy in 1755 and saw service in British North America, on Lake Champlain, during the Seven Years' War. Grant became a naval superintendent with the Provincial Marine in 1763, with his headquarters on Navy Island on in the Niagara River, before moving to Detroit, Quebec. His headquarters again changed, every winter, during which time the regiment was in New York City, up to 1774.

== Merchant career ==
He began to build his own vessels, essentially selling them to himself at a considerable profit. He built a commercial empire by also selling or renting ships to merchants and this was initially solidified during the American Revolution during which he was given military command of most of the Great Lakes.

However, in the course of the revolution Grant lost much of his income with the loss of 12,000 acres (49 km²) of land he owned in New York, and the end of his participation in private shipping.

== Civil career ==
Grant recovered, however, and rose to prominence in civil society, being appointed a justice of the peace in 1786 and, to a succession of governmental and political positions, in both Upper Canada and Lower Canada, he joined the Executive Council of Upper Canada under Lieutenant-Governor John Graves Simcoe as well as the Legislative Council. In 1799, Grant became a deputy superintendent of the British Indian Department.

In August 1805, Grant became Administrator of Upper Canada, upon the death of Lieutenant-Governor Peter Hunter, and continued Hunter's policies until a new lieutenant governor, Francis Gore, arrived from Britain, in August 1806.

Grant died in 1813 at his home Castle Grant in Grosse Pointe Farms near British-occupied Detroit and was buried on the other side of the Detroit River at St. John's Church in Sandwich, Upper Canada.

Government offices
| Preceded by Peter Hunter | Lieutenant Governor of Upper Canada; 1805–1806 | Succeeded by Francis Gore |
