= List of lieutenant governors of Ontario =

The following is a list of lieutenant governors of Ontario and the lieutenant governors of the former colony of Upper Canada. The office of Lieutenant Governor of Ontario was created in 1867, when the Province of Ontario was created upon Confederation. The predecessor office, lieutenant governor of Upper Canada, was a British colonial officer, appointed by the British government to administer the government of the colony, from 1791 to 1841. (Prior to 1791, the territory which is now Ontario was part of the old Province of Quebec, which was administered by the colonial governors of the Province of Quebec.)

In 1841, the two provinces of Upper Canada and Lower Canada were abolished and merged into the new Province of Canada, with a single Parliament and Governor General. Upper Canada was known as Canada West, but did not have a separate government or lieutenant governor. It was simply an administrative division of the Province of Canada.

Prior to Confederation, the lieutenant governors of Upper Canada were either British colonial administrators or British Army officers. The first lieutenant governor of Ontario, General Sir Henry William Stisted, was the last British lieutenant governor. From 1868 onwards, only Canadians were appointed to the position.

== Lieutenant governors of Upper Canada, 1791–1841 ==
No.	Portrait	Name (birth–death)	Term of office		Monarch Reign
No.	Portrait	Name (birth–death)	Took office	Left office	Monarch Reign
1		John Graves Simcoe (1752–1806)	1791	1798	George III (1760–1820)
–		Peter Russell (1733–1808); Administrator of the Government	1796	1799	George III (1760–1820)
2		Peter Hunter (1746–1805)	1799	1805	George III (1760–1820)
–		Alexander Grant (1734–1813); Administrator of the Government	1805	1806	George III (1760–1820)
3		Francis Gore (1769–1852)	1806	1817	George III (1760–1820)
–		Sir Isaac Brock (1769–1812); Acting	1811	1812	George III (1760–1820)
–		Sir Roger Hale Sheaffe; 1st Baronet (1763–1851); Acting	1812	1813	George III (1760–1820)
–		Sir Francis de Rottenburg; Baron of Rottenburg (1757–1832); Acting	1813	1813	George III (1760–1820)
–		Sir Gordon Drummond (1772–1854); Acting	1813	1814	George III (1760–1820)
–		Sir George Murray (1772–1846); Acting	1815	1815	George III (1760–1820)
–		Sir Frederick Philipse Robinson (1763–1852); Acting	1815	1815	George III (1760–1820)
–		Samuel Smith (1756–1826); Administrator of the Government	1817	1818	George III (1760–1820)
4		Sir Peregrine Maitland (1777–1854)	1818	1828	George III (1760–1820)
4		Sir Peregrine Maitland (1777–1854)	1818	1828	George IV (1820–1830)
5		Sir John Colborne (1778–1863)	1828	1836	George IV (1820–1830)
5		Sir John Colborne (1778–1863)	1828	1836	William IV (1830–1837)
6		Sir Francis Bond Head (1778–1863)	1836	1838	William IV (1830–1837)
6		Sir Francis Bond Head (1778–1863)	1836	1838	Victoria (1837–1901)
7		Sir George Arthur (1778–1863)	1838	1839	Victoria (1837–1901)
8		Charles Poulett Thomson; 1st Baron Sydenham (1799–1841)	1839	1841	Victoria (1837–1901)

== Lieutenant governors of Ontario, 1867–present ==
No.	Portrait	Name (birth–death)	Term of office		Monarch Reign	Premier Tenure
No.	Portrait	Name (birth–death)	Took office	Left office	Monarch Reign	Premier Tenure
1		Henry William Stisted (1817–1875)	1 July 1867	14 July 1868	Victoria (1837–1901)	John Sandfield Macdonald (1867–1871)
2		William Pearce Howland (1811–1907)	15 July 1868	11 November 1873	Victoria (1837–1901)	John Sandfield Macdonald (1867–1871)
2		William Pearce Howland (1811–1907)	15 July 1868	11 November 1873	Victoria (1837–1901)	Edward Blake (1871–1872)
2		William Pearce Howland (1811–1907)	15 July 1868	11 November 1873	Victoria (1837–1901)	Sir Oliver Mowat (1872–1896)
3		John Willoughby Crawford (1817–1875)	12 November 1873	13 May 1875	Victoria (1837–1901)	Sir Oliver Mowat (1872–1896)
–		Sir William Buell Richards (1815–1889); Administrator of the Government	13 May 1875	18 May 1875	Victoria (1837–1901)	Sir Oliver Mowat (1872–1896)
4		Donald Alexander Macdonald (1817–1896)	18 May 1875	30 June 1880	Victoria (1837–1901)	Sir Oliver Mowat (1872–1896)
5		John Beverley Robinson (1821–1896)	1 July 1880	31 May 1887	Victoria (1837–1901)	Sir Oliver Mowat (1872–1896)
6		Sir Alexander Campbell (1822–1892)	1 June 1887	24 May 1892	Victoria (1837–1901)	Sir Oliver Mowat (1872–1896)
–		John Hawkins Hagarty (1816–1900); Administrator of the Government	24 May 1892	30 May 1892	Victoria (1837–1901)	Sir Oliver Mowat (1872–1896)
7		George Airey Kirkpatrick (1841–1899)	30 May 1892	7 November 1896	Victoria (1837–1901)	Sir Oliver Mowat (1872–1896)
7		George Airey Kirkpatrick (1841–1899)	30 May 1892	7 November 1896	Victoria (1837–1901)	Arthur Sturgis Hardy (1896–1899)
–		Sir Casimir Gzowski (1813–1898); Administrator of the Government	{7 November 1896	18 November 1897	Victoria (1837–1901)	Arthur Sturgis Hardy (1896–1899)
8		Sir Oliver Mowat (1820–1903)	18 November 1897	19 April 1903	Victoria (1837–1901)	Arthur Sturgis Hardy (1896–1899)
8		Sir Oliver Mowat (1820–1903)	18 November 1897	19 April 1903	Victoria (1837–1901)	Sir George William Ross (1899–1905)
8		Sir Oliver Mowat (1820–1903)	18 November 1897	19 April 1903	Edward VII (1901–1910)	Sir George William Ross (1899–1905)
–		Sir Charles Moss (1840–1912); Administrator of the Government	19 April 1903	21 April 1903	Edward VII (1901–1910)	Sir George William Ross (1899–1905)
9		Sir William Mortimer Clark (1836–1915)	21 April 1903	21 September 1908	Edward VII (1901–1910)	Sir George William Ross (1899–1905)
9		Sir William Mortimer Clark (1836–1915)	21 April 1903	21 September 1908	Edward VII (1901–1910)	Sir James Whitney (1905–1914)
10		Sir John Morison Gibson (1842–1929)	21 September 1908	26 September 1914	Edward VII (1901–1910)	Sir James Whitney (1905–1914)
10		Sir John Morison Gibson (1842–1929)	21 September 1908	26 September 1914	George V (1910–1936)	Sir James Whitney (1905–1914)
11		Sir John Strathearn Hendrie (1857–1923)	26 September 1914	20 November 1919	George V (1910–1936)	Sir William Howard Hearst (1914–1919)
11		Sir John Strathearn Hendrie (1857–1923)	26 September 1914	20 November 1919	George V (1910–1936)	Ernest Charles Drury (1919–1923)
12		Lionel Herbert Clarke (1859–1921)	20 November 1919	29 August 1921	George V (1910–1936)	Ernest Charles Drury (1919–1923)
–		Sir William Ralph Meredith (1840–1923); Administrator of the Government	29 August 1921	10 September 1921	George V (1910–1936)	Ernest Charles Drury (1919–1923)
13		Henry Cockshutt (1868–1944)	10 September 1921	12 January 1927	George V (1910–1936)	Ernest Charles Drury (1919–1923)
13		Henry Cockshutt (1868–1944)	10 September 1921	12 January 1927	George V (1910–1936)	Howard Ferguson (1923–1930)
14		William Donald Ross (1869–1947)	12 January 1927	25 October 1931	George V (1910–1936)	Howard Ferguson (1923–1930)
14		William Donald Ross (1869–1947)	12 January 1927	25 October 1931	George V (1910–1936)	George Stewart Henry (1930–1934)
–		Sir William Mulock (1843–1944); Administrator of the Government	25 October 1931	1 November 1932	George V (1910–1936)	George Stewart Henry (1930–1934)
15		Herbert Alexander Bruce (1868–1963)	1 November 1932	23 November 1937	George V (1910–1936)	George Stewart Henry (1930–1934)
15		Herbert Alexander Bruce (1868–1963)	1 November 1932	23 November 1937	George V (1910–1936)	Mitchell Hepburn (1934–1942)
15		Herbert Alexander Bruce (1868–1963)	1 November 1932	23 November 1937	Edward VIII (1936)	Mitchell Hepburn (1934–1942)
15		Herbert Alexander Bruce (1868–1963)	1 November 1932	23 November 1937	George VI (1936–1952)	Mitchell Hepburn (1934–1942)
16		Albert Edward Matthews (1873–1949)	23 November 1937	26 December 1946	George VI (1936–1952)	Mitchell Hepburn (1934–1942)
16		Albert Edward Matthews (1873–1949)	23 November 1937	26 December 1946	George VI (1936–1952)	Gordon Daniel Conant (1942–1943)
16		Albert Edward Matthews (1873–1949)	23 November 1937	26 December 1946	George VI (1936–1952)	Harry Nixon (1943)
16		Albert Edward Matthews (1873–1949)	23 November 1937	26 December 1946	George VI (1936–1952)	George A. Drew (1943–1948)
17		Ray Lawson (1886–1980)	26 December 1946	18 February 1952	George VI (1936–1952)	George A. Drew (1943–1948)
17		Ray Lawson (1886–1980)	26 December 1946	18 February 1952	George VI (1936–1952)	Thomas Laird Kennedy (1948–1949)
17		Ray Lawson (1886–1980)	26 December 1946	18 February 1952	George VI (1936–1952)	Leslie Frost (1949–1961)
17		Ray Lawson (1886–1980)	26 December 1946	18 February 1952	Elizabeth II (1952–2022)	Leslie Frost (1949–1961)
18		Louis Orville Breithaupt (1890–1960)	18 February 1952	30 December 1957	Elizabeth II (1952–2022)	Leslie Frost (1949–1961)
19		John Keiller MacKay (1880–1970)	30 December 1957	1 May 1963	Elizabeth II (1952–2022)	Leslie Frost (1949–1961)
19		John Keiller MacKay (1880–1970)	30 December 1957	1 May 1963	Elizabeth II (1952–2022)	John Robarts (1961–1971)
20		William Earl Rowe (1894–1984)	1 May 1963	4 July 1968	Elizabeth II (1952–2022)	John Robarts (1961–1971)
21		William Ross Macdonald (1891–1976)	4 July 1968	10 April 1974	Elizabeth II (1952–2022)	John Robarts (1961–1971)
21		William Ross Macdonald (1891–1976)	4 July 1968	10 April 1974	Elizabeth II (1952–2022)	Bill Davis (1971–1985)
22		Pauline Mills McGibbon (1910–2001)	10 April 1974	15 September 1980	Elizabeth II (1952–2022)	Bill Davis (1971–1985)
23		John Black Aird (1923–1995)	15 September 1980	20 September 1985	Elizabeth II (1952–2022)	Bill Davis (1971–1985)
23		John Black Aird (1923–1995)	15 September 1980	20 September 1985	Elizabeth II (1952–2022)	Frank Miller (1985)
23		John Black Aird (1923–1995)	15 September 1980	20 September 1985	Elizabeth II (1952–2022)	David Peterson (1985–1990)
24		Lincoln Alexander (1922–2012)	20 September 1985	10 December 1991	Elizabeth II (1952–2022)	David Peterson (1985–1990)
24		Lincoln Alexander (1922–2012)	20 September 1985	10 December 1991	Elizabeth II (1952–2022)	Bob Rae (1990–1995)
25		Hal Jackman (born 1932)	11 December 1991	24 January 1997	Elizabeth II (1952–2022)	Bob Rae (1990–1995)
25		Hal Jackman (born 1932)	11 December 1991	24 January 1997	Elizabeth II (1952–2022)	Mike Harris (1995–2002)
26		Hilary Weston (1942–2025)	24 January 1997	7 March 2002	Elizabeth II (1952–2022)	Mike Harris (1995–2002)
27		James Bartleman (1939–2023)	7 March 2002	5 September 2007	Elizabeth II (1952–2022)	Mike Harris (1995–2002)
27		James Bartleman (1939–2023)	7 March 2002	5 September 2007	Elizabeth II (1952–2022)	Ernie Eves (2002–2003)
27		James Bartleman (1939–2023)	7 March 2002	5 September 2007	Elizabeth II (1952–2022)	Dalton McGuinty (2003–2013)
28		David Onley (1950–2023)	5 September 2007	23 September 2014	Elizabeth II (1952–2022)	Dalton McGuinty (2003–2013)
28		David Onley (1950–2023)	5 September 2007	23 September 2014	Elizabeth II (1952–2022)	Kathleen Wynne (2013–2018)
29		Elizabeth Dowdeswell (born 1944)	23 September 2014	14 November 2023	Elizabeth II (1952–2022)	Kathleen Wynne (2013–2018)
29		Elizabeth Dowdeswell (born 1944)	23 September 2014	14 November 2023	Elizabeth II (1952–2022)	Doug Ford (since 2018)
29		Elizabeth Dowdeswell (born 1944)	23 September 2014	14 November 2023	Charles III (since 2022)	Doug Ford (since 2018)
30		Edith Dumont (born 1964)	14 November 2023		Charles III (since 2022)	Doug Ford (since 2018)

== See also ==
- Office-holders of Canada
- Canadian incumbents by year
