= Peter Hunter (British Army officer) =

Canadian British colonial administrator

Lieutenant-General Peter Hunter (11 July 1746 – 21 August 1805) was a British Army officer and colonial administrator. He was the eldest son of John Hunter, Laird of Knapp and his spouse, Euphemia Jack of Longforgan, Perthshire, Scotland.

In 1767, he entered the British Army by purchasing an ensign's commission in the 1st Foot. He rose to lieutenant in 1770 and served in Menorca from 1771 to 1775, being promoted to captain on the regiment's return to England. He became a major in the 92nd Foot in 1779 and went to the West Indies, where he rose to the rank of lieutenant-colonel, transferring to the 60th Foot in 1781. His unit was posted to Nova Scotia in 1786 and he assumed command of the battalion in 1787.

In 1789, Hunter, after leave in England, was appointed acting Superintendent of British Honduras in 1790, following the suspension of incumbent Edward Despard. He held that position until 1791 and was said to have administered the new colony in an authoritarian manner. He returned to England in 1793 and was given the rank of colonel serving in Europe and then the Caribbean before becoming a military governor in County Wexford, Ireland following the Irish Rebellion of 1798.

On 10 April 1799, Hunter was appointed Lieutenant Governor of Upper Canada, succeeding John Graves Simcoe. He was also made commander of military forces in both Upper Canada and Lower Canada with the rank of lieutenant-general in 1802. He became colonel of the 9th Foot in 1804.

Hunter died unexpectedly in 1805 in Quebec and was buried at Cimetière Anglican Saint-Matthew. Alexander Grant became administrator of Upper Canada and continued Hunter's policies until a new lieutenant governor, Francis Gore, arrived from Britain in August 1806.

Hunterstown, a geographic township and village in the Municipality of Saint-Paulin, Quebec, was named after him.

Military offices
Preceded by James Rooke	Colonel-Commandant of the 4th Battalion, 60th Regiment of Foot; 1796–1804	Succeeded by Lord Charles FitzRoy
Preceded by Albemarle Bertie	Colonel of the 9th (East Norfolk) Regiment of Foot; 1804–1805	Succeeded by Robert Brownrigg
Government offices
Preceded by Edward Marcus Despard	Acting Superintendent of British Honduras; 1790–1791	Vacant Title next held by Thomas Potts (as Chief Magistrate); Thomas Barrow
Preceded by Peter Russell	Lieutenant Governor of Upper Canada; 1799–1805	Succeeded by Alexander Grant
