= Peregrine Maitland =

British Army officer and colonial administrator (1777–1854)

General Sir Peregrine Maitland GCB
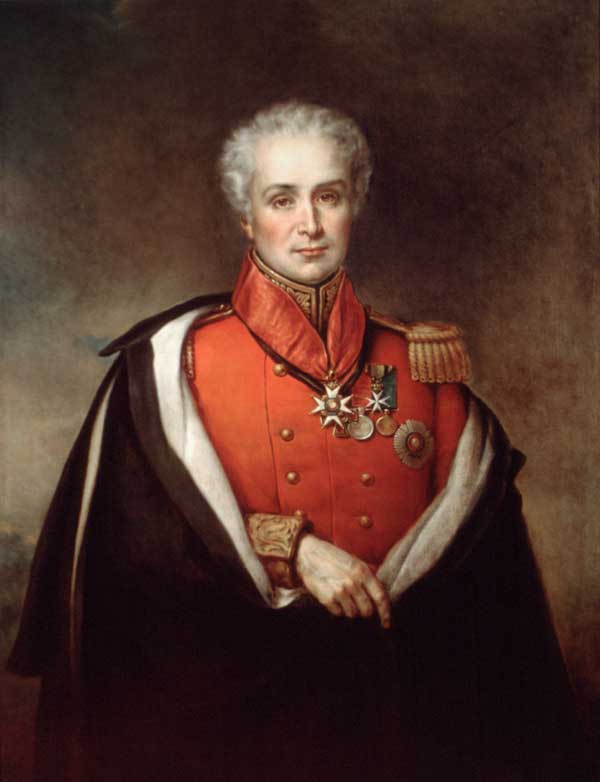
- Maitland c. 1882-1883

1st Chancellor of King's College
- In office 1827 – 1828
- President: John Strachan
- Preceded by: Position established
- Succeeded by: John Colborne

Personal details
- Born: 6 July 1777 Longparish, Hampshire
- Died: 30 May 1854 (aged 76) Eaton Place, London
- Military career
- Allegiance: Great Britain; United Kingdom; East India Company
- Branch: Foot Guards
- Service years: 1791–1836
- Rank: General
- Commands: Madras Army
- Conflicts: Haitian Revolution; French Revolutionary Wars; Napoleonic Wars
- Other work: Lt. Governor of Upper Canada; Lt. Governor of Nova Scotia; Governor of Cape Colony

General Sir Peregrine Maitland, GCB (6 July 1777 – 30 May 1854) was a British Army officer and colonial administrator. He also was a cricketer from 1798 to 1808 and an early advocate for the establishment of what would become the Canadian Indian residential school system.

== Early life ==
Maitland was born at Longparish House in Longparish, Hampshire, the eldest of five sons of Thomas Maitland of Lyndhurst, Hampshire, (d. 1797) by his spouse Jane, daughter of Edward Mathew, General of the Coldstream Guards by his wife Lady Jane (d. 21 August 1793), daughter of Peregrine Bertie, 2nd Duke of Ancaster and Kesteven. His father was a plantation owner and believed to be from the Pittrichie branch of the Aberdeenshire Maitlands.

== Military career ==
After joining the 1st Foot Guards at the age of 15 as an ensign he went on to serve in Flanders in 1794, by which time he had achieved his promotion to lieutenant. In 1798, he took part in the unsuccessful landing at Ostend. In the Peninsular War, he served at both the Battle of Vigo, and at Corunna, for which he was awarded a medal. He took part in the Walcheren in 1809. During the later stages of the Peninsula War was second in command of his regiment at Cadiz, and later at the Battle of Seville.

He served with distinction at Quatre Bras and the Battle of Waterloo. Promoted in early June (3 June 1815) to major general, he was assigned to the First Corps, under the overall command of the Prince of Orange. On 18 June, the day of Waterloo, he commanded two battalions of the 1st Foot Guards, each 1000-men strong and led the Guards in repelling the final assault of the French Imperial Guard. For his service at Waterloo, Maitland was created a Knight Commander of the Order of the Bath, (KCB) on 22 June 1815, the Dutch Order of William and the Russian Order of St. Vladimir. For their part, the 1st Foot Guards were granted the honorary title of 'First or Grenadier Regiment of Foot Guards'.

He was appointed lieutenant governor of Upper Canada in 1818 and supported the Family Compact that dominated the province. He attempted to suppress and reform pro-American tendencies in the colony and resisted demands of radicals in the government. In his role Maitland was the first to propose the "civilizing" techniques that would eventually lead to the establishment of the Canadian Indian residential school system. He believed that while a shift from hunting to agricultural pursuits would assist with civilizing Indigenous populations, it was gaining the influence of children that would lead to success. In an 1820 report to the Colonial Office he argued for the introduction of industrial schools to minimize the children's exposure to the savage influence of their families. His tenure in Upper Canada ended in 1828 when he was appointed lieutenant-governor of Nova Scotia serving there from 1828 until 1834.

Maitland went to India and became commander in chief of the Madras Army in 1836 serving for two years. In 1843 he was appointed Colonel of the 17th (Leicestershire) Regiment and in 1844 Governor of the Cape Colony, but was removed during the Xhosa War. He is still highly respected in the Kingdom of Lesotho for his judgment on the border issue between the Orange River Afrikaners and the Basotho of King Moshoeshoe I, which, had it been implemented, would have secured the economic future of the kingdom. He was made a Knight Grand Cross of the Order of the Bath on 6 April 1852.

== Lieutenant Governor of Nova Scotia ==
Maitland became the Lieutenant Governor of Nova Scotia on 29 Nov. 1828, with the added responsibility of commander-in-chief of the forces in the Atlantic region. He was popular. Certainly, his strongly moral conduct influenced Halifax's society. By insisting on walking to church, he effectively ended the garrison parades on Sunday, the city's major social event, and he publicly denounced the open market that day.

Maitland was responsible for the settlement reached for Pictou Academy. In dealing with immigration and settlement, he had lands laid out in Cape Breton at crown expense so that the 4,000 immigrants expected that year could be legally placed and systematically settled.

In October 1832 Maitland went to England on leave, presumably because of his health, and the government was placed in charge of Thomas Nickleson Jeffery. Though he continued to conduct official correspondence from England, he never returned to North America and he was succeeded in Nova Scotia by Sir Colin Campbell in July 1834.

== First-class cricket career ==
Maitland was an amateur cricketer who made 27 known appearances from 1798 to 1808.

He was mainly associated with Marylebone Cricket Club (MCC) and he also played for Surrey and Hampshire.

== Family ==
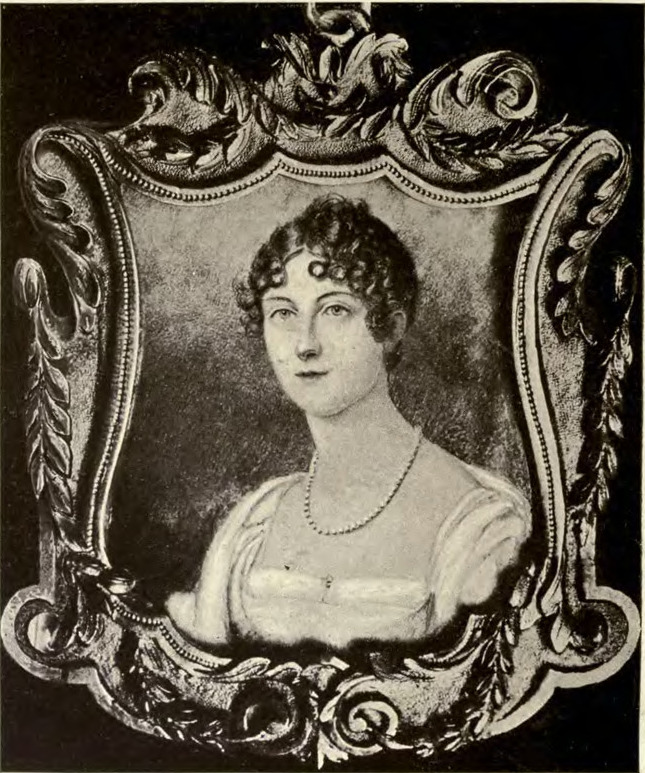
Lady Sarah Maitland

Peregrine Maitland was the eldest of five sons of Thomas Maitland (died 1797) and Jane Mathew (1759-1830), daughter of Major General Edward Mathew and Jane Bertie. He had three sisters, and his eldest sister Jane married in 1800 a Lieutenant Colonel Warren of the Third Foot Guards. Maitland's maternal aunt married James Austen, brother of Jane Austen.

Maitland married twice: (1) on 8 June 1803, in St George's, Hanover Square, (Westminster), to Louisa (d. 1805), daughter of Sir Edward Crofton, 2nd Baronet, and (2) at the Duke of Wellington's HQ during the occupation of Paris, 9 October 1815, Lady Sarah Lennox (1792–1873), one of the daughters of the 4th Duke of Richmond. Despite the initial opposition of her father, the marriage took place after the intervention and support of the Duke of Wellington. When the Duke of Richmond was appointed Governor-in-Chief of Canada, he appointed Maitland as Lieutenant-Governor of Upper Canada.

By his first wife, he had one son, Peregrine Maitland b. 1 May 1804. By his second wife, he had at least seven children:

- Sarah Maitland (1817–1900), who married Thomas Bowes Forster (1802–1870), Lieutenant-Colonel in the Madras Army.
- Charlotte Caroline Maitland (9 Dec 1817-8 Jan 1897), married John George Turnbull (10 Aug 1790-2 Jan 1872) on 17 Jul 1837
- Charles Lennox Brownlow Maitland (27 Sep 1823-5 Jan 1891)
- Jane Bertie Maitland (abt 1826-27 Apr 1885)
- Emily Sophia Maitland (1827-16 Dec 1891), married Frederick Herbert Kerr (30 Sep 1818-Jan 1896) on 13 Jan 1846
- George Maitland (1830-1831) (buried at St. Paul's Church (Halifax))
- Eliza Mary Maitland (1832), married John Desborough (24 Jan 1824-14 Jan 1918) on 14 Jul 1857
- Georgina Louisa Maitland (aft 1832-5 Jan 1852), married Thomas Eardley Wilmot Blomefield (died 15 Jan 1896) on 2 Jan 1844
- Horatio Lennox Arthur Maitland (13 Mar 1834-29 Mar 1904)

He was buried at St Paul's Church in Tongham in Surrey.

He is a great-great-great uncle of composer and impresario Andrew Lloyd Webber and the cellist Julian Lloyd Webber.

== Maitland in popular fiction ==
In his novel Les Misérables, Victor Hugo credits Maitland (or Colville) with asking for the surrender of the Imperial Guard and receiving General Cambronne's reply of "Merde". (Chapter XIV. The Last Square)

== Legacy ==
Port Maitland, Nova Scotia, is named after him, as is Maitland, Nova Scotia. Maitland Street, Dartmouth, Nova Scotia is named after him, as is Maitland Street in London, Ontario. Also named in his honor are Maitland Street and Maitland Terrace (in Church and Wellesley), Maitland Place (continuation of Maitland Street east of Jarvis Street in Cabbagetown) in Toronto, Ontario. The Church of St. John the Evangelist Anglican in Niagara Falls, Ontario was constructed in 1825 largely through the efforts of Lieutenant-Governor Sir Peregrine Maitland. The church remained in regular use until 1957. Maitland, Ontario, on the St. Lawrence River is named after him.

In New South Wales, Australia, the town of Maitland bears his name. It is one of a series of settlements founded in the years following Waterloo named for Wellington and his subordinate commanders, both from Waterloo and the Peninsula. These include Wellington, Orange, Picton, Grahamstown (Sir Thomas Graham), Pakenham (Sir Edward Pakenham) and Beresfield (Sir William Carr Beresford - misspelt).

In South Africa Maitland, Cape Town, a light industrial and residential suburb, the Maitland River west of Port Elizabeth (empties in Indian Ocean at Maitland Beach, Maitland Local Authority Nature Reserve, and numerous streets in the country are named after him.

Sir Peregrine Maitland is responsible for the naming of Lobo, Ontario, Mariposa, Ontario, Orillia, Ontario, Oro, Ontario, Oso, Ontario, Sombra, Ontario and Zorra, Ontario. All names are in Spanish.

== External sources ==
- CricketArchive record
- Sir Peregrine Maitland Letter RG 244 Brock University Library Digital Repository

Government offices
Preceded by Samuel Smith	Lieutenant Governor of Upper Canada; 1818–1828	Succeeded by Sir John Colborne
Preceded by Thomas N. Jeffrey (acting)	Lieutenant-Governor of Nova Scotia; 1828–1834	Succeeded by Thomas N. Jeffrey (acting)
Military offices
Preceded by Sir Robert O'Callaghan	C-in-C, Madras Army; 1836–1838	Succeeded by Sir Jasper Nicolls
Preceded by Sir Frederick Augustus Wetherall	Colonel of 17th (Leicestershire) Regiment; 1843–1854	Succeeded by Thomas James Wemyss
Preceded by Christopher Chowne	Colonel of 76th Regiment of Foot; 1834–1836	Succeeded by George Middlemore
Government offices
Preceded by Sir George Thomas Napier	Governor of the Cape Colony; 1844–1847	Succeeded by Henry Pottinger
Academic offices
Preceded by (new position)	Chancellor of King's College; 1827–1828	Succeeded by Sir John Colborne
