= Vincent Massey Junior School =

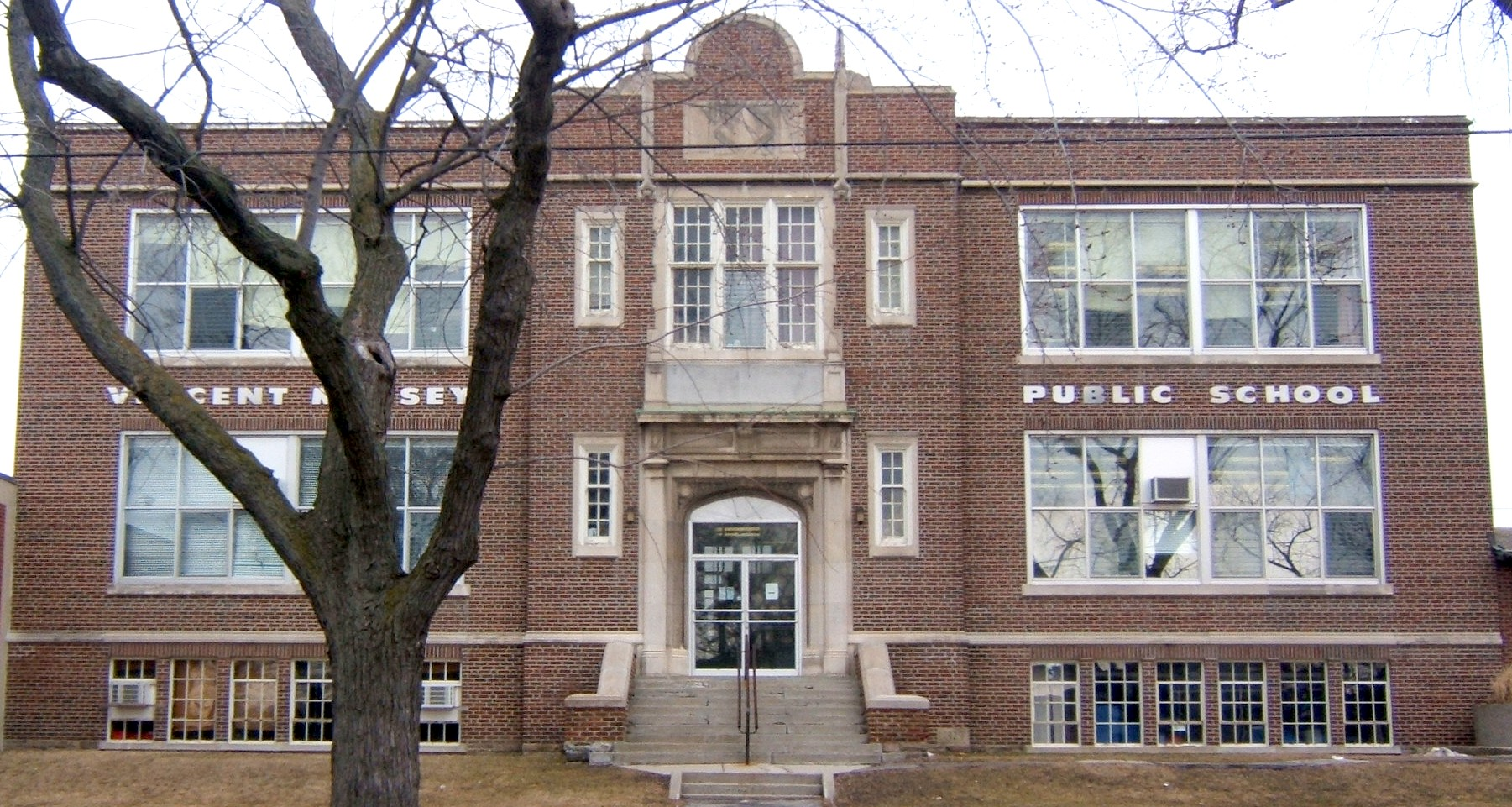
- Vincent Massey Junior School in 2009

Location
- 68 Daisy Avenue; Etobicoke, Toronto, Ontario, M8W 1S1; Canada; 43.59777°N 79.52836°W

Information
- Other names: Vincent Massey Day School and Child Care; Vincent Massey Day School
- Former name: Daisy Avenue Public School (1929–1964)
- School type: Public Elementary school
- Established: 1929
- Status: Property school, building partially demolished (1963-1964 addition)
- Closed: 1983
- School board: Toronto District School Board (Etobicoke Board of Education)
- Oversight: Toronto Lands Corporation
- Superintendent: Sandra Tondat; LN19
- Area trustee: Patrick Nunziata; Ward 3
- Grades: JK-5
- Language: English

Vincent Massey Junior School (Vincent Massey JS, VMJS or Massey), formerly Daisy Avenue Public School is located at 68 Daisy Avenue in the Long Branch area of Etobicoke, Ontario, Canada. This school has kindergarten through grade five. The property was owned by the Toronto District School Board and was sold to a developer in 2017.

== Overview ==
Opened in 1929 as Daisy Avenue Public School by the Etobicoke School Board Section 12, and the Collegiate Gothic building designed by architect George Roper Gouinlock. The school had two additions in 1955 to the east and 1963–64 to the west (designed by Murray, Brown and Elton). That same year, Daisy Avenue received its name Vincent Massey Junior School until its closure in 1983 by the Etobicoke Board of Education. The older children go to neighbouring James S. Bell Middle School and New Toronto Secondary School.

The property was owned by the Toronto District School Board, now under Toronto Lands Corporation and was sold in 2015. Since 1985, Vincent Massey Academy occupies the building as a Private, Reggio Inspired Education for children from infant to grade three. In 2014, Vincent Massey Academy opened their second campus located at 432 Horner Ave, in the Alderwood area of Etobicoke, Ontario, Canada. This campus offers program for children from infant to preschool. The gym on the west side was demolished (site now a parking area and walkway for 80 Daisy Avenue) with the 1955 east addition and the original building preserved. The school yard on the north side was redeveloped into townhouses.

The school is named after Vincent Massey, former Governor General of Canada, one of several across Canada:

- Vincent Massey Collegiate Institute (Etobicoke/Toronto, ON)
- Vincent Massey Public School (Ottawa)
- Vincent Massey Collegiate Formerly Vincent Massey Junior High School (Montréal, QC)
- Massey College, University of Toronto
- Vincent Massey Secondary School (Windsor, ON)
- Vincent Massey High School (Brandon, MB)

== In popular culture ==
The school was used to depict the fictional eponymous school featured in the 1987-1989 CBC teen drama Degrassi Junior High. In the series finale, the school burns down, but this was achieved using visual effects. The school also appears in the movie The Last Detail.
