= Lakeview, Mississauga =

Lakeview
- Neighbourhood
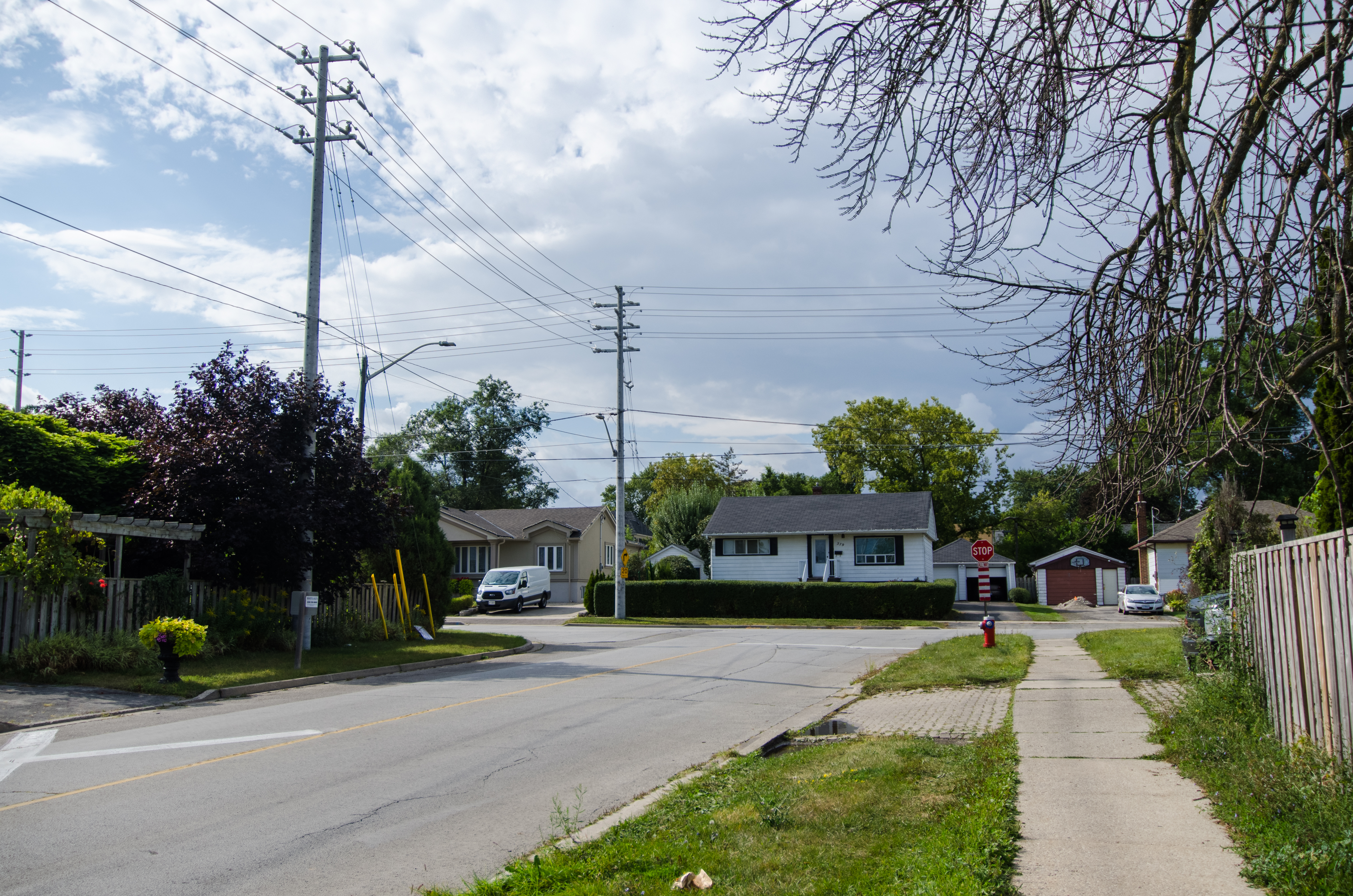
- Marf and Revus Avenues in Lakeview
- Interactive map of Lakeview
- Coordinates: 43°34′15″N 79°34′05″W
- Country: Canada
- Province: Ontario
- Regional municipality: Peel
- City: Mississauga

Government
  - MP: Charles Sousa (Mississauga—Lakeshore)
  - MPP: Rudy Cuzzetto (Mississauga—Lakeshore)
  - Councillors: Stephen Dasko (Ward 1)
- Postal codes: L4X, L4Y, L5E and L5G

Lakeview is a neighbourhood in Mississauga, Ontario, Canada, centred on Lakeshore Road in the extreme southeastern corner of the city, along the shore of Lake Ontario, between the larger neighbourhood of Port Credit to the west and the Long Branch neighbourhood of Toronto to the east.

Lakeview was known for the 4 Sisters, the four smokestacks of the former Lakeview Generating Station. They were called the 4 Sisters because the generating plant actually had eight boilers and two boilers were 'sistered' to a common stack. The generating station was demolished in 2007, about a year after the four stacks were demolished, which occurred on the morning of June 12, 2006. At 493 feet (150 metres) tall each they were the tallest structures in the area.

Along the shore of Lake Ontario, Lakeview is the home of the Port Credit Yacht Club, Lakefront Promenade Marina, Arthur P. Kennedy Water Treatment Plant, and G. E. Booth (Lakeview) Wastewater Treatment Plant.

The area is also home to the Lakeview Branch Library, and two high schools: Cawthra Park Secondary School, and St. Paul Secondary School. (A third, Gordon Graydon Memorial Secondary School, closed.) Many parks run along Lake Ontario, including lit baseball diamonds used by many junior leagues.

== History ==
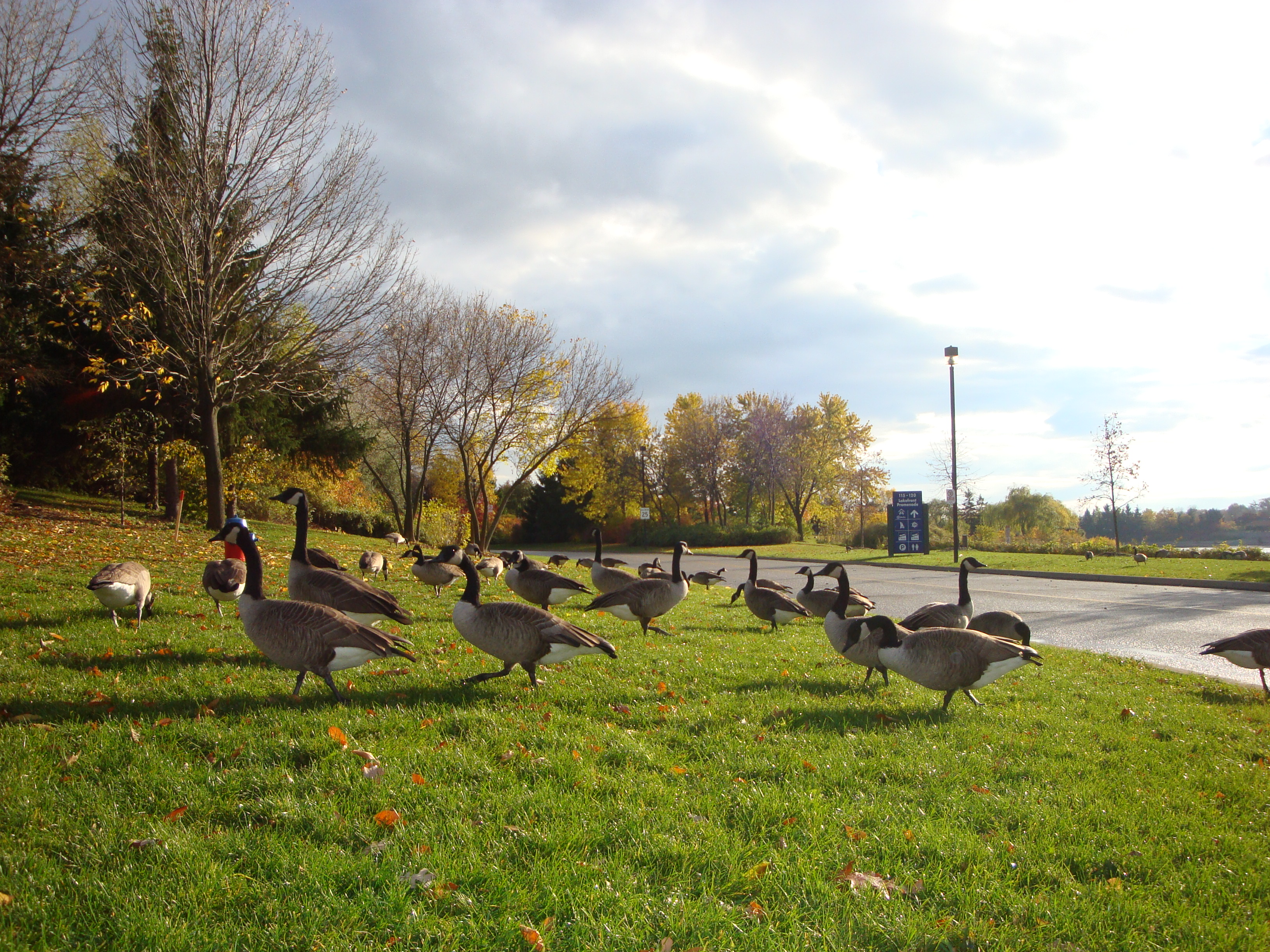
Lakefront Promenade Park

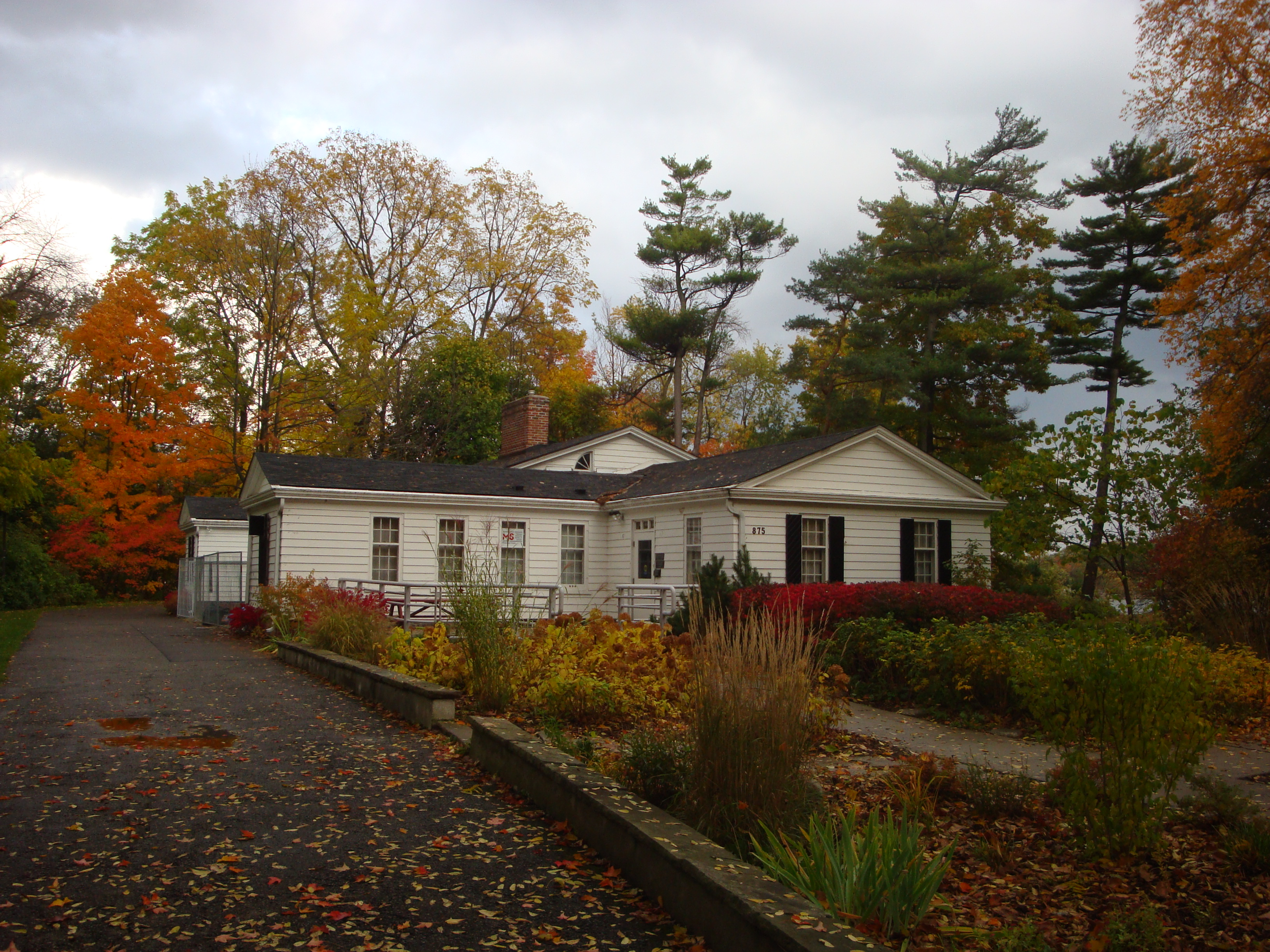
MSSC offices at Enola Avenue in Lakeview

Lakeview is within the Mississauga Purchase of 1806, lands acquired by the Crown from the Mississauga First Nation. Portions of the eastern section of the Lakeview was part of the Colonel Smith Tract, which was added to lands Colonel Samuel Smith had acquired in 1801 in neighbouring Etobicoke. The area later became Toronto Township which was restructured into the Town of Mississauga in 1968.

Lakeview was the site of the Long Branch Armory, which included a rifle range, training facilities and the Long Branch Aerodrome, the first commercial air training airport in Canada. The airport was run by the Curtiss Aviation School, and was located west of the namesake Long Branch neighbourhood in Toronto. The Lakeview location is documented by the presence of Aviation Road running south off Lakeshore Road just west of Cawthra Road. The site is further acknowledged by a historic plaque. The site was home for several arms and munitions manufacturing plants during World War II. One large munitions factory in Lakeview was staffed almost exclusively by women during the war.

=== Long Branch Aerodrome ===
The Long Branch Aerodrome was a 100-acre airfield located on Lakeshore Road just west of Dixie Road. The Long Branch Aerodrome has the distinction of being the first Aerodrome in Canada and home to Canada's first aviator training school. It opened on May 20, 1915, by Curtiss Aeroplanes and Motors Company for the Royal Flying Corps. Aircraft such as the Curtiss JN-4 "Jenny" soon became a common sight at the airfield, which included three aircraft hangars.

In January 1917, the newly designated Royal Flying Corps, Canada, the forerunner to the Royal Canadian Air Force, opened the RFC Training Centre at Long Branch. The Long Branch training centre also provided instruction on flying boats at nearby Hanlan's Point on the Toronto Islands, the first seaplane base in Canada. By July 1917, the flight school relocated to the Armour Heights Aerodrome. Long Branch became the Cadet Ground Training School for the Royal Flying Corps. Both the school and the aerodrome closed in 1919. During World War II, the former aerodrome served initially as Non-Permanent Active Militia's No 21 Training Centre and then as an army small arms training centre (Long Branch Rifle Ranges). After the war, the Lakeview Armoury was established on the site but was demolished in the 1950s.

Not the slightest trace remains of the airfield today. From 1962 - 2005, the waterfront portion of the property was the location of Ontario Power Generation's Lakeview Generating Station. In September 1969, a plaque was erected at the site to commemorate Canada's first Aerodrome.

=== Small Arms Limited, Long Branch Arsenal ===
Adjacent to the west side of Marie Curtis Park (now Marie Curtis Park West or Lakeshore Park) in Lakeview is the former site of the Small Arms Limited Long Branch Arsenal. The Federal Government had owned the lands south of Lake Shore Road, between the Etobicoke River to just west of Cawthra Road, from the late 1800s into the early 20th-Century. The first land purchase was made in 1889 for a rifle range, to replace the one at New Fort York. The military use was expanded for World War I, becoming the summer quarters for several regiments and a staging area for troops to go overseas.

The Ordnance Branch of the Department of National Defence authorized the construction of a factory on the site in 1940. After transfer to the Department of Munitions and Supply, a Crown corporation, Small Arms Limited, was formed to operate the facility. By June 1941, the first five rifles had been produced. Huge quantities of British-pattern military small arms were manufactured there during the Second World War, including the No.4 MkI* Lee–Enfield bolt-action rifle, and the Sten submachine gun (or machine-carbine). Small Arms Ltd. ceased operations at the end of December 1945. Beginning January 1, 1946, operations continued as the Small Arms Division, Canadian Arsenals Limited (CAL) a new Crown corporation under the Department of Supply and Services. CAL was created as Canada planned to wind down arms manufacturing and focus on in- service support of the Canadian Army equipment and planned to lease out space at the plant to non- arms tenants. In 1955 CAL was contracted to manufacture C1 and C2 semi auto rifles based on FN FAL for the Canadian Army. CAL ceased operations in 1974 and the factory was closed June 30, 1976. The property was later used by Canada Post as a distribution centre.

The factory complex was demolished and the "Arsenal Lands" are now being used for the stockpiling of landfill for use in future aquatic park development. The lands are slated to eventually become part of Lakeshore Park. The buildings of the office complex at the foot of Dixie Road were saved for public use (home to the relocated Antiques Market from St. Lawrence Market North), while only the water tower remains from the factory complex.

=== Lakeview Village ===
In 2019, Mississauga City Council endorsed a plan to build 8,050 housing units at Lakeview Village, a 177-acre (72 ha) site formerly occupied by Lakeview Generating Station and the current Lakview Park.

== Attractions ==
- Jim Tovey Lakeview Conservation Area opening May 2026

more info https://cvc.ca/project/jim-tovey-lakeview-conservation-area/

- Lakeview Golf Course, opened in 1907, is an 18-hole city-owned course. The course hosted the Canadian Open in 1923 and 1934.

== Transportation ==
- Port Credit and Long Branch GO stations
- Queen Elizabeth Way
- Miway routes 5 Dixie, 8 Cawthra, 23 Lakeshore and 31 Ogden

CNR also had passenger train stop first at Meredith Avenue (built in 1855 by GWR) and then from the 1920s to 1930 at Dixie Road.

== Notable people ==
- Harland "Colonel" Sanders, founder of the Kentucky Fried Chicken chain, lived in the area (1337 Melton Drive near Dixie Road and Queensway) part-time from 1965 to 1980 during the time he was overseeing the Canadian operations.

== See also ==
- Port Credit, Ontario
- Lorne Park
- Meadowvale, Ontario
- Malton, Ontario
