= Samuel Smith (Upper Canada politician) =

British Army officer and politician

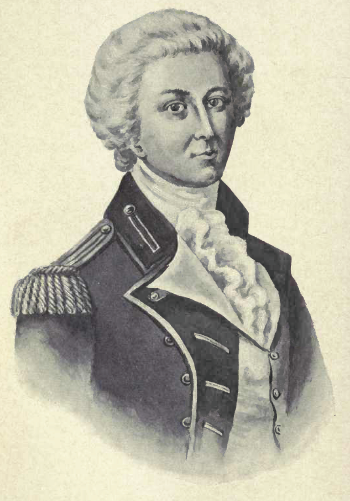

Administrator of the Government of Upper Canada
- In office 11 June 1817 – 13 August 1818
- Monarch: George III
- Preceded by: Sir Frederick Philipse Robinson GCB (acting Governor)
- Succeeded by: Sir Peregrine Maitland KCB GCB
- In office 8 March 1820 – 30 June 1820
- Monarch: George IV
- Preceded by: Sir Peregrine Maitland KCB GCB
- Succeeded by: Sir Peregrine Maitland KCB GCB

Personal details
- Born: 27 December 1756 Hempstead, New York
- Died: 20 October 1826 (aged 69) York, Upper Canada
- Resting place: St James Cemetery
- Spouse: Jane Isabella Clarke

Military service
- Allegiance: United Kingdom
- Branch/service: British Army
- Years of service: 1777–1802
- Rank: Captain, Lieutenant Colonel
- Battles/wars: Battle of Yorktown

Samuel Bois Smith (27 December 1756 – 20 October 1826) was a British Army officer and politician. He was appointed to the Executive Council of Upper Canada and appointed Administrator of Upper Canada.

Smith was born in Hempstead, New York, the son of Scottish immigrants (James Smith). In 1777, he joined the Queen's Rangers during the American Revolutionary War. He surrendered to the Americans after the Battle of Yorktown. Smith moved with the Rangers to Queensbury Parish in the newly created colony of New Brunswick where the Rangers were disbanded. Smith likely met his wife (a native of nearby Maugerville Parish) during this period and then moved to England in 1784 to continue his service in the British Army. He rose to the rank of captain and was sent to Niagara in 1791. He was promoted to the position of lieutenant-colonel of his old regiment (which was recreated in Upper Canada) in 1801 before retiring to 1,000 acres (4 km^{2}) of land he had bought in Etobicoke and also in what is now in Lakeview, Mississauga. Later some of this land was sold to John Strachan for the original Trinity College campus, now Trinity Bellwoods Park. Smith was appointed 30 November 1813 to the Executive Council of Upper Canada for the town of Etobicoke.

In 1817 he was sworn in as Administrator of Upper Canada in the absence of Lieutenant Governor Francis Gore and served until 1818. He acted again as Administrator in the absence of Lieutenant Governor Sir Peregrine Maitland for three months in 1820.

As Administrator, Smith was advised not to grant land to American immigrants until they had taken the oath of allegiance and resided in Upper Canada for seven years. He decided to follow the advice of his Executive Council and not to remove title to the land from those who did not qualify.

Smith was considered a weak official and was the target of complaints by both the reformer Robert Gourlay and the Family Compact member John Strachan, who thought him feeble, inept, and talentless. However, in April 1818, Smith ordered Gourlay arrested when he called an illegal assembly at York (now Toronto).

Smith retired from the Executive Council in October 1825. He died 20 October 1826 in York and left his wife and nine children. His son (Samuel B. Smith Jr.) was Clerk in the Executive Council of the Province of Canada and died in Toronto in 1882.

== Legacy ==
The City of Toronto's Colonel Samuel Smith Park in Etobicoke was created in the 1970s and opened in 1996 along Lake Ontario is named in his honour. The park lands was part of his property (known as Colonel Smith Tract). The Tract in Mississauga was inherited by his son Samuel and sold off by 1872 in what is now Lakeview, Mississauga.

== Smith Estate ==
Following his death, his estate (on Lake Shore Boulevard between 40th and 41st Streets across from Long Branch GO Station) was occupied by his son and later sold. The last owner of the home was James Eastwood and the home was demolished in 1952. It is now a residential community consisting of townhouses, detached homes and apartments.

Government offices
Preceded by Francis Gore	Lieutenant Governor of Upper Canada; 1817–1818	Succeeded by Sir Peregrine Maitland
