= Murder of Alison Parrott =

1986 Murder In Toronto, Canada

Alison Parrott
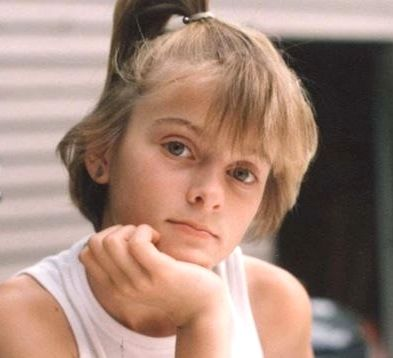
- Born: Alison Parrott; September 28, 1974; Toronto, Ontario, Canada
- Died: July 25, 1986 (aged 11); Etobicoke, Ontario, Canada
- Cause of death: Strangulation
- Burial: Body cremated; remains buried in Mount Pleasant Cemetery, Toronto
- Arrested: Francis Carl Roy
- Convicted of first-degree murder: April 13, 1999

Alison May Campbell Parrott (September 28, 1974 – July 25, 1986) was an 11-year-old Canadian girl who was lured out of her home by a male phone caller in Toronto, Ontario, Canada. Her remains were found two days later in a densely wooded area of Kings Mill Park in Etobicoke.

A decade later, a link analysis helped Toronto homicide detectives match the DNA evidence with a man who was charged with the crime. Francis Carl Roy was convicted of first-degree murder on April 13, 1999. Sentenced to life in prison, he has been eligible for parole since 2021.

== Early life ==
Alison May Campbell Parrott was born on September 28, 1974, in Toronto. Her father, Peter Parrott, was a civil engineer, and her mother, Lesley, was an advertising executive. At the time of her murder, Alison was attending Gabrielle Roy elementary school and frequently used public transit. She was also an avid runner and a member of the Tom Longboat track-and-field club for youth aged 8 to 12. She had won her first race in the summer of 1986, qualifying for the International Youth Track Championships, a youth track-and-field meet to be held in New Jersey on August 1. Her name, along with those of other Toronto qualifiers, was published in the Toronto Star.

== Disappearance ==
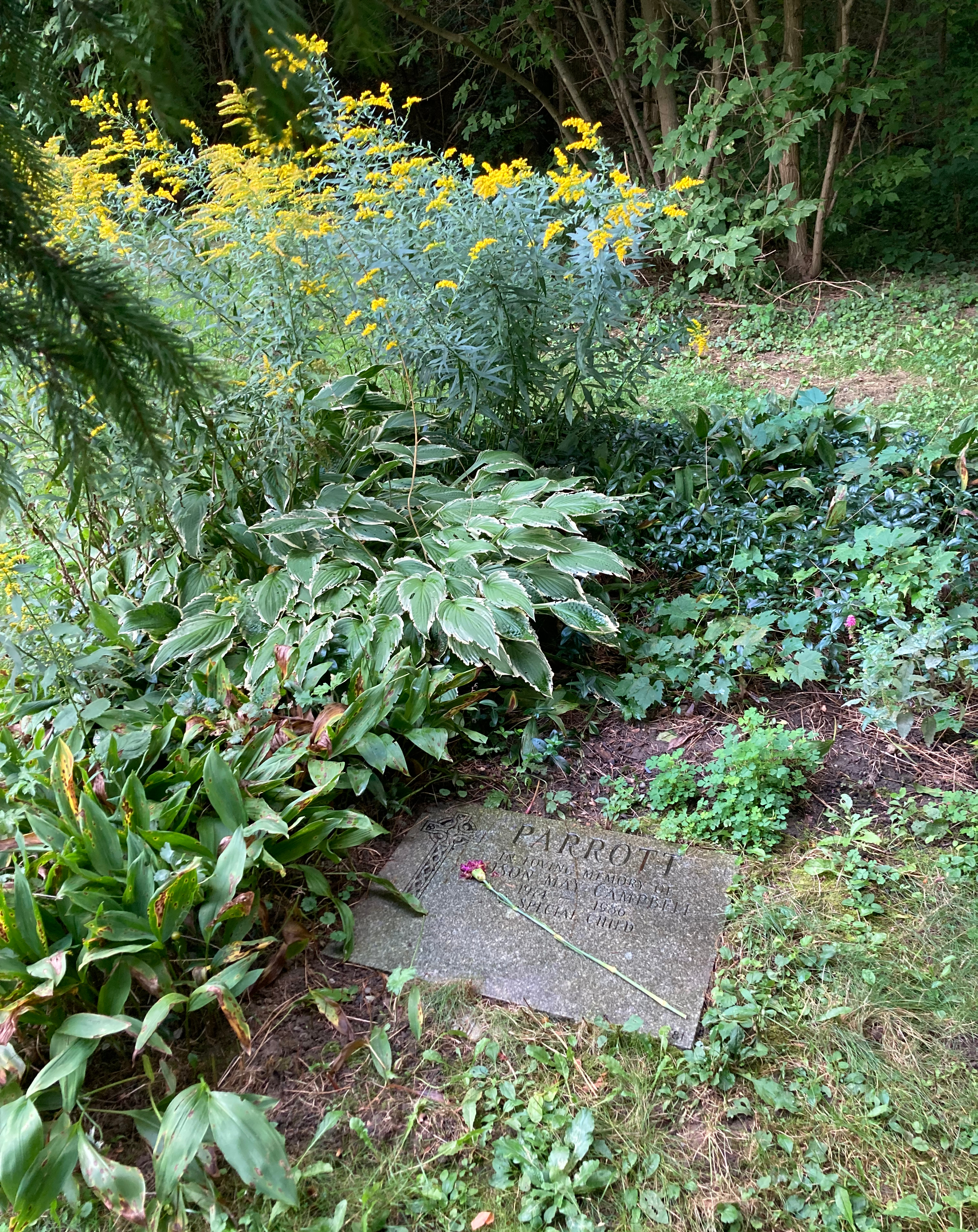
Parrott's grave at Mount Pleasant Cemetery

Shortly before 11 o'clock on the morning of July 25, 1986, Parrott received a phone call at her Summerhill Avenue home in midtown Toronto. A male caller, claiming to be a photographer, asked her to meet him at the University of Toronto's Varsity Stadium where, he said, he would be taking publicity photos of her and her teammates. Alison had trained at the Varsity Stadium sports field the previous fall. No one else was at home when Alison received the call. Alison phoned her mother at work and received permission to attend the photo session. They discussed the route she would take and arranged that she would return home by 2:30 pm. Riders reported seeing her alone on her 20-minute subway route. When Alison failed to return on time, her parents waited until 5 pm to begin inquiring among their friends and neighbours as to her whereabouts. At 6 pm, they called police. Hundreds joined the search in the following days. Parrott's body was found two days later by two boys walking in a densely wooded area of Kings Mill Park, on the Humber River just below the Old Mill subway station; she had been bound, raped, and strangled.

Alison's remains were cremated. Her gravesite is located in Mount Pleasant Cemetery, Toronto. A green space south of David A. Balfour Park, dubbed "The Little Park", is dedicated to Parrott.

== Investigation ==
Police announced a $50,000 reward for information leading to the arrest of the murderer. The investigation initially interviewed 18,000 persons. According to police, the perpetrator had tracked Alison's movements in the weeks leading up to the murder. On July 14, an unidentified male caller had phoned at the house asking to speak to her, but she was out at summer camp and the babysitter had taken a message. The caller had apparently phoned other families with the surname of Parrott in an effort to locate "the Alison Parrott who was going to the International Youth Track Championships in New Jersey". Police speculated that the murderer may have also gathered information about Alison's training patterns at her club.

For a time, police suspected the culprit was a man they sought and called the Scarborough Rapist. When he was identified as Paul Bernardo, the police knew they needed another man because DNA gathered from traces of semen found on Alison's clothes did not match.

== Suspect ==
Francis Carl Roy (born September 18, 1957) was questioned by police during their first round of interviews, as he used the same training facility as Alison's track club, and also because he had a criminal record. Roy was a First Nations man from Manitoulin Island. He was an avid runner with a keen interest in photography and had a criminal record dating back to 1976, including possession of stolen property, petty theft, fraud, assault, breaking and entering, and rape. At the time of Alison's murder, Roy had been on parole after serving only two and a half years of a consecutive 11-year sentence for the rapes of a 14-year-old girl and 19-year-old woman. He moved to Vancouver in 1988 and obtained a job with the city as a youth counselor, claiming to have a degree in psychology from the University of Toronto. He got the job without a background check. After being involved in a bar fight in 1991, he returned to Toronto.

Roy told investigators that he had gone running and then met a friend at a bar at the time of Alison's disappearance. Moreover, when Alison's body was found in July 27, Roy appeared at the police station to confess to assaulting a 20-year-old woman in his apartment two days earlier. In October he pled guilty to this assault and was fined $200, plus the five weeks he had spent in jail.

In 1989, suspicion again fell on Roy when a man arrested in Vancouver informed police that they should consider Roy a suspect in the murders of sex workers in that city earlier that year. Roy was never charged with those crimes, but the two Vancouver officers who had been tipped off did not forget what they were told. In 1996, they gave their information to the Violent Crime Linkage Analysis System (ViCLAS) link analysis database and detectives in Toronto's homicide division picked up the file as part of a cold cases review. Reading over the initial police interview and other reports from Roy's parole officer, they were struck by inconsistencies and deceptions in the suspect's story. The division put a tail on Roy, its officers collecting his DNA from used cigarette butts and a coffee cup in Toronto bars and making a positive match with the DNA found on semen in Alison's body. On July 31, 1996, just over a decade after Alison's murder, Roy was arrested.

== Trial ==
Fearing that the jury would be prejudiced if they possessed certain knowledge about Roy, precluding his right to a fair trial, the trial judge in Roy's case chose not to make it available to the jury, citing a 1988 decision by the Supreme Court of Canada in the process. The withheld evidence included Roy's previous two convictions for rape, the fact that both rapes had been committed on teenagers, and that one of the victims was "tricked, abducted and bound, much like Alison".

=== Defence ===
Three witnesses testified that they had seen Alison in the company of a white man on the morning of her disappearance.

The defence asserted that Roy was not intelligent enough to have committed the crime. Roy's only explanation for the DNA evidence – which matched his semen to that found in Alison's vagina – was that he had discovered Alison's naked body while looking for a place to urinate while on a run in the park. He claimed to have had a sudden urge to stick his finger inside her. Since he had masturbated earlier that day, he said, he still had semen on his fingers.

=== Verdict ===
After a month-long trial and six days of deliberation, on April 13, 1999, the jury returned a verdict of guilty of first-degree murder. Roy was sentenced to automatic life imprisonment without possibility of parole for 25 years.

In 2003, the Court of Appeal for Ontario rejected an appeal by Roy, who claimed that police at his interrogation had denied him his right to remain silent.

== Stay Alert ... Stay Safe ==
In May 1987, Lesley Parrott, aided by colleagues at the advertising agency where she worked, launched the Canada-wide Stay Alert ... Stay Safe program. Aimed at children aged seven through ten, the program's main objective was to attune children's instincts to dangerous situations, whether at home or elsewhere.

Both Alison and her younger brother had attended an all-day "streetproofing" seminar the year before her murder, in which young children receive instruction on how to "avoid potential molesters and abductors".

== Documentaries ==
The fourth episode of season 1 of Cold Case Files, titled "Answer in the Box; Maternal Instinct" (1999), follows the disappearance of Alison and subsequent investigation of the crime.

"Killer in a Box" (1999) was the second episode of season 3 of Exhibit A: Secrets of Forensic Science, a Canadian documentary television program, hosted by Graham Greene, that revisited criminal cases.

Parrott's murder was one of the cases examined in the 2007 documentary Forgiveness: Stories For Our Time.

== See also ==
- Disappearance of Nicole Morin, an 8-year-old Toronto girl who has not been seen since 1985
- List of solved missing person cases: 1950–1999

== Sources ==
- Clark, Doug (2002). Dark paths, cold trails: How a Mountie led the quest to link serial killers to their victims. Harper Collins. ISBN 9780002000789 – via Internet Archive.
