= Coat of arms of Etobicoke =

Heraldic symbol of Etobicoke

- Armiger: Etobicoke
- Adopted: 1977
- Crest: On a wreath of the colours Or and Vert, a Canadian Mural Crown, embattled of six maple leaves Or masoned and veined Sable;
- Shield: Or on a mount Vert a clump of four speckled alders proper;
- Supporters: On the dexter side a representation of a native Indian of the era, on bended knee holding in the dexter hand a bow all proper, and- on the sinister side a figure on bended knee representing Etienne Brule, holding in the sinister hand a musket, all proper;
- Compartment: An escroll Argent the name ETOBICOKE, on the dexter side the word TRADITION, and on the sinister the word PROGRESS, all Sable

The coat of arms of Etobicoke is the heraldic achievement representing the former city of Etobicoke in Toronto. It is set to be removed after being criticized for being racist and stereotypical. Other criticism includes the fact that tradition is aligned under the Indigenous man and so, has a certain narrative. They date back to 1977 and are present in the Etobicoke Civic Centre Council Chamber and outside a separate boardroom in the building.

== History ==
The city of Etobicoke adopted a flag, coat of arms, a seal, and a badge on July 18, 1977. The coat of arms was used mostly in physical form and on numerous documents and mediums. The controversy over the coat of arms began in 2019, when several members of the community suggested to the city staff and politicians that the Indigenous figure was made in a way that could be considered a racist caricature. It is set to be removed after being criticized for being racist and stereotypical as well as that tradition is aligned under the Indigenous man and so, has a certain narrative. The coat of arms are present in the Etobicoke Civic Centre Council Chamber and outside a separate boardroom in the building, but are set to be removed.

== Symbolism ==
The coat of arms depict an Indigenous man on the left, and explorer Étienne Brûlé on the right, the man who discovered the area. Underneath the Indigenous man is written on a scroll "tradition", below the European settler on the right with the word "progress", and under the two men is written ''Etobicoke''. The clump of alders on the shield evokes the etymology of the name of the city: as Etobicoke "place where the alder trees grow").

== Blazon ==
The arms were adopted in 1977, and were blazoned as follows:

Arms: Or on a mount Vert a clump of four speckled alders proper;

Crest: On a wreath of the colours Or and Vert, a Canadian Mural Crown, embattled of six maple leaves Or masoned and veined Sable;

Supporters: On the dexter side a representation of a native Indian of the era, on bended knee holding in the dexter hand a bow all proper, and on the sinister side a figure on bended knee representing Etienne Brule, holding in the sinister hand a musket, all proper;

Compartment: On a compartment consisting of an escroll Argent the name ETOBICOKE, on the dexter side the word TRADITION, and on the sinister the word PROGRESS, all Sable.

== Heraldic badge ==
The badge of Etobicoke was adopted on July 18, 1977, the same year than the arms. It was the principal identifying mark of the municipality because of its wide usage, since the coat of arms were reserved for official documents. The heraldic badge, as adopted in 1977, was blazoned as follows:

An Alder Leaf Vert veined Sable enfiled on a torse of the colours Or and Vert, a Canadian Mural Crown embattled of six Maple Leaves Or, masoned and veined Sable, beneath the leaf on an escroll Argent the name ETOBICOKE Sable.
