= Ontario Highway 409 =

Controlled-access highway in Ontario

Highway 409
- Belfield Expressway

Route information
- Maintained by Ministry of Transportation of Ontario; Greater Toronto Airports Authority
- Length: 5.6 km (3.5 mi)
- Existed: August 25, 1978–present

Major junctions
- West end: Pearson Airport
- Highway 427
- East end: Highway 401 – Toronto

Location
- Country: Canada
- Province: Ontario

Highway system
- Ontario provincial highways; Current; Former; 400-series
← 407 ETR / Highway 407	→ Highway 410

King's Highway 409, commonly referred to as Highway 409 and historically as the Belfield Expressway, is a 400-series highway in the Canadian province of Ontario that extends from Highway 401 in Toronto to Pearson International Airport, west of Highway 427, in Mississauga. It is a short freeway used mainly as a spur route for traffic travelling to the airport or Highway 427 northbound from Highway 401 westbound (and vice versa), as these route movements are not accommodated at the complex interchange between Highways 401 and 427.

Planning for Highway 409 took place in the late 1960s amidst considerable controversy around its originally proposed path through the historic town of Malton. Eventually, the route was changed to provide access to the airport instead of northward towards Brampton and was completed through the mid-1970s, opening in 1978. The significance of the route has increased over the years alongside expansion of the airport. In 2000, the Greater Toronto Airports Authority (GTAA) purchased the section of the highway west of Highway 427 in order to modify the ramps leading into the airport.

The original name of the freeway was derived from Belfield Road, which runs parallel to and north of the highway in Toronto from Kipling Avenue to Atwell Drive.

The speed limit is 100 km/h (62 mph) east of Highway 427 and 80 km/h (50 mph) west of it. The route is patrolled by the Ontario Provincial Police (OPP) east of the Toronto–Peel boundary and by the Peel Regional Police to the west of it and is maintained by the Ministry of Transportation of Ontario (MTO) east of Highway 427 and by the GTAA west of it.

== Route description ==
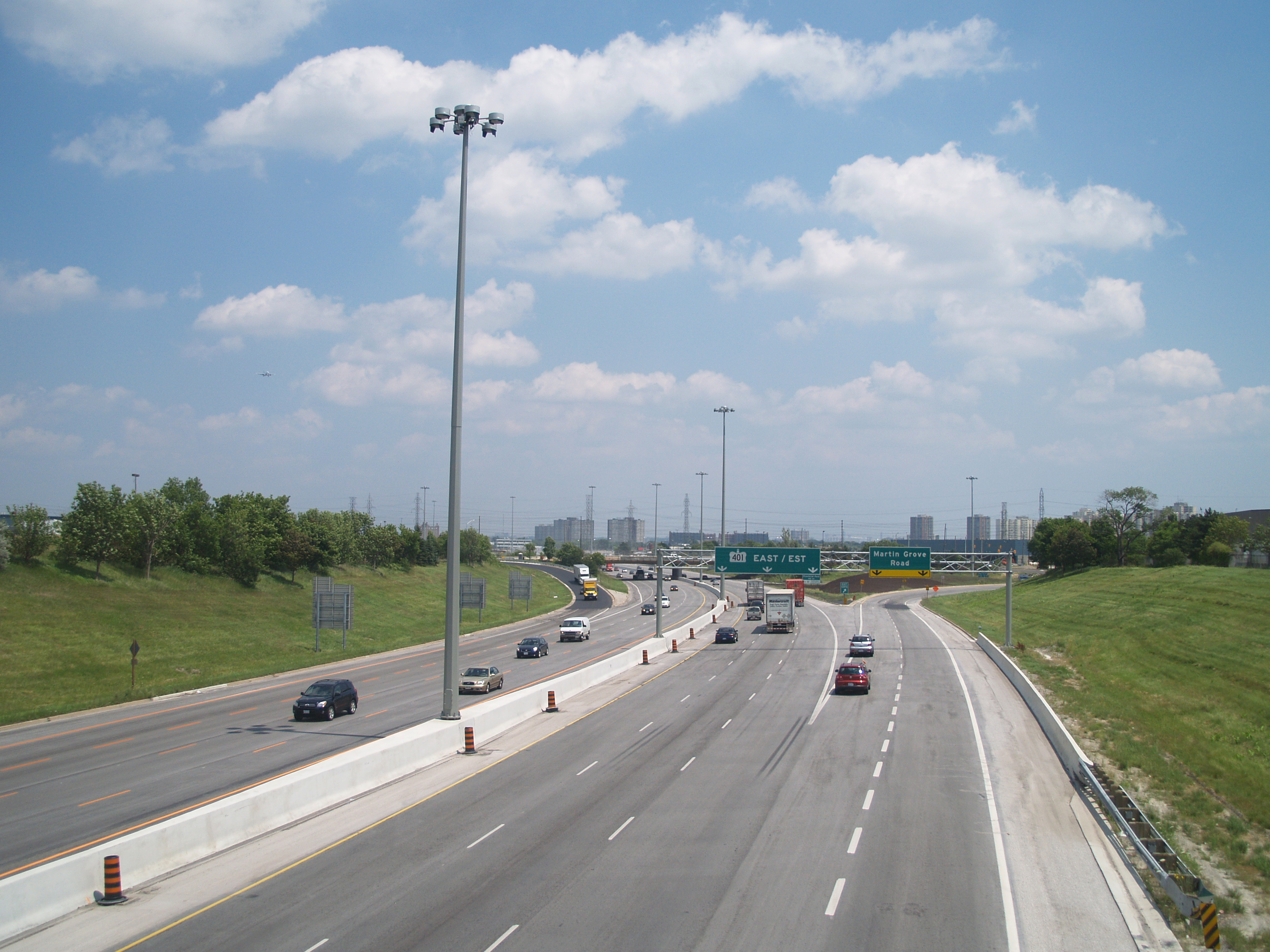
Looking east on the 409 approaching the interchange with Martin Grove Road, after the 2009-10 reconstruction

Highway 409 serves as a direct link between Highway 401, Highway 427, and Pearson International Airport. While it is not intended as a commuter route, there are three exits serving industrial areas in Etobicoke centred on the highway. Highway 409 also serves as the only connection between westbound Highway 401 and northbound Highway 427 and between southbound Highway 427 and eastbound Highway 401, as access between these routes is not provided at the 401–427 interchange.

Highway 409 begins at Airport Road as the knotted flyovers from Pearson International Airport converge into the freeway from the various terminals. The highway then turns northeast and encounters Highway 427. Through this section to Highway 427, the highway is maintained by the Greater Toronto Airport Authority (GTAA) and has a posted speed limit of 60 kilometres per hour (37 mph).

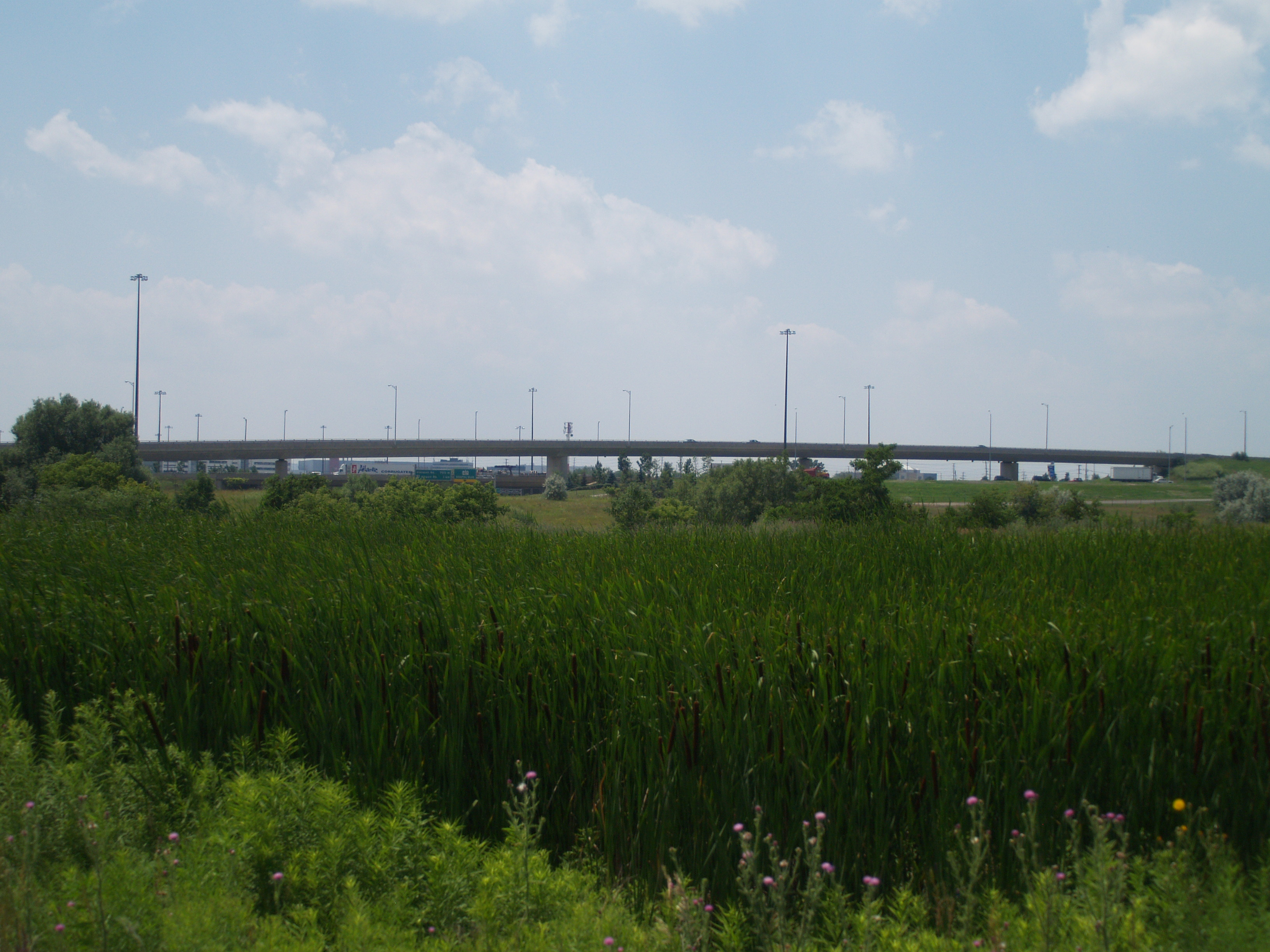
The flyover from Highway 427 to Highway 409 was constructed in 1992, replacing an at-grade signalized intersection.

As the highway passes under Highway 427, it turns southeast and takes on an east–west orientation. It passes over Carlingview Drive, and begins to descend into a trench, passing beneath Highway 27, two CN railway spurs, and Iron Street before returning to level grade. Around the interchange with Martin Grove Road, the freeway twists slightly to the north and south between factories and warehouses.

At its eastern terminus, the eastbound Highway 409 crosses Kipling Avenue and two of its lanes merge onto each of the Highway 401 express and collector lanes. From Highway 401 westbound, two westbound collector lanes diverge and become the westbound lanes of Highway 409, while the remaining three westbound collector lanes join up with the westbound Highway 401 express lanes to form six lanes west of there. Highway 409 is also accessible from Highway 401 westbound express lanes.

== History ==
Plans for Highway 409, originally known as the Belfield Expressway, were first presented in 1965 to the Peel County (now Peel Region) council. In September 1968, three possible routes were submitted to the council. At the time, the town of Malton, within Peel County, occupied the area of the planned expressway, having not yet been amalgamated with municipalities within Peel County to the south to create the City of Mississauga. The 45-metre-wide (148 ft) strip of land would require the expropriation and demolition of 50 houses, as well as several businesses, a school, and two community parks. Citizens of the village formed a group to protest the freeway and to demand another route be taken. An above-grade alternative, similar to the Gardiner Expressway was proposed, as well as a tunnel under the airport.

Aerial photo (with north at the bottom) showing at-grade signalized intersection from 427 southbound to 409 eastbound.

However, at the same time, Toronto was embroiled in heated debate over the fate of its planned urban expressway system. When the Spadina Expressway was cancelled in 1971, the planned Belfield Expressway was completely revised. Instead of continuing northwest from Highway 427 and through Malton's four-corners at Derry Road and Airport Road towards Brampton, it would curve southwest and provide access to the developing Toronto International Airport. At the recently opened interchange between Highway 401 and Highway 427, the off-ramp from westbound Highway 401 to Carlingview Drive was temporarily signed as "Airport Expressway", since Carlingview Drive had a temporary on-ramp to northbound Highway 427 near the Renforth Drive underpass but that on-ramp was closed in the early 1970s. Direct access from westbound Highway 401 to northbound Highway 427 would be restored a few years later with the Belfield Expressway which had greater capacity then the short-lived Carlingview ramps.

Before plans for the new route were finalized, a flyover was built to provide access from Belfield Road to eastbound Highway 401, opening on October 7, 1968. Because the lands on which the freeway was to be built were occupied, the province elected to apply to expropriate the right-of-way in April 1972. Construction was underway by the end of the year, with the first contracts constructing the trench section near Highway 27. Structures, drainage and grading were completed west of Iron Street to Carlingview Avenue in 1974. In June of that year, contracts were awarded for the same work east of Iron Street to Highway 401. When this was completed in 1975, a paving contract was awarded from Carlingview Avenue to Highway 401.

Highway 409 first opened to traffic by 1976, with temporary ramps at Carlingview Avenue acting as the western terminus. That year the final contracts were awarded to construct portions of the Highway 427 interchange and connect Highway 409 with the airport road system. The entire freeway opened on August 25, 1978.

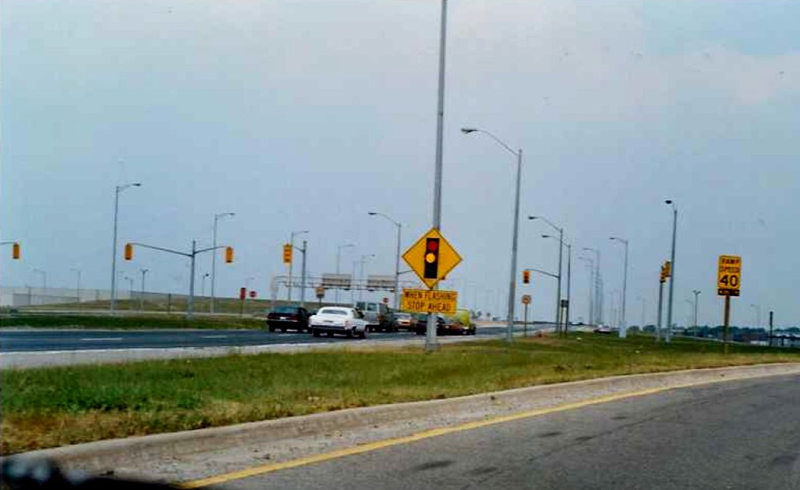
The at-grade signalized intersection of the Highway 427-409 junction in 1989

The flyover ramp, which connects southbound Highway 427 with eastbound Highway 409 was constructed in the early 1990s. Prior to that, an at-grade intersection crossed the northbound lanes of Highway 427, controlled by a traffic signal. This signal had the longest cycle of any traffic light in Toronto during its years of operation.

The portion of Highway 409 west of Highway 427 is owned and operated by the Greater Toronto Airports Authority (GTAA). Despite its private ownership, the section east of Airport Road is still considered a part of Highway 409. The GTAA purchased this section of the highway in 2000 in order to rebuild the approaches to the new Terminal 1 at Toronto Pearson Airport.

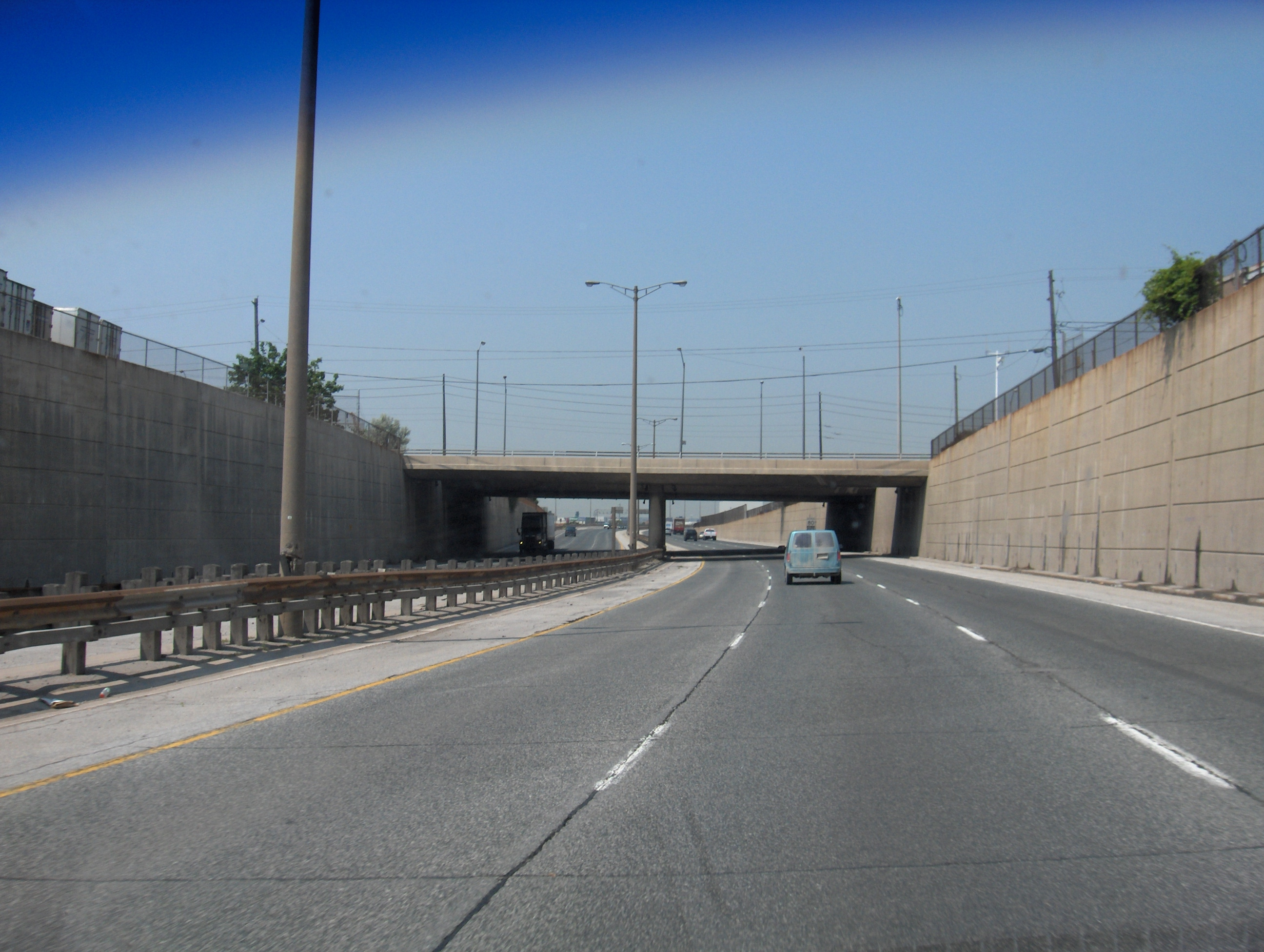
Highway 409 westbound approaching Highway 27 overpass in 2007, prior to 2008 reconstruction.

Until 2008, Highway 409 remained almost unchanged from its original construction. However, beginning on July 10, 2008, traffic access was restricted to the outermost lanes. The steel "W" guardrail and truss light posts in the median were replaced by an Ontario Tall Wall barrier with a high-mast lighting system. Construction was carried out over several years and was scheduled for completion on September 1, 2011.

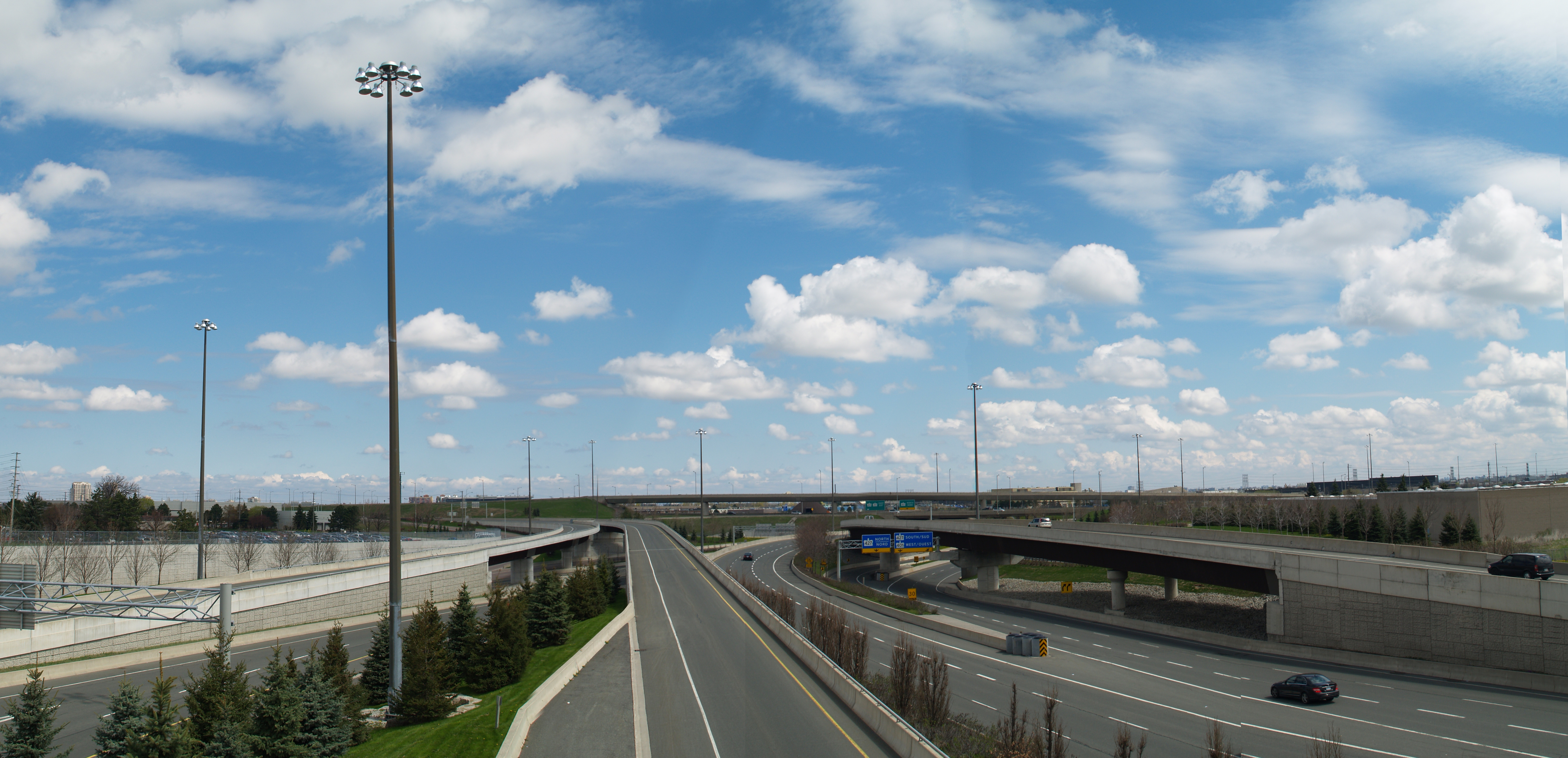
Highway 409's western terminus at Pearson Airport as viewed from Network Road, with the Highway 427 interchange in the background.

== Exit list ==
The following table lists the major junctions along Highway 409, as noted by the Ministry of Transportation of Ontario. All exits are unnumbered.

Division	Location	km	mi	Destinations	Notes
Peel	Mississauga	0.0	0.0	Toronto Pearson International Airport	No access to Viscount Road from Terminal 1, arrivals level, or Terminal 3
Peel	Mississauga	0.0	0.0	Regional Road 7 (Airport Road)	No eastbound exit; no access to Terminal 1 from westbound entrance; no access to Viscount Road and Network Road from eastbound entrance
Peel	Mississauga	0.3	0.19	Viscount Road	No westbound entrance; no access to and from Network Road
Peel	Mississauga	0.8	0.50	Network Road	Eastbound exit and westbound entrance; no access to and from Viscount Road, Airport Road
Peel–Toronto boundary	Mississauga–Toronto boundary	1.4	0.87	Highway 427	No westbound entrance from northbound Highway 427; westbound ramps to Viscount Road and Airport Road; Highway 427 exit 13
Toronto		2.6	1.6	Attwell Drive	Eastbound exit and westbound entrance
Toronto		4.1	2.5	Martin Grove Road	
Toronto		5.2	3.2	Belfield Road, Kipling Avenue	Westbound exit and eastbound entrance
Toronto		5.6	3.5	Highway 401 east	Westbound exit and eastbound entrance to/from Highway 401; Highway 401 exit 355
1.000 mi = 1.609 km; 1.000 km = 0.621 mi: Incomplete access
