= Etobicoke =

Former city in Ontario, Canada

- Dissolved city (lower-tier)
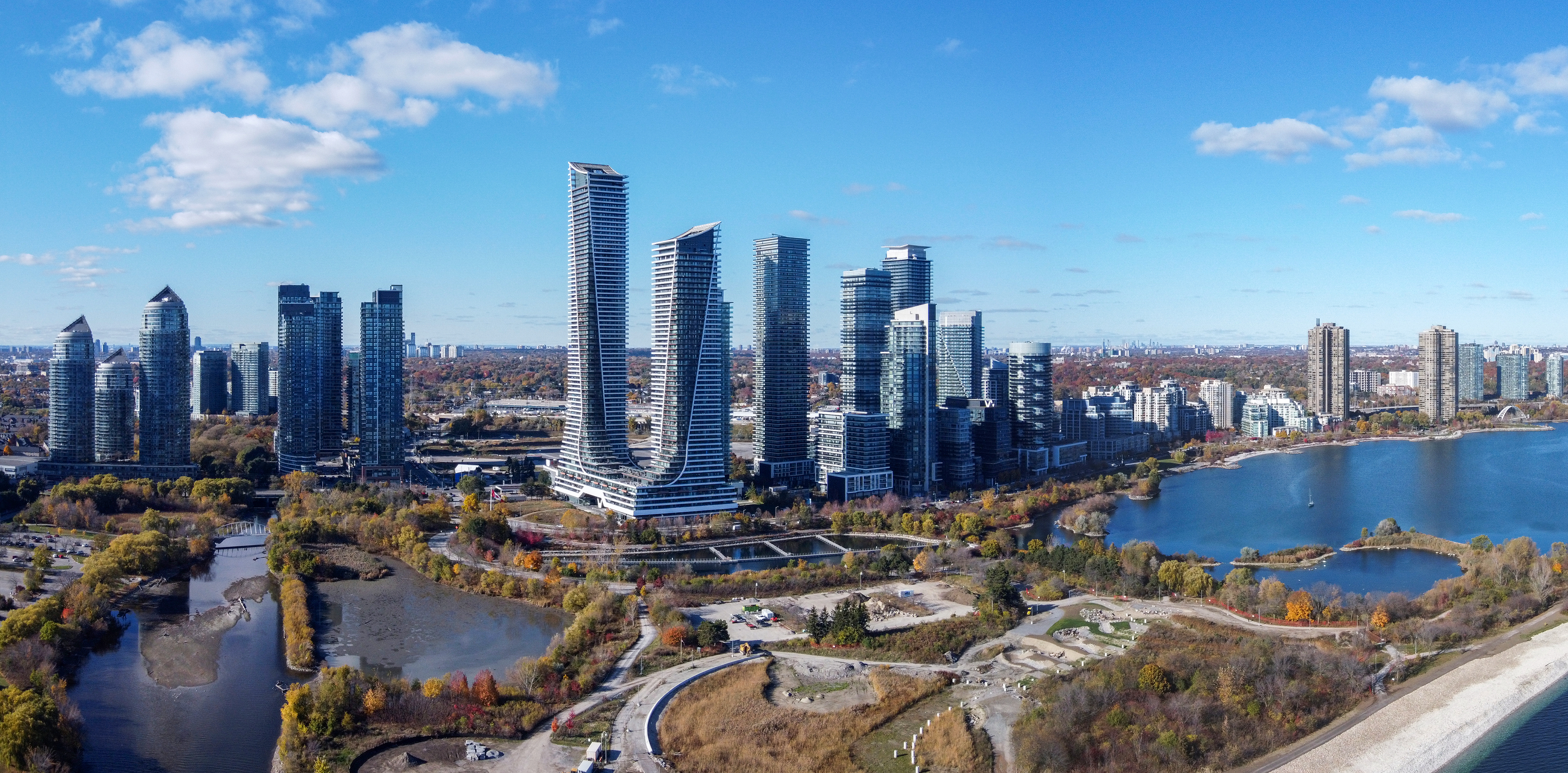
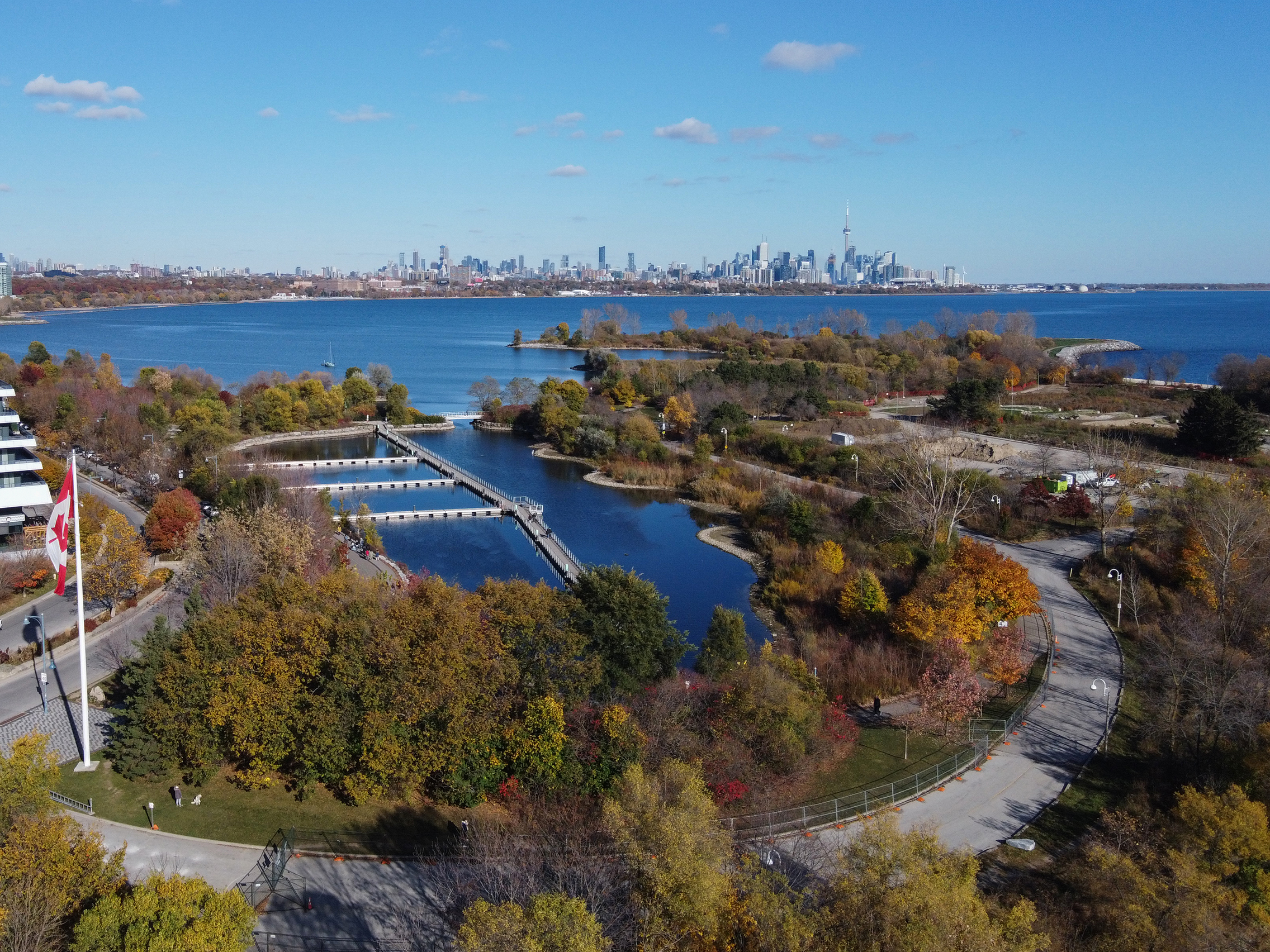
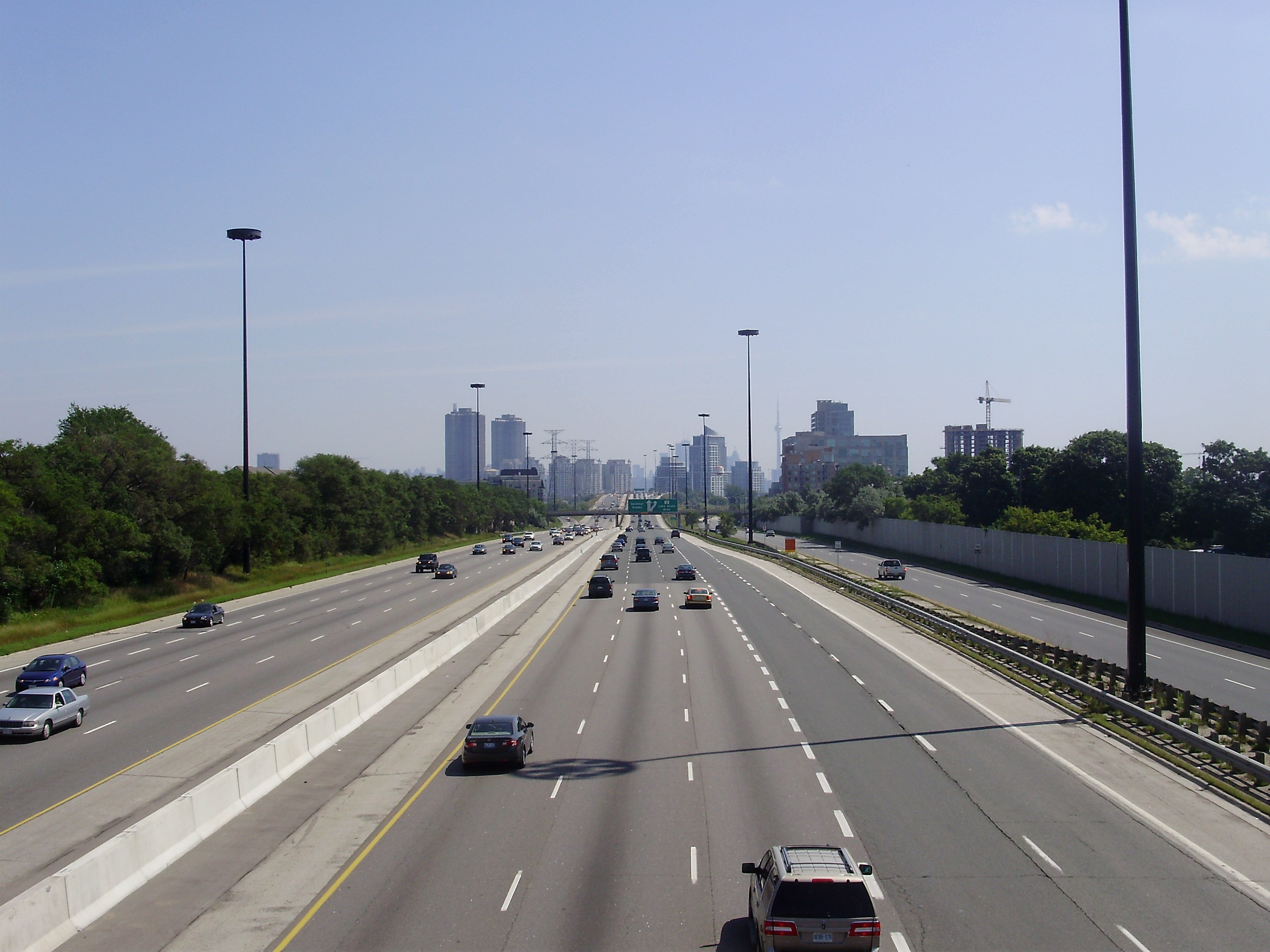
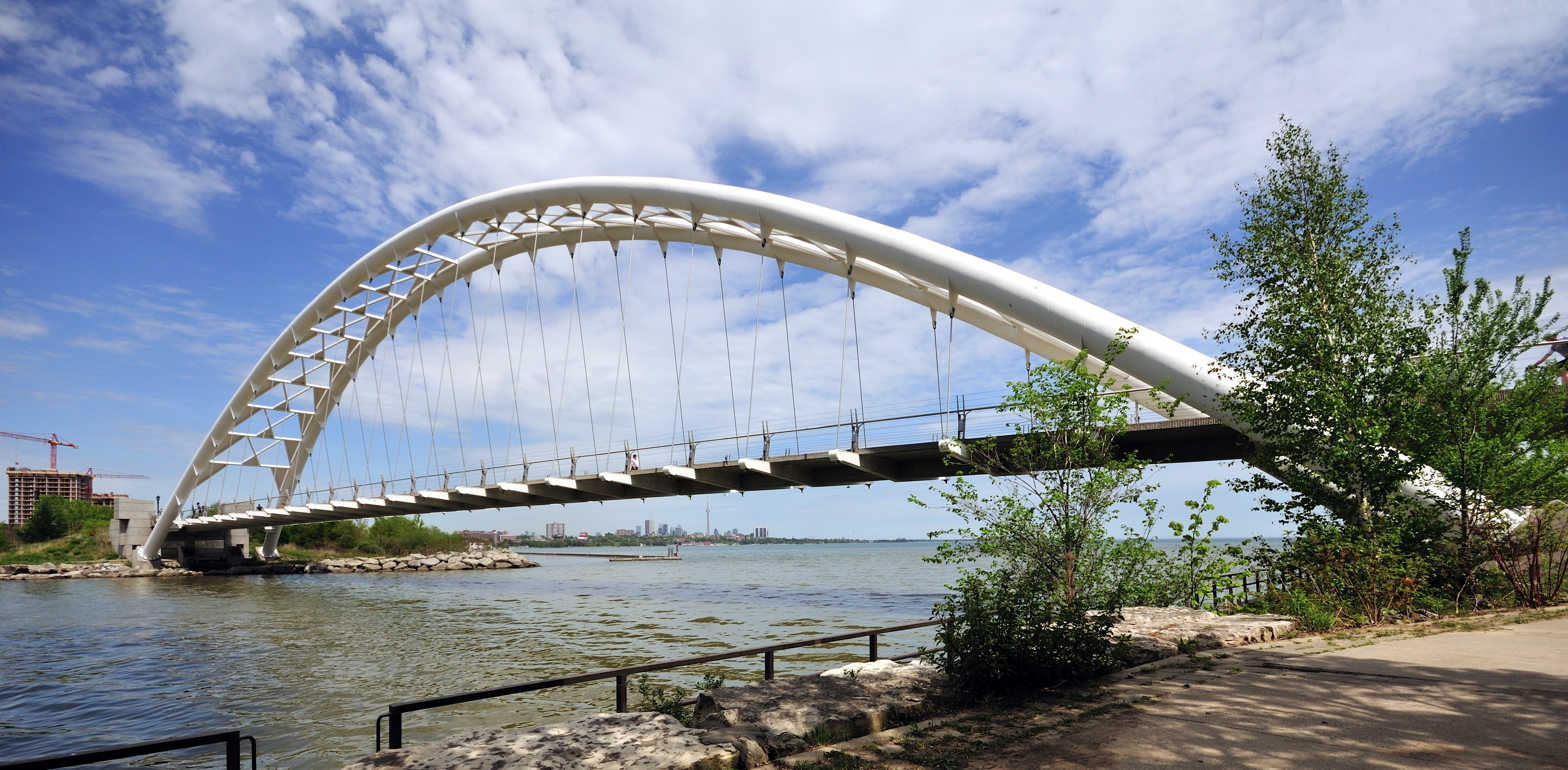
- From top, left to right: Humber Bay Park East, Downtown Toronto from Humber Park, Gardiner Expressway from Royal York Road, Humber Bay Arch Bridge

- Flag Seal Coat of arms
- Motto: "The Leading Edge of Metro"
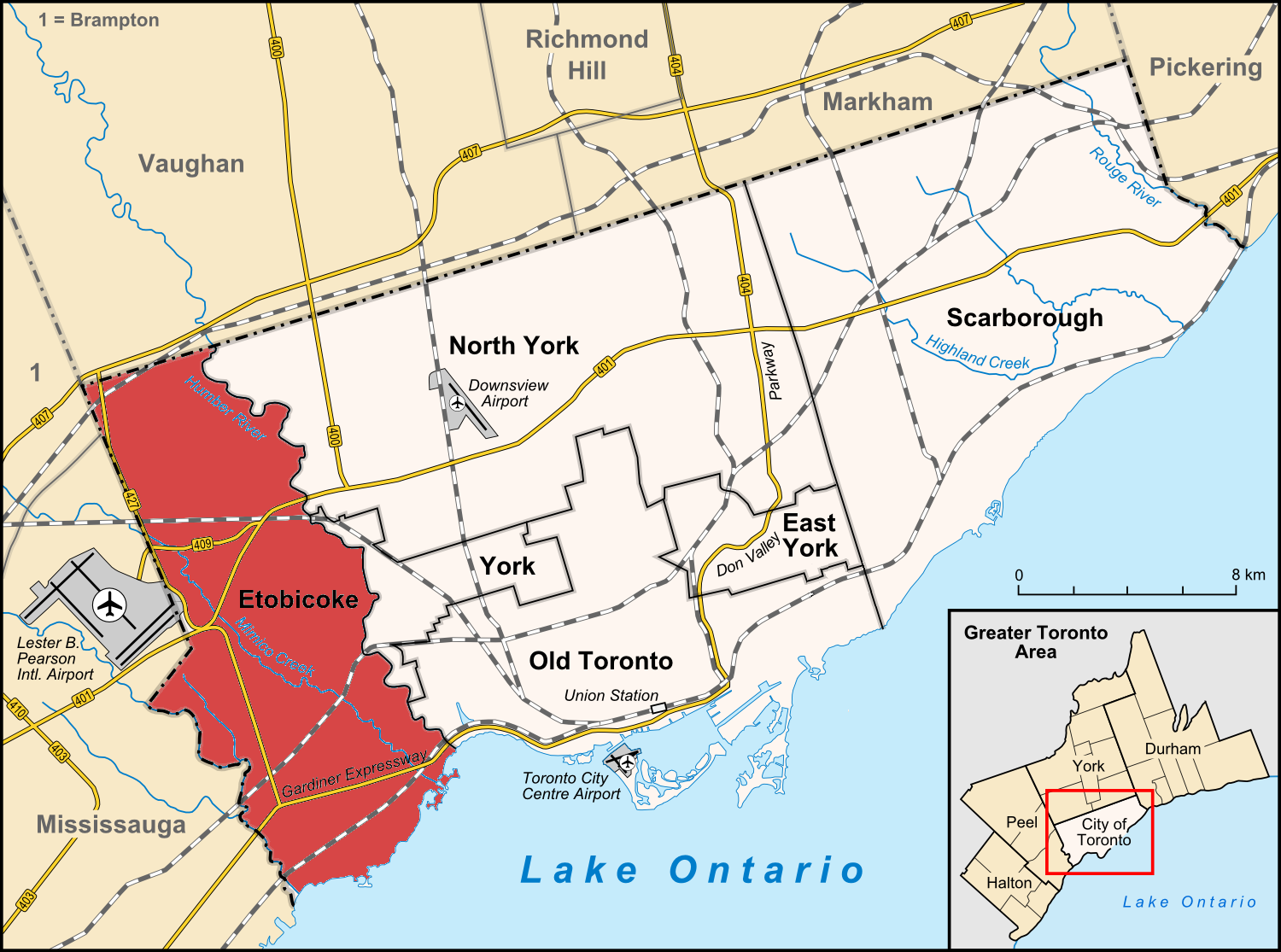
- Location of Etobicoke (red) compared to the rest of Toronto.
- Interactive map of Etobicoke
- Coordinates: 43°36′58″N 79°30′45″W
- Country: Canada
- Province: Ontario
- Municipality: Toronto
- Incorporated: January 1, 1850 (township); January 1, 1967 (borough); June 1983 (city)
- Changed Region: 1954 Metropolitan Toronto from York County
- Amalgamated: January 1, 1998 into Toronto

Government
  - Councillors: Vincent Crisanti; Stephen Holyday; Amber Morley
  - MPs: John Zerucelli (L); Yvan Baker (L); James Maloney (L)
  - MPPs: Doug Ford (PC); Kinga Surma (PC); Lee Fairclough (OLP)

Area^{[1]}
  - Total: 123.93 km^{2} (47.85 sq mi)

Population (2021)^{[1]}
  - Total: 376,237
  - Density: 3,035.9/km^{2} (7,863/sq mi)
- Demonym: Etobian
- Time zone: UTC-5 (EST)
  - Summer (DST): UTC-4 (EDT)
- Postal code span: M8V-M9C, M9P-M9R, M9V-M9W
- Area codes: 416, 647, 437

Etobicoke (/ɛˈtoʊbɪkoʊ/, eh-TOH-bik-oh) is a former city within Toronto, Ontario, Canada. Comprising the city's west end, Etobicoke is bordered on the south by Lake Ontario, on the east by the Humber River, on the west by Etobicoke Creek, the cities of Brampton, and Mississauga, the Toronto Pearson International Airport (a small portion of the airport extends into Etobicoke), and on the north by the city of Vaughan at Steeles Avenue West.

The area of Etobicoke was first settled by Europeans in the 1790s. Primarily an agricultural district, it was incorporated in 1850 as Etobicoke Township. The municipality grew into city status in the 20th century after World War II. Several independent villages and towns developed and became part of Etobicoke, first when Metropolitan Toronto was formed in 1954 and later, in a 1967 consolidation. In 1998, its city status and government dissolved after it was amalgamated into present-day Toronto.

Etobicoke has a highly diverse population, which numbered 365,143 in 2016. It is primarily suburban in development and heavily industrialized, resulting in a lower population density than the other districts of Toronto. Much of its cityscape is characterized by larger main streets, shopping malls, and cul-de-sac housing developments. Etobicoke has several expressways, including Highways 427, 401, 409, the Queen Elizabeth Way and Gardiner Expressway. Etobicoke is the western terminus of Line 2 Bloor-Danforth of the Toronto subway and is served by four suburban rail stations of GO Transit. Humber Polytechnic is in Etobicoke, encompassing two campuses, one of which is also home to the University of Guelph-Humber.

== Toponymy ==
The name Etobicoke derives from the Mississauga word wah-do-be-kang (wadoopikaang), meaning "place where the alders grow". This was how they described the area between Etobicoke Creek and the Humber River. The first provincial land surveyor, Augustus Jones, also spelled it as ato-be-coake. Etobicoke was finally adopted as the official name in 1795 at the direction of Upper Canada Lieutenant Governor John Graves Simcoe.

== History ==
At different times throughout history, different groups of First Nations peoples used the land that is now present day Etobicoke. As the Algonquins gradually moved west from the Atlantic to Lake Erie, it is almost certain they would have occupied this land. By the time they were mostly settled on the shores of Georgian Bay, the Wendat were the primary residents of Lake Ontario's north shore. During the 17th century, the powerful Haudenosaunee (Iroquois) confederacy, made up of nations based to the south of the lake, pushed them out.

After continued harassment from the Haudenosaunee to the south, a coalition of the Ojibwe, Odawa, and Potawatomi Algonquin nations, known as the Three Fires, gradually pushed the Haudenosaunee off this land. The Algonquian-speaking Mississaugas settled here by 1695, fishing and growing crops more locally in the summer and hunting farther afield in the winter.

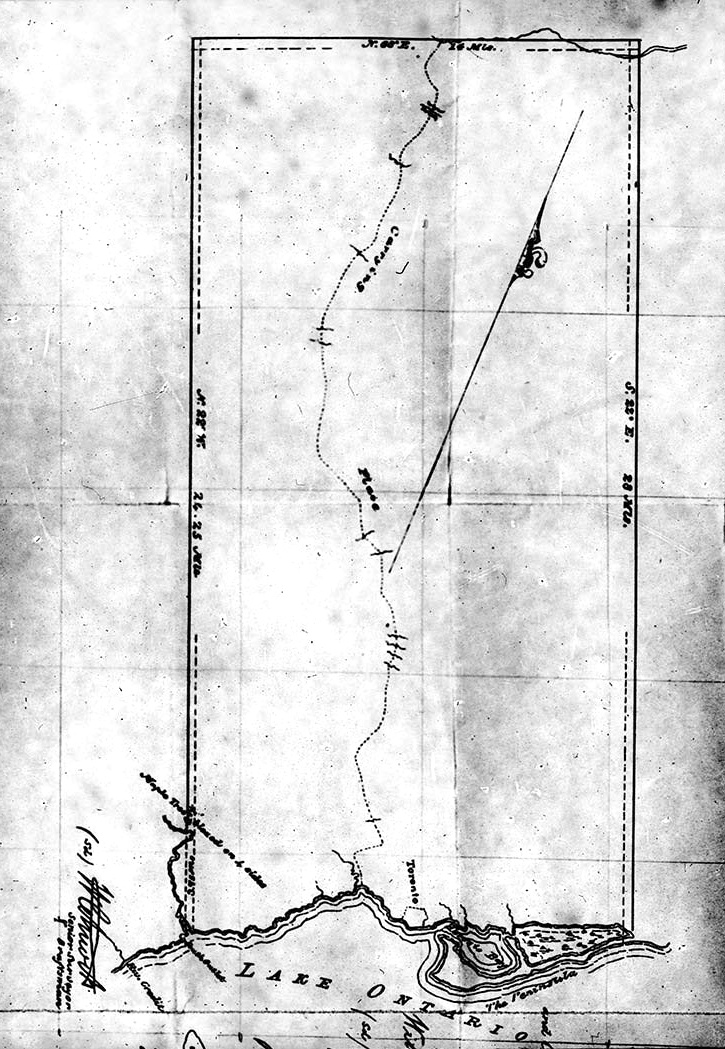
A map depicting the Toronto Purchase in 1787. The inclusion of Etobicoke in the purchase was contested until 2010, when the dispute was settled between the Government of Canada and the Mississaugas.

The British officials intended Etobicoke to be included in the Toronto Purchase of 1787. However, the Mississauga and government disagreed as to whether the western boundary of the purchase was the Humber River or the Etobicoke River (now, Etobicoke Creek). The Mississauga Indians allowed British surveyor Alexander Aitkin to survey the disputed land, and the British paid an additional 10 shillings for the purchase, although the purchase was never formally agreed to. The dispute was settled between the government and the Mississauga First Nation in 2010.

The Canada Act of Britain in 1791 allowed the formation of counties, towns and townships. The south-west section of York County was surveyed and Simcoe approved its designation as Etobicoke township in 1795. It was administered by the York County government. The boundaries of the new township were the Humber River, Lake Ontario, Etobicoke Creek, Toronto Township (today's City of Mississauga), Toronto Gore (that part of Mississauga and Brampton in the area of today's Pearson Airport), and Vaughan Township, now the City of Vaughan.

Immigrants from the British Isles were among the new settlers, as well as Loyalists who had left the rebellious Thirteen Colonies, by then the United States. Early settlers included many of the Queen's Rangers, who Simcoe gave land to help protect the new capital of Upper Canada and develop this frontier area. In 1793-95, the Honourable Samuel Smith, a colonel in the Queen's Rangers, received land grants of 1,530 acres (6.2 km^{2}), extending from today's Kipling Avenue to Etobicoke Creek, and north to Bloor Street.

On March 18, 1797, Sergeant Patrick Mealey received the first land patent for a plot on the west side of Royal York Road on Lake Ontario. This was part of the First Military Tract, or "Militia Lands", which extended from today's Royal York Road to Kipling Avenue, south from Bloor Street. The Crown was providing land to Loyalists in compensation for property they left behind in the U.S. and to veterans of the American Revolution in payment for service. In other parts of Ontario, the Crown granted land to the Haudenosaunee who had served as allies during the war and were forced to cede most of their land in New York to the state. The Crown granted more land to members of the Queen's Rangers in the First Military tract, but most did not occupy their land. Many sold their acreage after a short time.

The census of 1805 counted 84 people in Etobicoke. In 1806, William Cooper built a grist mill and saw mill on the Humber river's west bank, just south of Dundas Street. The 1809 census counted 137 residents. The first Dundas Street bridge over the Humber River at Lambton Mills was built in 1811, making the township more accessible from York.

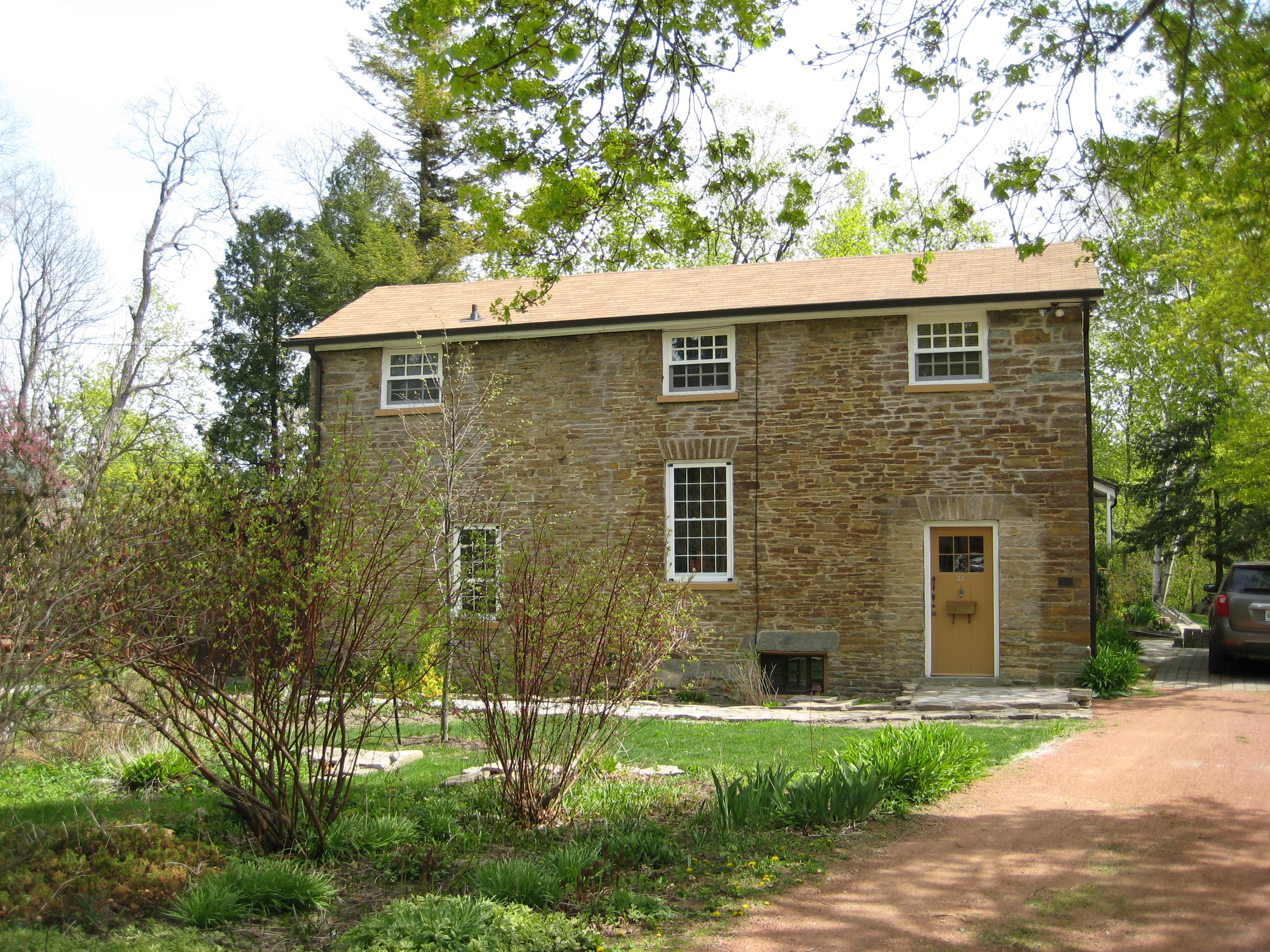
John Grubb's House, built in 1832. Grubb helped found the community of Thistletown in present-day Etobicoke.

On May 18, 1846, the Albion Road Company was incorporated. Its purpose was to build and maintain a road to the north-west corner of Etobicoke, where a new community was planned. At the same time, John Grubb, who had already founded Thistletown, hired land surveyor John Stoughton Dennis to plan a community at the intersection of Islington Avenue and Albion Road, to be named Saint Andrew's. Plan 6 for this community was registered on October 15, 1847. The French master of Upper Canada College, Jean du Petit Pont de la Haye, contracted land surveyor James McCallum Jr. to create a plan for the community planned by the Albion Road Company, and Plan 28 was registered for Claireville on October 12, 1849.

The township of Etobicoke was incorporated on January 1, 1850. The first meeting of the town council was held on January 21. Present at the meeting were reeve William Gamble, vice-reeve W. B. Wadsworth and aldermen Moses Appleby, Thomas Fisher, and John Geddes. The council convened monthly meetings at a variety of places. In 1850, the township's population was 2904. By 1881, the population of Etobicoke township was 2976.

In 1911, the community of Mimico was incorporated on land taken from Etobicoke township. New Toronto was incorporated on January 1, 1913. Early on, there was talk of merging Mimico and New Toronto. A 1916 referendum on amalgamating the two communities was approved by the residents of Mimico, but rejected by residents of New Toronto. In 1917, Mimico became a town and in 1920, New Toronto became the Town of New Toronto. Long Branch was incorporated in 1930 as a village.

In 1954, Etobicoke Township became a part of the newly formed regional government, the Municipality of Metropolitan Toronto ("Metro"). In 1967, the township of Etobicoke was merged with three small lakeside municipalities — the Village of Long Branch, the Town of New Toronto, and the Town of Mimico — to form the Borough of Etobicoke. The borough was reincorporated as a city in 1984. In 1998, six local municipalities (including Etobicoke) and the Metropolitan Toronto government merged to form the amalgamated city of Toronto.

== Character ==
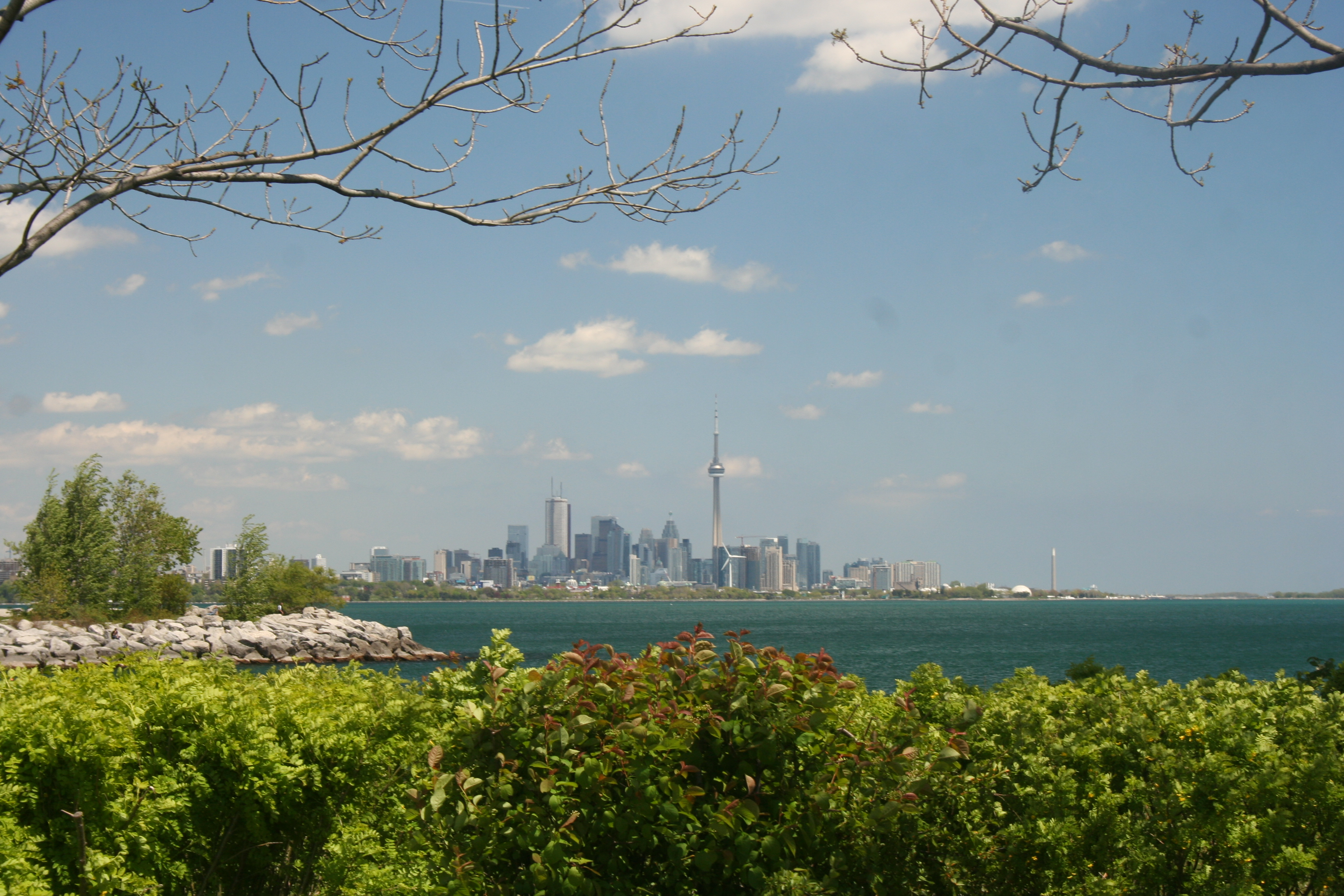
Humber Bay Park is one of several municipal urban parks in Etobicoke.

Etobicoke has the lowest population density of the former cities and boroughs comprising the city of Toronto. This is mainly due to its expanses of industrial lands along the various expressways.

The residential areas are primarily single-family dwellings, although several large multi-story high-rise condominium developments have been built in south Etobicoke near the Humber River. The central and northern areas of Etobicoke have many high-density apartment complexes set in the middle of sizable, open fields and parks. The central/southern areas, such as Markland Wood, The Kingsway, New Toronto, Mimico and Long Branch, have large green spaces, many parks, and main street shopping areas.

Etobicoke has many public parks. Located on the banks of the Humber River, James Gardens, a popular site for wedding photography, features seasonal flowers, walkways, a rock garden, streams, and waterfalls. Etobicoke also has Centennial Park, a large recreational park, and Colonel Samuel Smith Park and Humber Bay Park on the lakeshore. Etobicoke has several golf courses. St. George's Golf and Country Club was ranked in 2007 as one of the three best golf courses in Canada.

=== Neighbourhoods ===
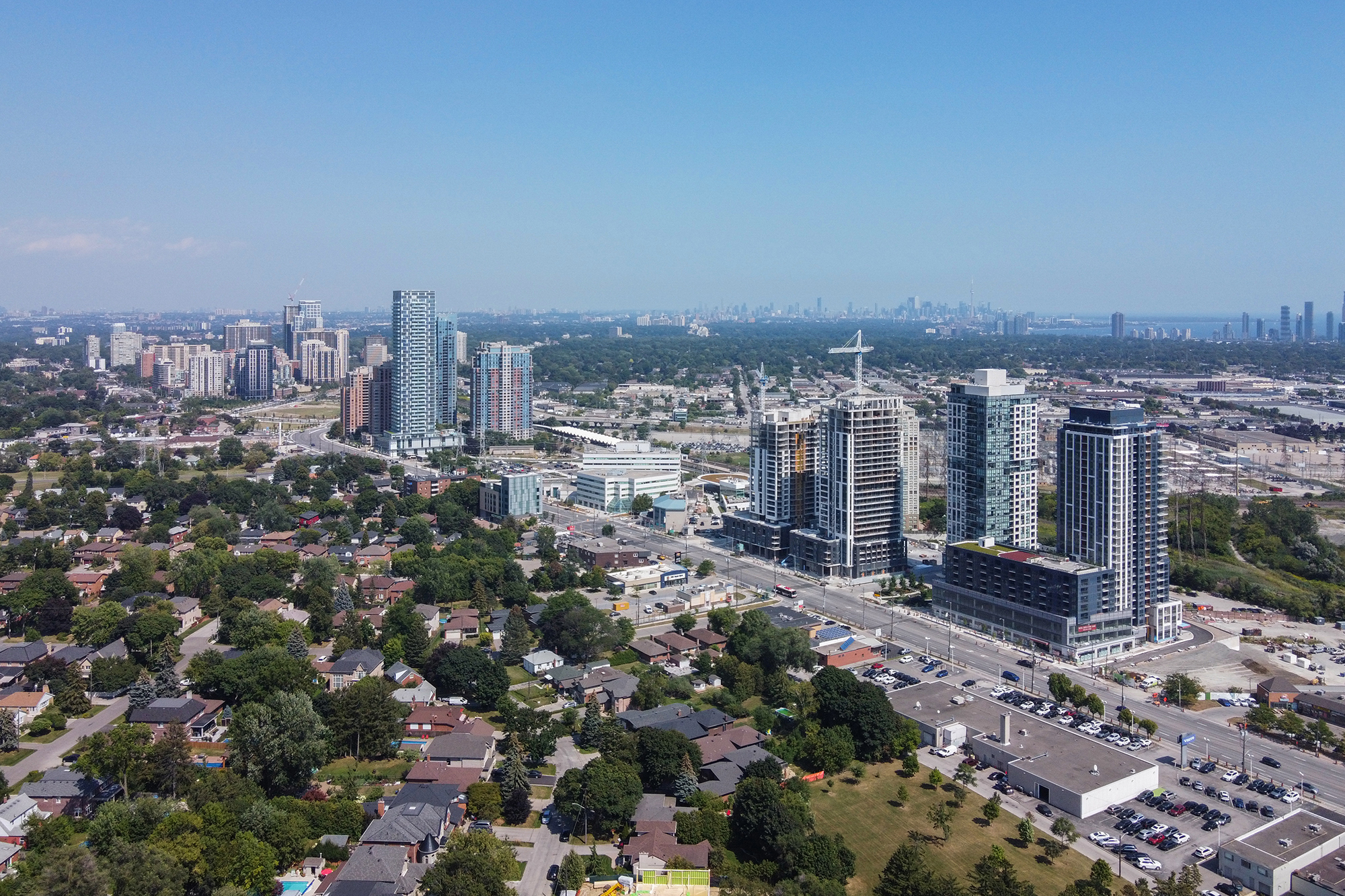
New condos in Islington-City Centre West (2021)

Etobicoke is generally divided into three large areas roughly corresponding to its political ridings. Each has neighbourhoods, mostly developments of 19th-century 'postal villages' (rural neighbourhoods), that were built at key points along the early roads and railways; especially the three former 'Lakeshore Municipalities' that separated from Etobicoke in the early 20th century and Etobicoke's central Islington community:

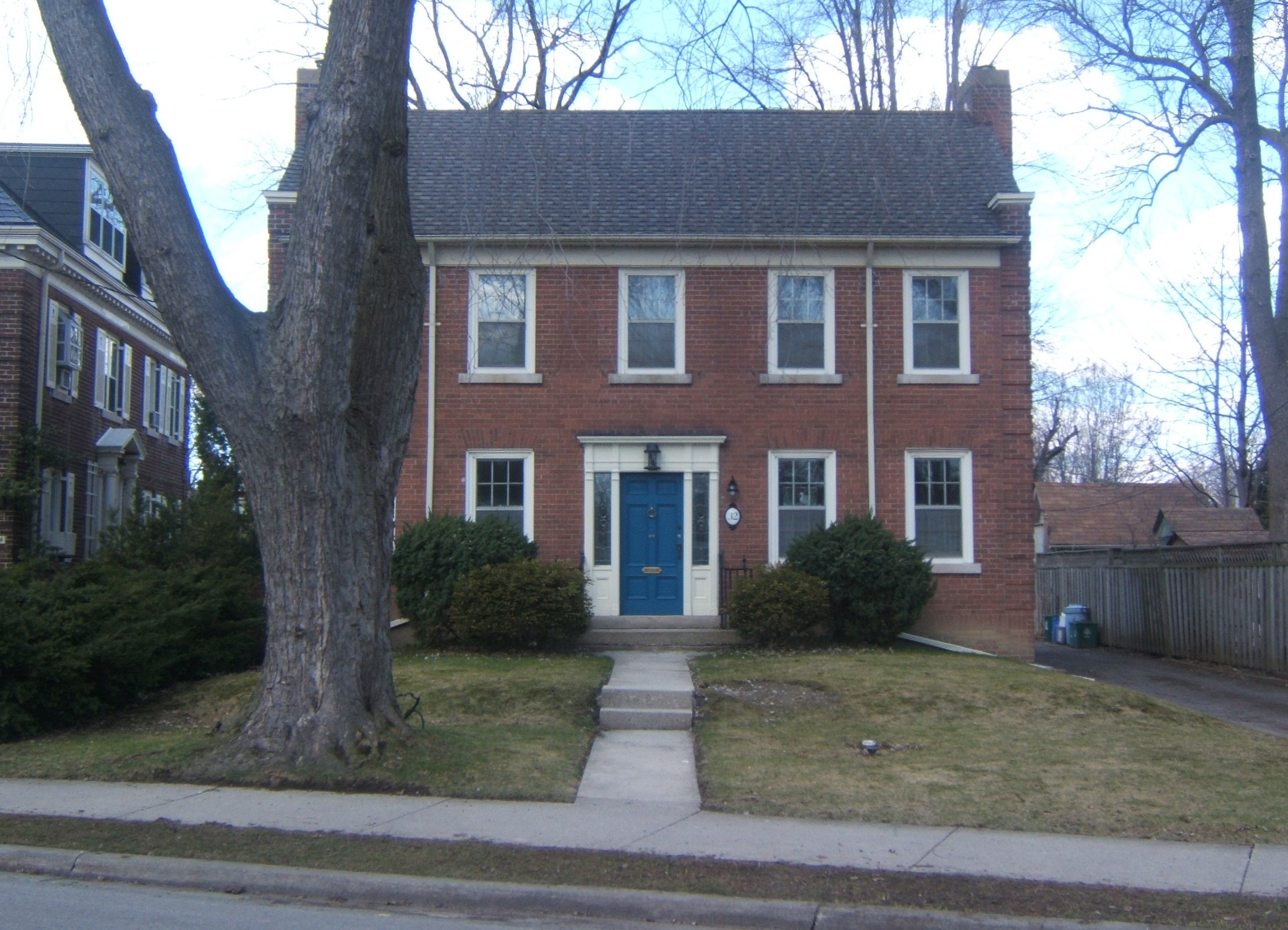
A Neo-Georgian designed home in Mimico. The Lakeshore's neighbourhoods were first to urbanize in Etobicoke.

The Lakeshore (Etobicoke—Lakeshore), along the north shore of Lake Ontario and the "Lake Shore Road" (now Lake Shore Boulevard West), comprises three former municipalities that were the first to urbanize and became separate municipalities during the first half of the 20th century: Mimico, New Toronto and Long Branch, and related communities that were never separate from the Township of Etobicoke; namely, Alderwood (originally a suburb of New Toronto), and Humber Bay (a historic gateway community connecting to Toronto) which was originally sprawl from the east side of the Humber River that was subsequently split by the construction of Ontario's first motor vehicle 'freeway' in 1938, which cuts across the top of southern Etobicoke; (the Queen Elizabeth Way).

Today, the original remnant residential (northern) section of Humber Bay is north of The Queensway, east of Mimico Creek to the Humber River. The commercial, southern section of Humber Bay retains only Christie's Biscuits bakery, as high-rise condominium towers and clustered row housing have forced out virtually all other commercial/industrial employment uses. In the late 1990s, the former McGuiness Whisky factory was converted into a high-rise loft condominium which became the centrepiece of the Mystic Pointe development. Etobicoke's first railway opened through the area in 1855, just north of the Lake Ontario shoreline, leading to the first period of growth as it replaced Dundas Street in Central Etobicoke as the main means of transportation and the industrial centre along its right-of-way.

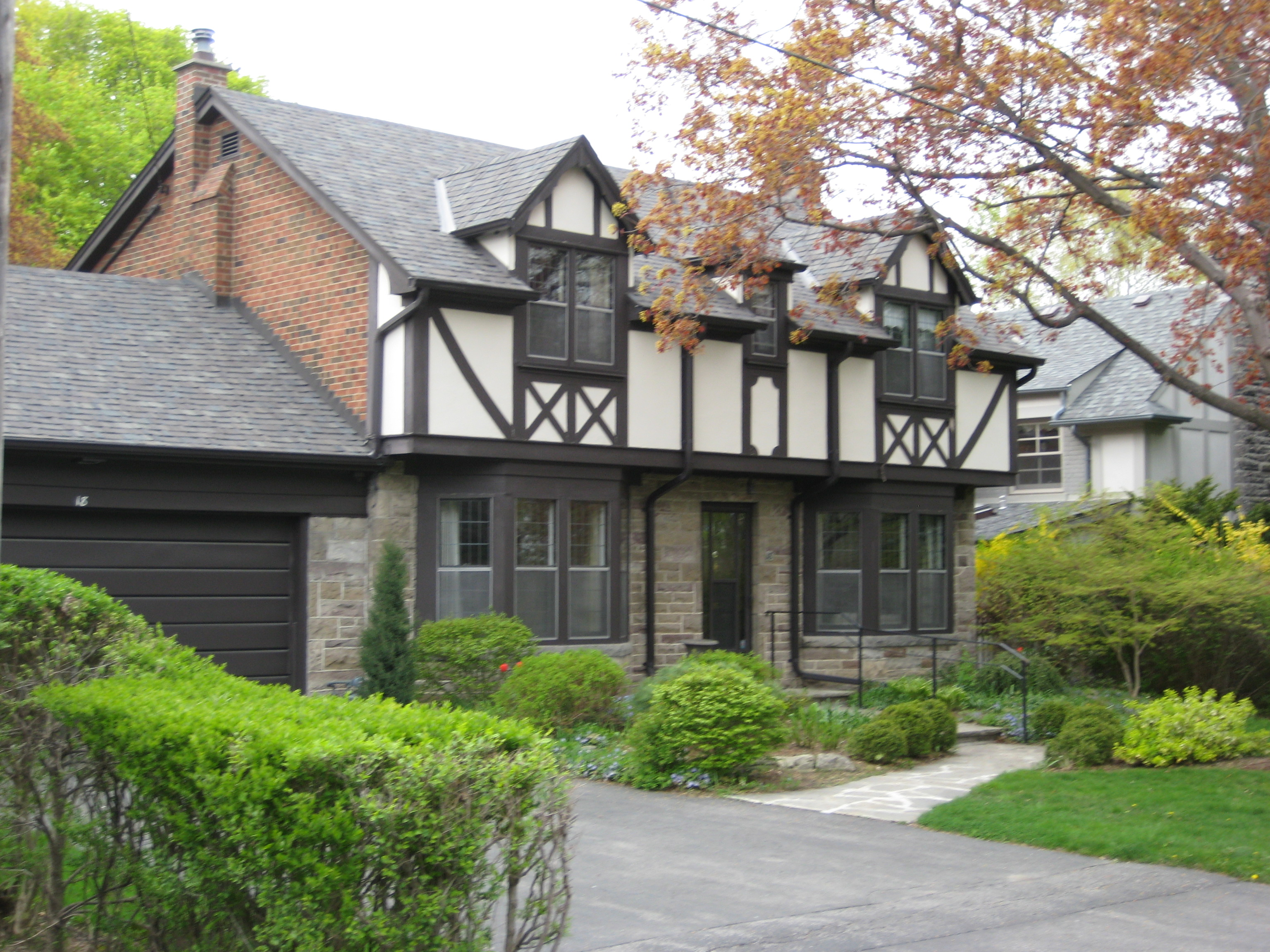
A residence in Humber Valley Village neighbourhood. Development in the Humber Valley Village began in the early 20th century.

Central Etobicoke (Etobicoke Centre); the oldest communities in Etobicoke developed along the first street, Dundas Street, in the south of this area, which crosses the width of Etobicoke on the escarpment formed by the ancient shoreline of Lake Iroquois. This area centres around the Islington community, the former administrative centre of Etobicoke and later Etobicoke's 'downtown' which is near the central 'Six Points' intersection at its western boundary. The rural Richview community developed directly to the north of Islington in the 19th century on Eglinton Ave. (formerly Richview Rd.), as did the gateway Humber Heights communities (connecting to Toronto): Westmount and Humbervale, to the east on Eglinton. Development of the until-then largely undeveloped eastern part of central Etobicoke (originally a forest reserved for the use of government mills as "The King's Mill Reserve"; "Kingsmill"), the "Humber Valley", was largely the work of Robert Home Smith starting about 1900 and including the communities of The Kingsway and Humber Valley Village. The Kingsway neighbourhood has attracted many affluent individuals and families (as of 2001, over 50% of households have an income in excess of CA$100,000/year).

As Etobicoke developed in the post-war years, low-density residential areas filled in most of the rural areas between the old communities including Thorncrest Village, Princess-Rosethorn and Eringate – Centennial – West Deane as well as the older Eatonville community to the west of Islington. Central Etobicoke includes Etobicoke's most exclusive neighbourhoods, with fine housing stock and many large treed properties. Along the East and West Mall parallel to Highway 427 exists a mix of hi-rise rentals, townhouses and post-war bungalows. Markland Wood is the farthest western community within Etobicoke/Toronto; situated along Bloor Street West, it is predominately single family housing with some mixed hi-rise rentals.

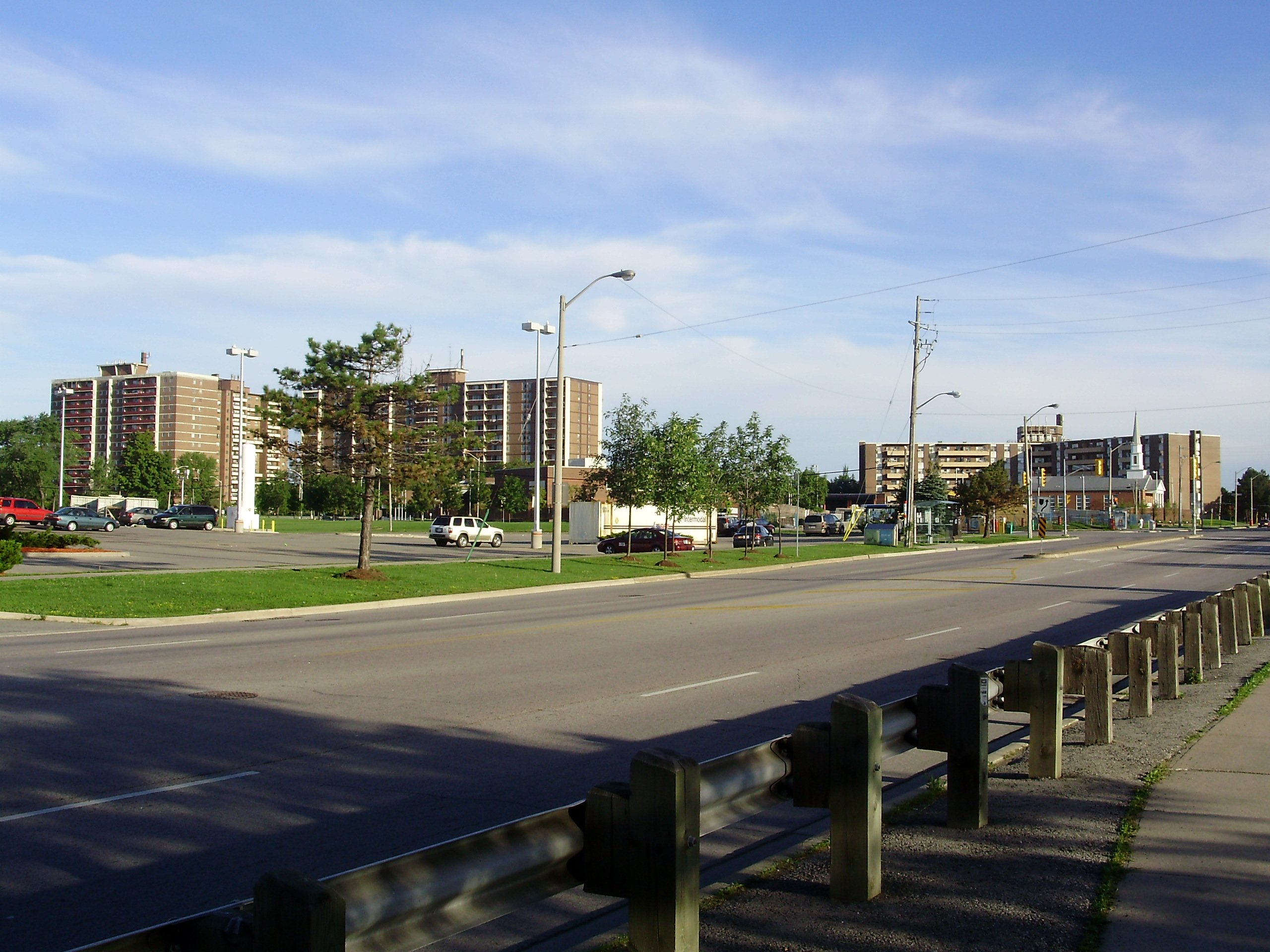
Apartment buildings in Smithfield. Most neighbourhoods in North Etobicoke were built in the years following World War II.

North Etobicoke; The 19th-century Etobicoke communities are Clairville, Highfield, Rexdale, Smithfield, Thistletown which grew along two formerly private roads (now Albion Rd. and Rexdale Blvd.) constructed diagonally across farms in Northern Etobicoke as a shortcut for travellers to Peel County (especially modern Brampton). First developed as an urban area by Rex Heslop in the post-World War II years around the new Rexdale (the Elms) community, northern Etobicoke has many apartment buildings as well as a large 'skyway' industrial park to the west, developed after Malton Airport (in nearby Mississauga) became Toronto's main "Pearson International" Airport.

== Demographics ==
Federal census population history of Etobicoke
Year	Pop.	±%
1851	3,483	—
1861	3,503	+0.6%
1871	2,985	−14.8%
1881	2,976	−0.3%
1891	4,557	+53.1%
1901	4,413	−3.2%
1911	6,193	+40.3%
1921	10,445	+68.7%
1931	13,769	+31.8%
1941	18,973	+37.8%
1951	53,779	+183.5%
1956	103,621	+92.7%
1961	156,035	+50.6%
1966	219,542	+40.7%
1971	282,686	+28.8%
1976	297,109	+5.1%
1981	298,713	+0.5%
1986	302,973	+1.4%
1991	309,993	+2.3%
1996	328,718	+6.0%
2001	338,117	+2.9%
Source: Statistics Canada

=== Language ===
As of 2016, English was the most spoken language in Etobicoke, followed by (in order) Italian, Punjabi, Spanish, Polish, Ukrainian, Gujarati, and Portuguese.

=== Ethnicity ===
Largest ethnic origin in Etobicoke by census tract based on the 2021 census

Most of Etobicoke's visible minorities and immigrants reside in North Etobicoke, with 62% of its population being foreign-born. Many people from India, Jamaica, Iraq, Guyana, Somalia, Ghana, Philippines, Nigeria, Pakistan and Bangladesh have settled in North Etobicoke. Etobicoke's central and south end has a large European population from countries such as Italy, Poland, former Yugoslavia, and Ukraine, and some of the wealthiest neighbourhoods in Toronto such as The Kingsway.

Largest panethnic group in Etobicoke by census tract based on the 2021 census

Largest panethnic group in Etobicoke by census tract based on the 2011 census

Largest panethnic group in Etobicoke by census tract based on the 2001 census

Panethnic groups in Etobicoke (1996−2021)
Panethnic group	2021 Canadian census (Note: Total of 79 census tracts from 5350200.01 through 5350250.05 in the Toronto CMA, all situated in the former Etobicoke census subdivision.)		2016 Canadian census (Note: Total of 78 census tracts from 5350200.01 through 5350250.05 in the Toronto CMA, all situated in the former Etobicoke census subdivision.)		2011 Canadian census (Note: Total of 74 census tracts from 5350200.00 through 5350250.05 in the Toronto CMA, all situated in the former Etobicoke census subdivision.)		2006 Canadian census (Note: Total of 74 census tracts from 5350200.00 through 5350250.05 in the Toronto CMA, all situated in the former Etobicoke census subdivision.)		2001 Canadian census		1996 Canadian census	
Panethnic group	Pop.	%	Pop.	%	Pop.	%	Pop.	%	Pop.	%	Pop.	%
European (Note: Statistic includes all persons that did not make up part of a visible minority or an indigenous identity.)	194,095	52.14%	202,665	56.21%	203,415	59.18%	202,435	61.15%	217,070	64.88%	225,580	69.27%
South Asian	51,150	13.74%	47,755	13.24%	46,705	13.59%	46,195	13.95%	39,170	11.71%	31,310	9.62%
African	43,920	11.8%	40,515	11.24%	35,990	10.47%	30,770	9.29%	30,770	9.2%	29,915	9.19%
Southeast Asian (Note: Statistic includes total responses of "Filipino" and "Southeast Asian" under visible minority section on census.)	19,040	5.11%	15,625	4.33%	14,535	4.23%	11,675	3.53%	9,480	2.83%	7,930	2.44%
East Asian (Note: Statistic includes total responses of "Chinese", "Korean", and "Japanese" under visible minority section on census.)	16,620	4.46%	15,990	4.43%	13,640	3.97%	14,940	4.51%	15,000	4.48%	12,265	3.77%
Latin American	15,510	4.17%	12,375	3.43%	10,215	2.97%	10,275	3.1%	7,460	2.23%	6,525	2%
Middle Eastern (Note: Statistic includes total responses of "West Asian" and "Arab" under visible minority section on census.)	12,595	3.38%	10,800	3%	8,180	2.38%	7,105	2.15%	7,385	2.21%	5,810	1.78%
Indigenous	2,675	0.72%	2,540	0.7%	1,820	0.53%	1,300	0.39%	1,210	0.36%	1,015	0.31%
Other/multiracial (Note: Statistic includes total responses of "Visible minority, n.i.e." and "Multiple visible minorities" under visible minority section on census.)	16,640	4.47%	12,295	3.41%	9,220	2.68%	6,350	1.92%	7,020	2.1%	5,275	1.62%
Total responses	372,245	98.94%	360,560	98.74%	343,720	98.78%	331,045	98.97%	334,570	98.95%	325,630	99.06%
Total population	376,237	100%	365,143	100%	347,948	100%	334,491	100%	338,117	100%	328,718	100%
Note: Totals greater than 100% due to multiple origin responses.

== Economy ==
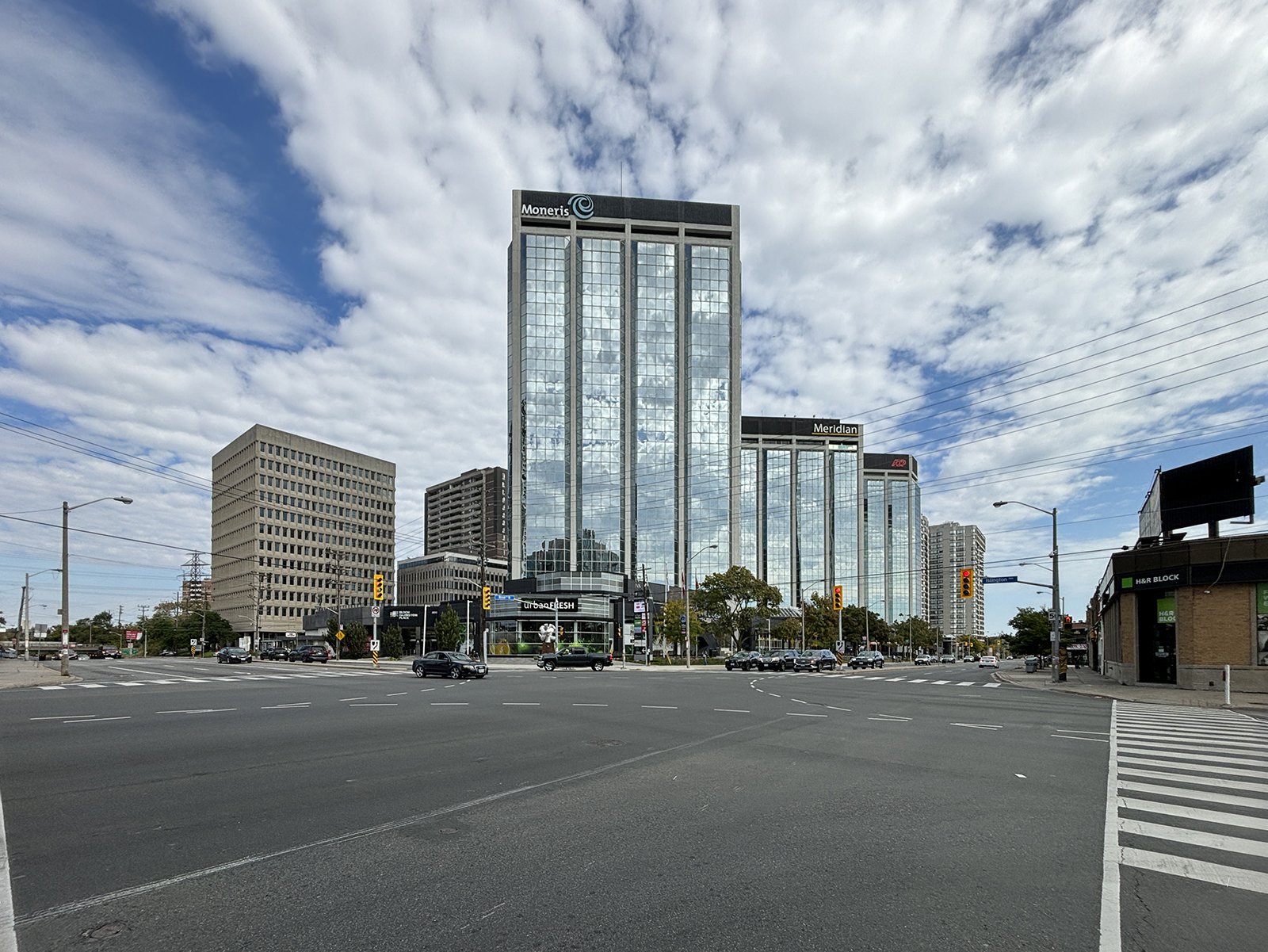
Bloor Islington Place is a commercial centre in Islington–City Centre West.

Islington–City Centre West is the central business district of Etobicoke. Pizza Pizza and Sunwing Airlines have their headquarters in Etobicoke. Skyservice and Canada 3000 had their headquarters in Etobicoke before the closure of these airlines.

The construction industry in Etobicoke has been booming, with many new condominium towers developed along the waterfront near Humber Bay and along Bloor street. This has helped increase Etobicoke's population after a brief decline. The area's film and television industry is also promising.

Etobicoke is home to a rib fest held every year on Canada Day long weekend at Centennial Park. The weekend is filled with entertainment, food, midway, and music.

== Education ==
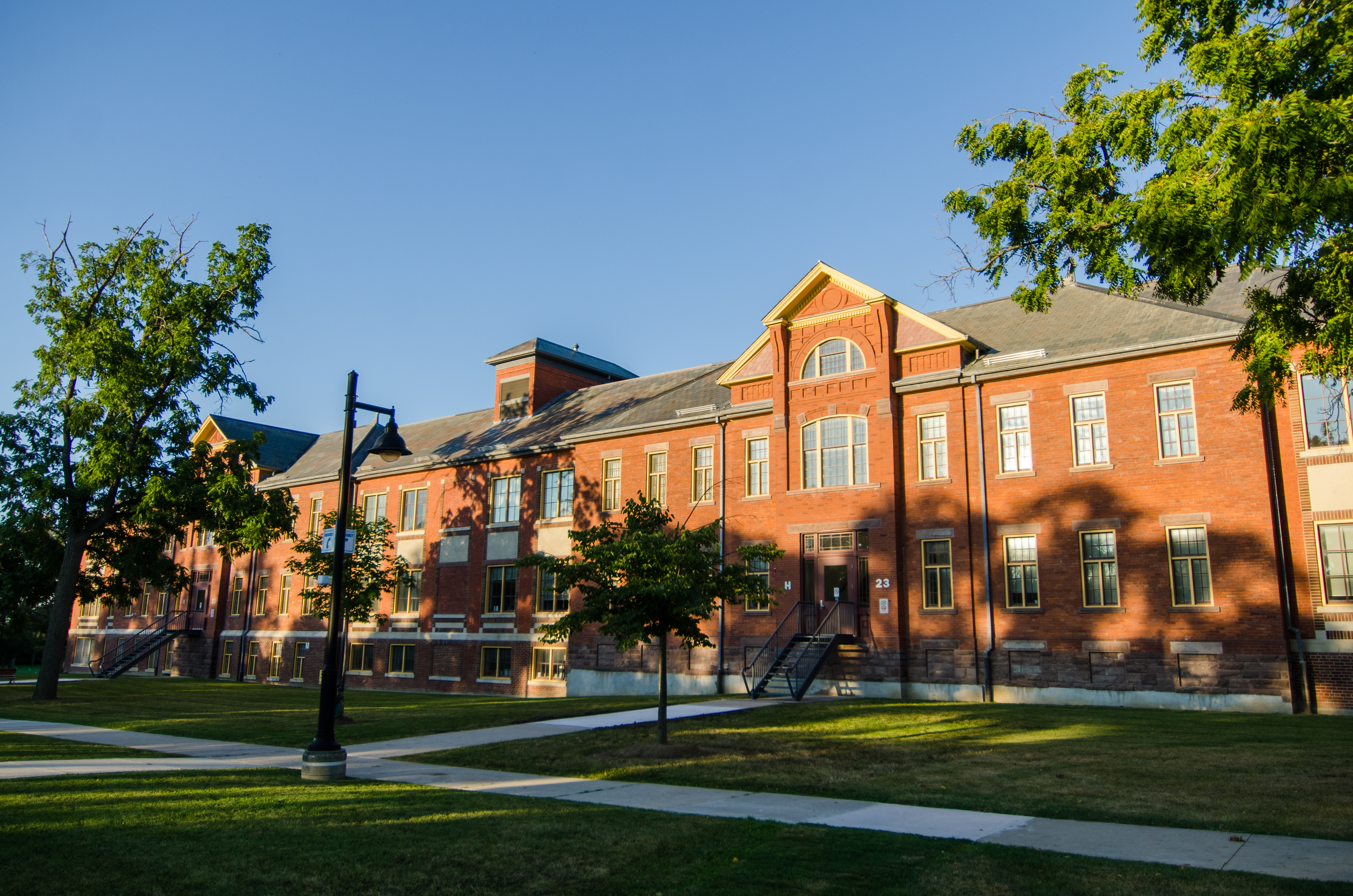
Humber Polytechnic is a public college in Etobicoke.

Four public school boards offer primary education and secondary education for residents living in Etobicoke, Conseil scolaire catholique MonAvenir (CSCM), Conseil scolaire Viamonde (CSV), the Toronto Catholic District School Board (TCDSB), and the Toronto District School Board (TDSB). CSV and TDSB operate as secular public school boards, the former operating French first language institution, whereas the latter operated English first language institutions. The other two school boards, CSCM and TCDSB, operate as public separate school boards, the former operating French first language separate schools, the latter operating English first language separate schools. Before 1998, the boards were responsible for the education in Etobicoke were the Etobicoke Board of Education for anglophone public secular schools and the Metropolitan Separate School Board for anglophone and francophone Roman Catholic separate schools.

In addition to primary and secondary schools, two post-secondary institutions are within Etobicoke. Humber Polytechnic is a public college that operates two campuses in Etobicoke, the Humber North campus, and the Lakeshore campus, on the corner of Efstathia Avenue and Kourabiedes Lane. The University of Guelph-Humber is another post-secondary institution in Etobicoke that is jointly operated by Humber Polytechnic, and the University of Guelph, based in Guelph, Ontario. Guelph-Humber is not an independent degree-granting institution, with its degrees and diplomas issued from Humber Polytechnic, or the University of Guelph.

=== History ===
In 1924, Mimico High School was opened in the village of Mimico. This was followed by Etobicoke Collegiate Institute in 1928 in central Etobicoke. Today, the Mimico school building is used by John English Junior Middle School.

Other secondary schools were built:

- Royal York Collegiate Institute (1953)
- Alderwood Collegiate Institute (1955)
- Burnhamthorpe Collegiate Institute (1956)
- Thistletown Collegiate Institute (1957)
- Richview Collegiate Institute (1958)
- Kipling Collegiate Institute (1960)
- Vincent Massey Collegiate Institute (1961)
- North Albion Collegiate Institute (1962)
- Scarlett Heights Collegiate Institute (1963)
- Silverthorn Collegiate Institute (1964)
- Martingrove Collegiate Institute (1966)
- West Humber Collegiate Institute (1966)
- Kellier Mackay Collegiate Institute (1971)
- Michael Power/St. Joseph High School (1981)
- Father John Redmond Catholic Secondary School (1986)
- Bishop Allen Academy (1989)

In the village of New Toronto, New Toronto Secondary School was constructed in 1949 and opened in 1950 as a vocational trade school. Beginning in 1963, Kingsmill Vocational School, a junior vocational school, opened at a King's Mill site and two other schools erected: Humbergrove Vocational School to the north in 1965 and Westway Vocational School in 1969.

At its peak, Etobicoke operated 14 collegiates and 4 vocational schools in 1980. Downsizing occurred in the 1980s when nine high schools were closed due to declining enrollment; Alderwood and New Toronto merged to form Lakeshore Collegiate Institute in 1983 while Humbergrove, Kingsmill and Westway were consolidated to form Central Etobicoke High School in 1988.

Etobicoke's first Roman Catholic high school, Michael Power/St. Joseph High School was first opened in 1949 as St. Joseph's High School in the village of Islington with 150 girls by the Sisters of St. Joseph. Next door, the Basilian Fathers established an all-boys school Michael Power High School in 1957. In September 1982, the two schools were merged. Today, Michael Power/St. Joseph serves many students in the southern and central Etobicoke areas predominantly populated by Polish and Ukrainian Byzantine Catholics, who attend southern Etobicoke's two other high schools: Father John Redmond Catholic Secondary School (1986) and Bishop Allen Academy (1989).

The first art school in Etobicoke is the Etobicoke School of the Arts established in 1981. Father John Redmond was designated as the Regional Arts Centre in 2006.

== Sport ==
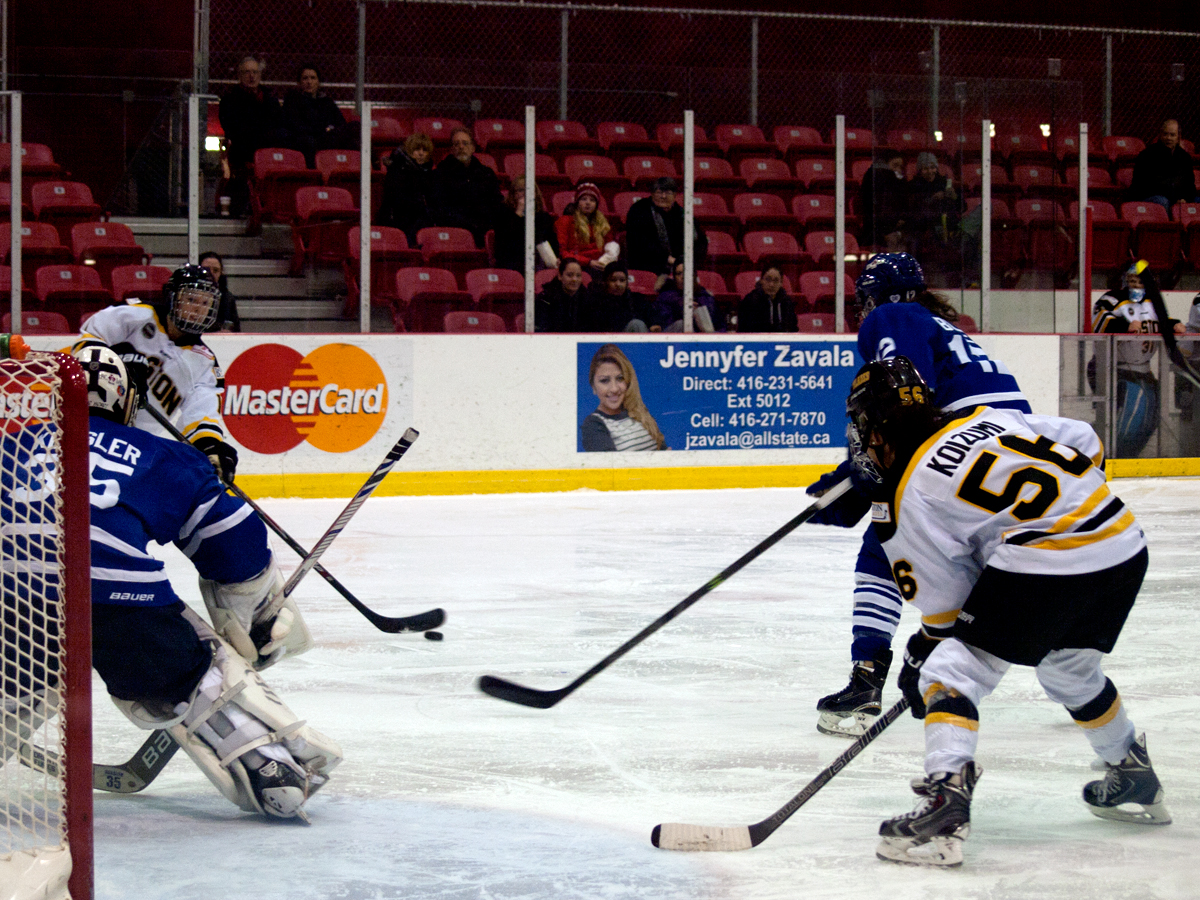
The Ford Performance Centre is an ice hockey facility in Etobicoke, that is used as the home arena for the Toronto Furies, and as the practice facilities for the Toronto Maple Leafs.

Etobicoke has a wide range of indoor and outdoor sporting leagues including baseball, soccer, gridiron football, ice hockey, and ringette. Some of the prominent clubs include the Etobicoke Kangaroos Australian rules football club, the Serbian White Eagles FC club, Toronto Croatia, and FC Ukraine United, which operate in the Canadian Soccer League, and the Toronto Furies of the Canadian Women's Hockey League.

Southern Etobicoke is home to the Ford Performance Centre, the home arena for the Toronto Furies, and the practice rink of the Toronto Maple Leafs. The Toronto Patriots of the Ontario Junior Hockey League are based in Etobicoke. Etobicoke is the hometown of Major League Baseball star Joey Votto as well as National Hockey League stars P. K. Subban, Connor Brown, brothers Brendan and Reilly Smith, and National Hockey League Hall of Famer Brendan Shanahan. Etobicoke's Centennial Park is a large green space in west Toronto which is a venue for soccer, basketball, skiing, ice hockey, rugby, hiking, track and field. Rexdale (North Etobicoke) is home to the top ranked high school basketball program in Canada, Henry Carr Crusaders. Producing notable US Division 1 and NBA players such as Tyler Ennis and Sim Bhullar. Henry Carr Crusaders were the 2016 AAA Provincial high school basketball champions.

== Transportation ==
Several major expressways, such as Ontario Highways 427, 401, 409, and 27, the Queen Elizabeth Way, as well as the city-maintained Gardiner Expressway, are routed through the area. There are numerous four- and six-lane thoroughfares in Etobicoke, laid out in a grid system. Many exceptions to Toronto's gridded street matrix are found in Etobicoke. A number of overpasses and awkward intersections have been created in an effort to reconcile the grid with these planning anomalies.

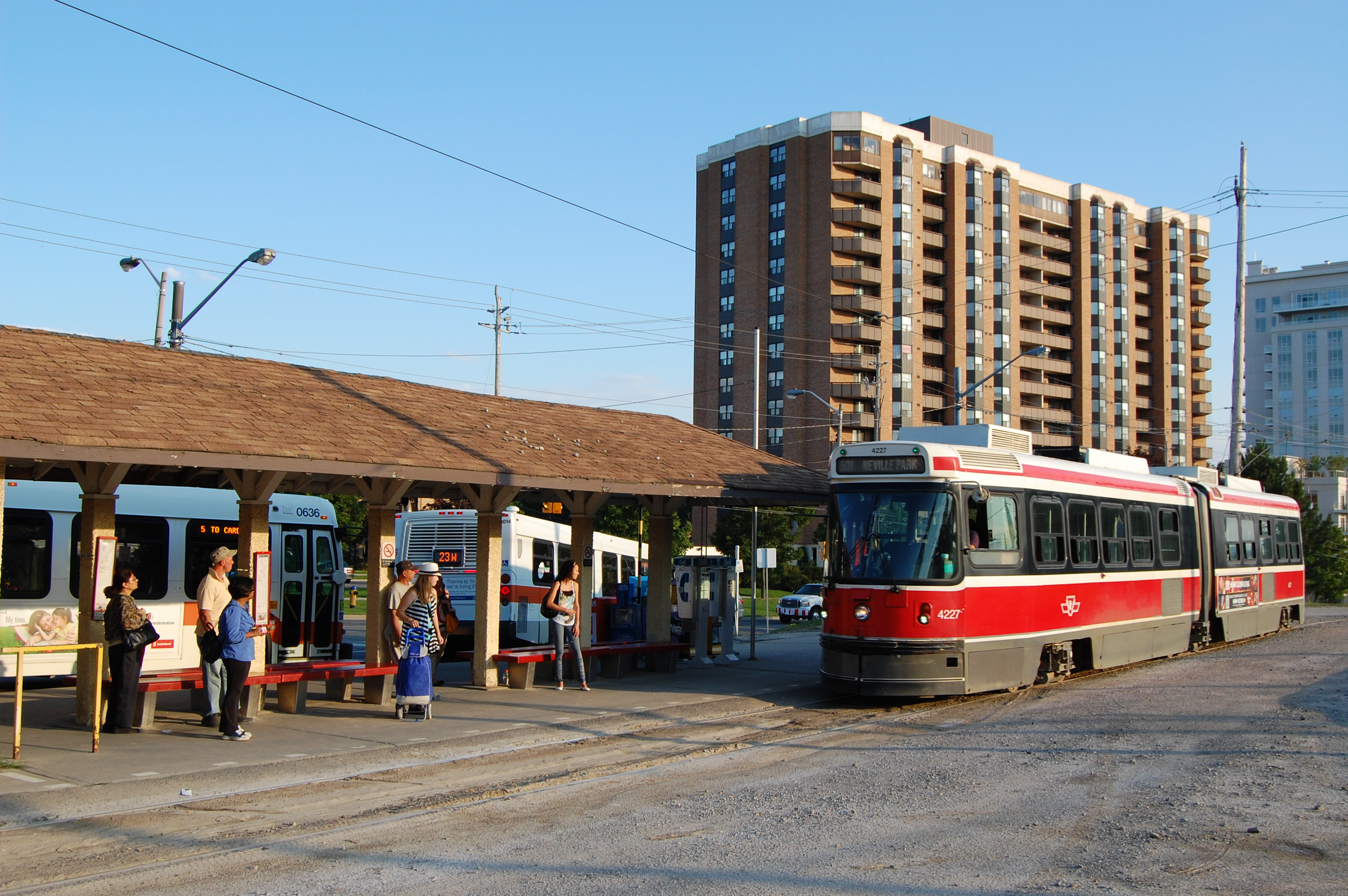
A Toronto Transit Commission streetcar at Long Branch Loop

Public transportation is primarily provided by the Toronto Transit Commission's (TTC) bus, streetcar, LRT, and subway system. Line 2 Bloor-Danforth of the TTC subway system has its western terminus at Kipling, along with three other stations. Both Kipling and Islington stations are major transit hubs, with the former serving as a terminal for MiWay bus services to Mississauga. Line 6 Finch West is entirely in Etobicoke and runs between Humber College station and Finch West station.

Former transit expansion plans in Etobicoke, including the Eglinton West subway and the extension of Line 2 from Kipling to Square One Bus Terminal in Mississauga, were cancelled by previous provincial governments. Future transit expansion plans include one light rail transit project, namely the Eglinton line extension from the future Mount Dennis station to Toronto Pearson International Airport.

Etobicoke is also home to four GO stations: Etobicoke North station on the Kitchener line, Kipling station on the Milton line, as well as Long Branch and Mimico stations on the Lakeshore West line.

== See also ==
- List of reeves and mayors of Etobicoke
- Etobicoke Board of Control
- Disappearance of Nicole Morin
- Coat of arms of Etobicoke
