= List of east–west roads in Toronto =

The following is a list of the east–west expressways and arterial thoroughfares in Toronto, Ontario, Canada. The city is organized in a grid pattern dating back to the plan laid out by Augustus Jones between 1793 and 1797. Most streets are aligned in the north–south or east–west direction, based on the shoreline of Lake Ontario. In other words, major north–south roads are generally perpendicular to the Lake Ontario shoreline and major east–west roads are generally parallel to the lake's shoreline. The Toronto road system is also influenced by its topography as some roads are aligned with the old Lake Iroquois shoreline or the deep valleys. Roads are listed south to north.

== Expressways ==
=== Gardiner Expressway ===
Gardiner Expressway
- Location: Highway 427 – Don Valley Parkway (continues west as Queen Elizabeth Way)

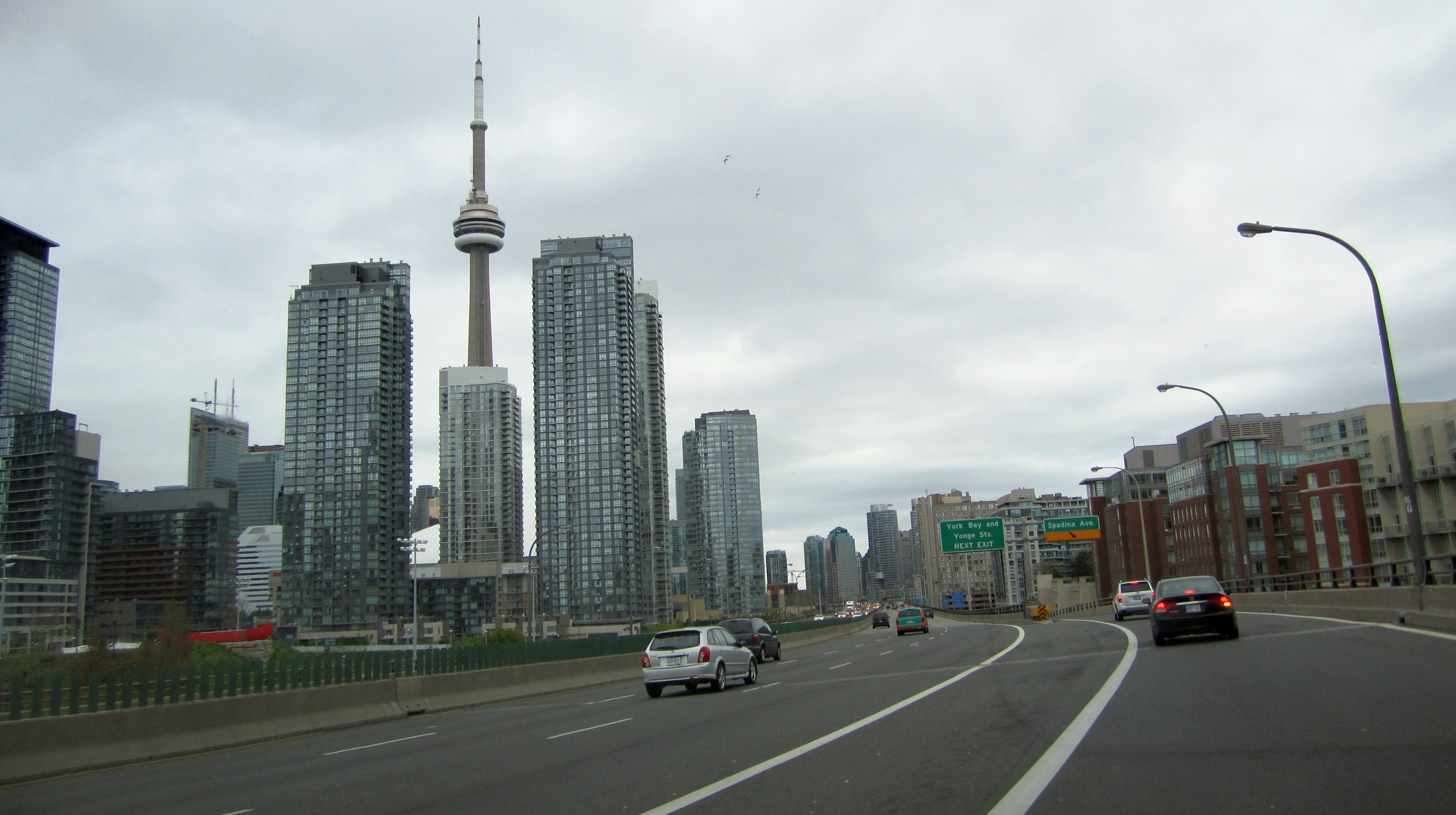
The Gardiner Expressway in downtown Toronto

The Frederick G. Gardiner Expressway, known locally as "the Gardiner", is an expressway connecting downtown with the western suburbs. Running close to the shore of Lake Ontario, it now extends from the junction of Highway 427 and the Queen Elizabeth Way (QEW) in the west to the foot of the Don Valley Parkway in the east, just past the mouth of the Don River. East of Dufferin Street, the roadway is elevated, running above Lake Shore Boulevard east of Bathurst Street, making this stretch of Gardiner Expressway unofficially the longest bridge in Ontario. Elevated sections east of the Don River were demolished and integrated into Lake Shore Boulevard.

The highway is named for the first chair of the Metropolitan Toronto Council, Frederick G. Gardiner; the council was dissolved in 1998. The six-lane section east of the Humber River was built in segments from 1955 until 1964 by the Metropolitan Toronto government with provincial highway funds. The ten-lane section west of the Humber River was formerly part of the QEW and is now wholly owned and operated by the municipal government of Toronto.

When the Gardiner was built, it passed through industrial lands, now mostly converted to residential lands. Extensive repairs became necessary in the early 1990s, and since then, the Gardiner has been the subject of several proposals to demolish it or move it underground as part of downtown waterfront revitalization efforts. One elevated section east of the Don River was demolished in 2001, and a study is underway to demolish that part of the elevated section east of Jarvis Street to the Don River.

=== Highway 401 ===
Highway 401
- Location: Renforth Road – Rouge River (continues east and west across southern Ontario)

King's Highway 401, colloquially referred to as the four-oh-one, opened between December 1947 and August 1956, and was known as the Toronto Bypass at that time. Although it has since been enveloped by suburban development, it still serves as the primary east–west through route in Toronto and the surrounding region. East of the Don Valley Parkway, it is also known as the Highway of Heroes, in reference to the funeral processions travelling between CFB Trenton and the Ontario Coroners Office in Downtown Toronto, the latter of which was moved to Hennick Humber Hospital grounds on Wilson Avenue west of Keele Street in 2013. Highway 401 crosses the entirety of Toronto and physically divides the city into a northern third and a southern two-thirds. It is also known as the Macdonald–Cartier Freeway.

Highway 401 is the busiest freeway in North America and among the widest on the continent.

=== Highway 409 ===
Highway 409
- Location: Pearson Airport to Toronto

Ontario Highway 409 or Belfield Expressway opened in 1978 to provide access to Toronto Pearson International Airport from westbound Highway 401 at Islington Avenue. The section east of Highway 427 is within Toronto, while the remaining sections west are within the City of Mississauga. The expressway is maintained by the Ministry of Transportation of Ontario and the Greater Toronto Airports Authority. The alternate name is taken from nearby Belfield Road, which begins from the westbound off-ramps for Kipling Avenue.

== Arterial roads ==
=== Queens Quay ===
Queens Quay
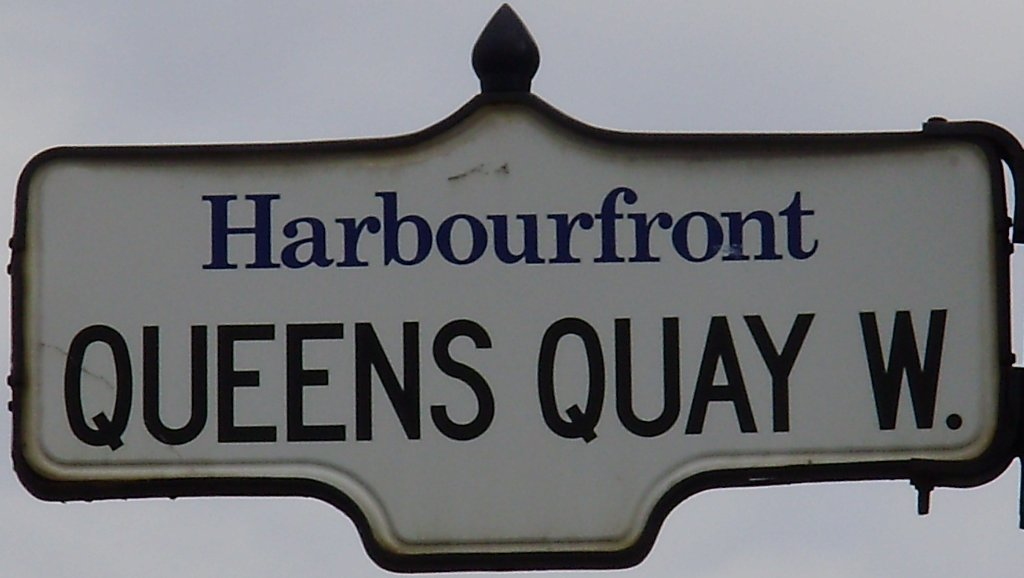
- Length: 3.6 km (2.2 mi)
- Location: Stadium Road – Lake Shore Boulevard East (continues north as Parliament Street)

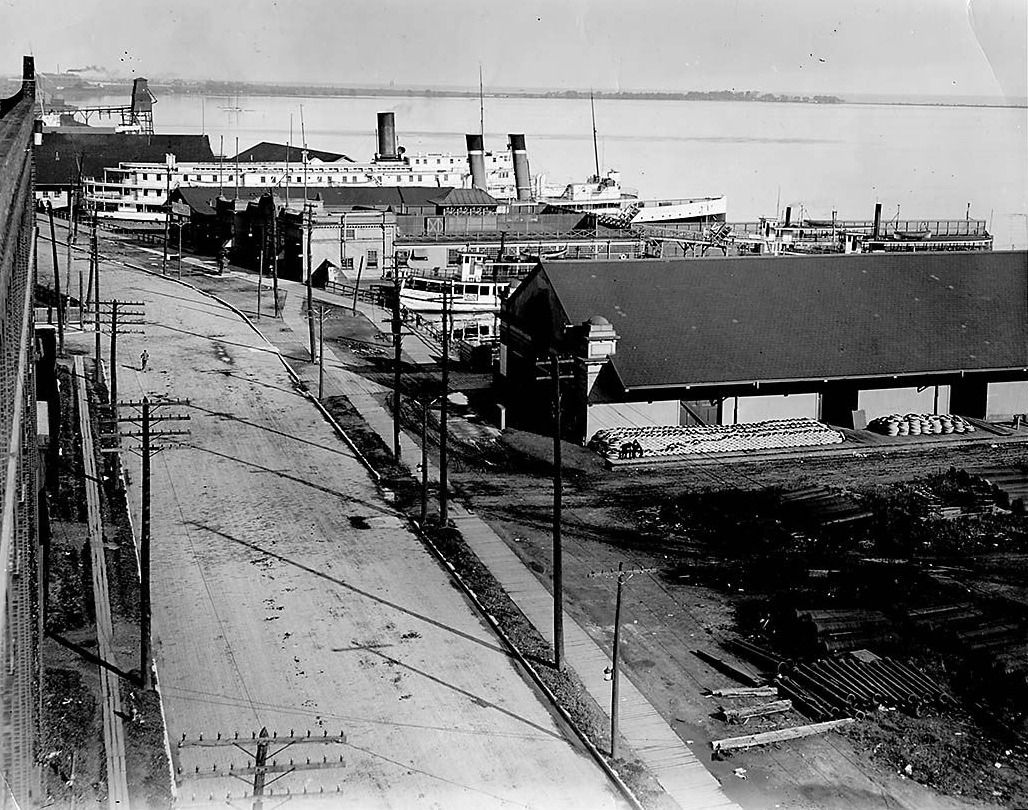
Queens Quay in 1910

Queens Quay begins west of Bathurst Street at Stadium Road and ends at Lake Shore Boulevard East, where it continues north as Parliament Street. The roadbed is built entirely on infill and is the closest road to Lake Ontario throughout the downtown core. Though once abutted by industrial and transportation uses from end to end, much of its length is now lined with recreational and residential uses. The 509 Harbourfront streetcar line now travels in a dedicated streetcar right-of-way in the median from Bay Street to Bathurst Street. The length east of Yonge Street retains some industrial uses, although this is changing with the development of residential and commercial uses.

In 2015, Waterfront Toronto announced its plans to turn Queens Quay into a grand lakefront boulevard by placing streetcar lanes in the centre, traffic only on the north side and a bicycle and pedestrian focused space on the south side. The plan reduces the number of traffic lanes on Queens Quay to two, to the north side of the streetcar tracks. Additionally, the plan calls for the beautification and extension of the Harbourfront streetcar line along Queens Quay East between Yonge and Cherry streets. The newly modified Queens Quay was completed in 2015 from Bathurst Street to Bay Street.

=== Lake Shore Boulevard ===
Lake Shore Boulevard
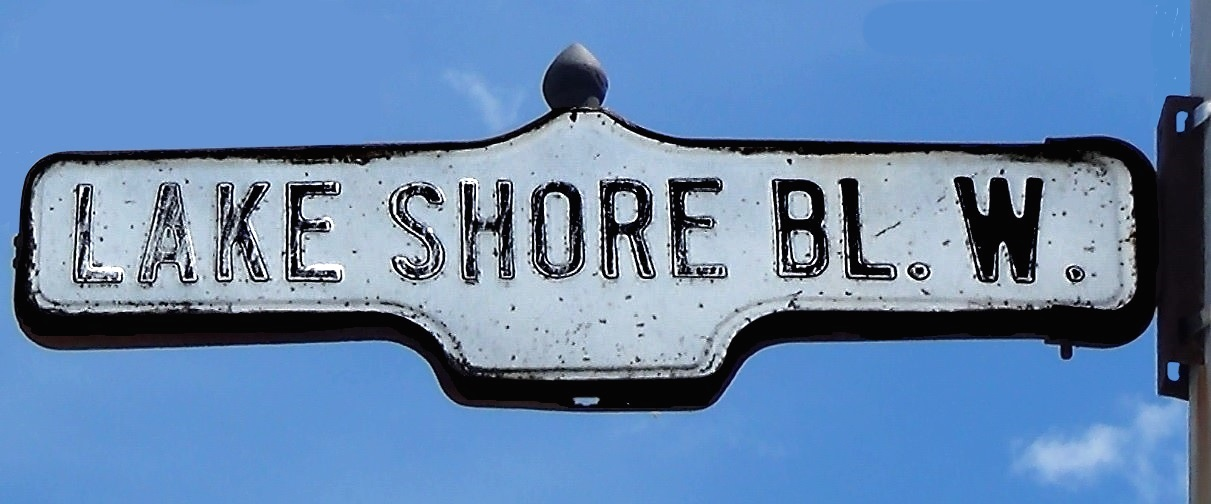
- Location: Etobicoke Creek – Ashbridge's Bay (continues north as Woodbine Avenue)

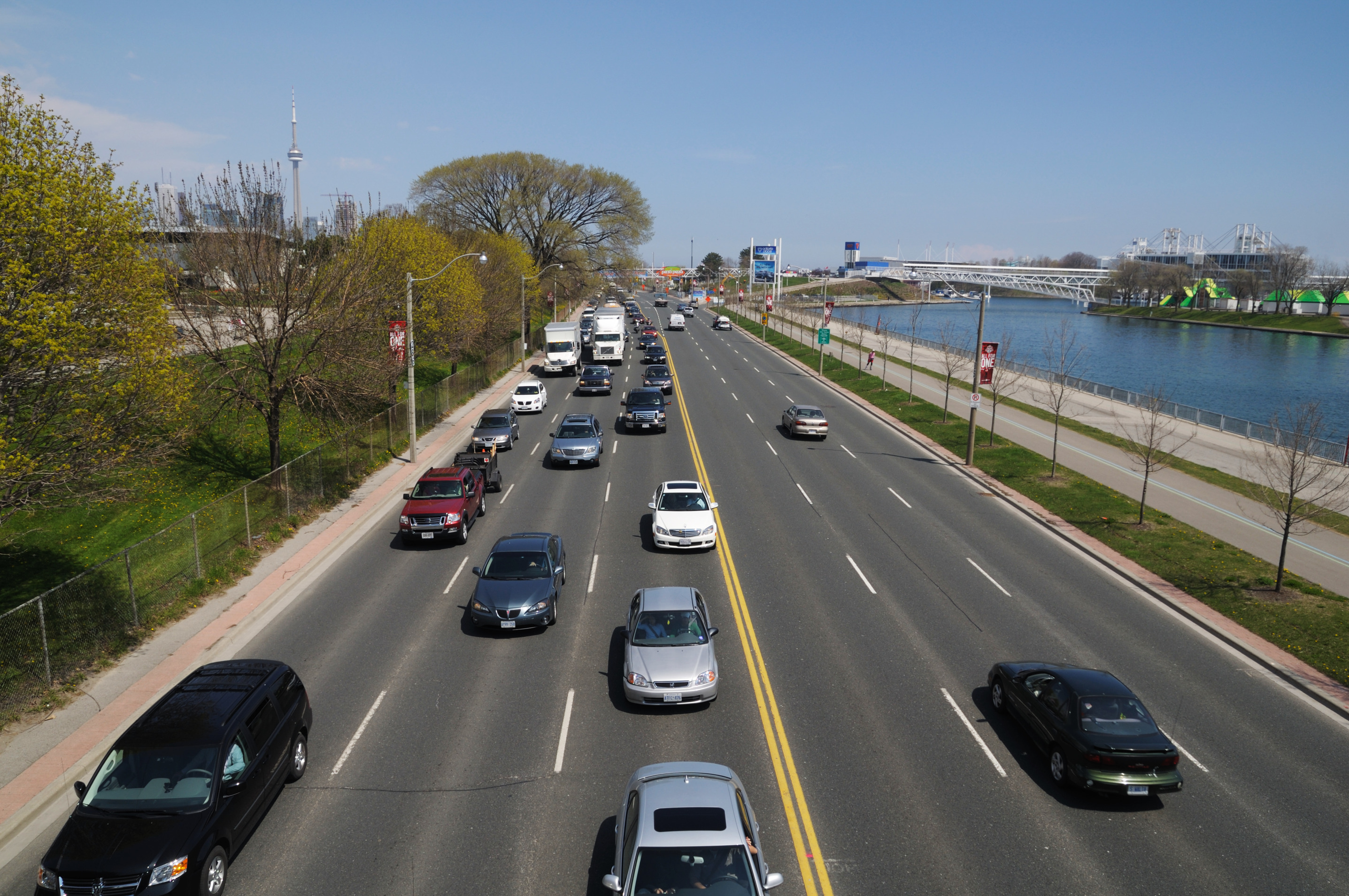
Looking east on Lake Shore Boulevard from Exhibition Place

Lake Shore Boulevard, often incorrectly compounded to Lakeshore Boulevard, is so named because of its course along the Lake Ontario shoreline. Although the road west of Roncesvalles Avenue (which was the eastern terminus of the original Lake Shore Road, which continued as Queen Street) has existed since the 19th century, much of the remainder of the route was created between the 1920s and 1950s. Lake Shore Boulevard east of the Humber River was doubled in width by widening into the right of way of Lake Shore Road, replacing it, which resulted in the demolition of the rail overpass leading to the Queen/Roncesvalles intersection by 1960. Incorporating various streets (that mostly formed the original route of former Highway 2) such as Laburnam Avenue, Starr Avenue and Dominion Street, the route was pushed east to Bathurst Street on January 28, 1924. From there, it continued as Fleet Street to Cherry Street, incorporating a segment of the latter. Keating Street continued east from a point just south of that intersection to Leslie Street, and a new extension was built to turn north to tie into a short southerly extension of Woodbine Avenue. These three streets were reconstructed to form a continuous roadway, and renamed as part of Lake Shore Boulevard on August 25, 1959.

West of downtown, Lake Shore Boulevard is served by TTC streetcar routes 501 Queen and 508 Lake Shore.

=== Mill Street ===
Mill Street runs from Parliament Street to Bayview Avenue. Now associated with the heritage Distillery District, Corktown, Toronto and Mill Street Brewery, the road was named in reference to the Toronto Rolling Mills, a rail-making plant founded by Sir Casimir Gzowski in 1857 that was once located at Rolling Mills Road (once called East Street and later Water Street) until 1874 and torn down for use as Grand Trunk Railway railyard (now used by GO Transit). Mill Street Brewery, owned by InBev, is named after this street and continues to maintain a brewery and restaurant on that street in the Distillery District.

=== Front Street ===
Front Street
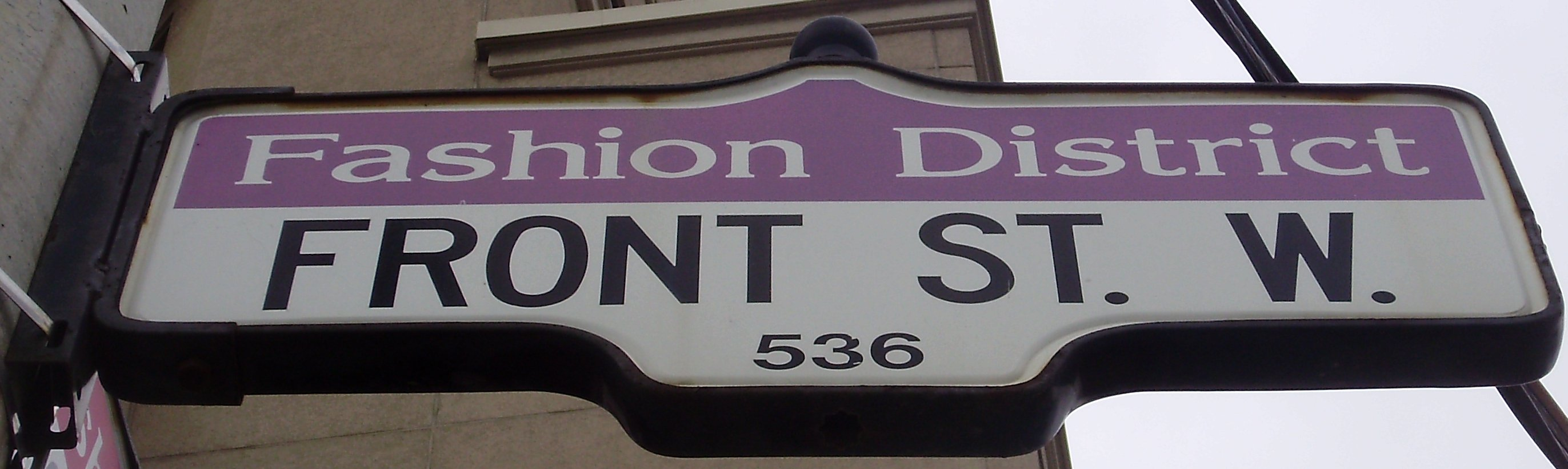
- Length: 3.8 km (2.4 mi)
- Location: Bathurst Street – Bayview Avenue

Front Street is so named because it fronted the Lake Ontario shoreline at the time of the original layout of York. The early street was called Palace Street. In the early years of the 20th century, the Toronto Harbour Commission revitalized the stagnant industrial waterfront. Largely as a result of this process, the shoreline was filled several hundred metres south to Queens Quay.

Front Street begins at Bathurst Street and crosses through downtown Toronto north of the rail viaduct. The road passes the Metro Toronto Convention Centre, the CN Tower and Union Station before eventually merging with Eastern Avenue. A short side street section branches off at the diversion and continues east to Bayview Avenue.

=== Wellington Street ===
Wellington Street
- Length: 3.3 km (2.1 mi)
- Location: Strachan Avenue – east of Church Street

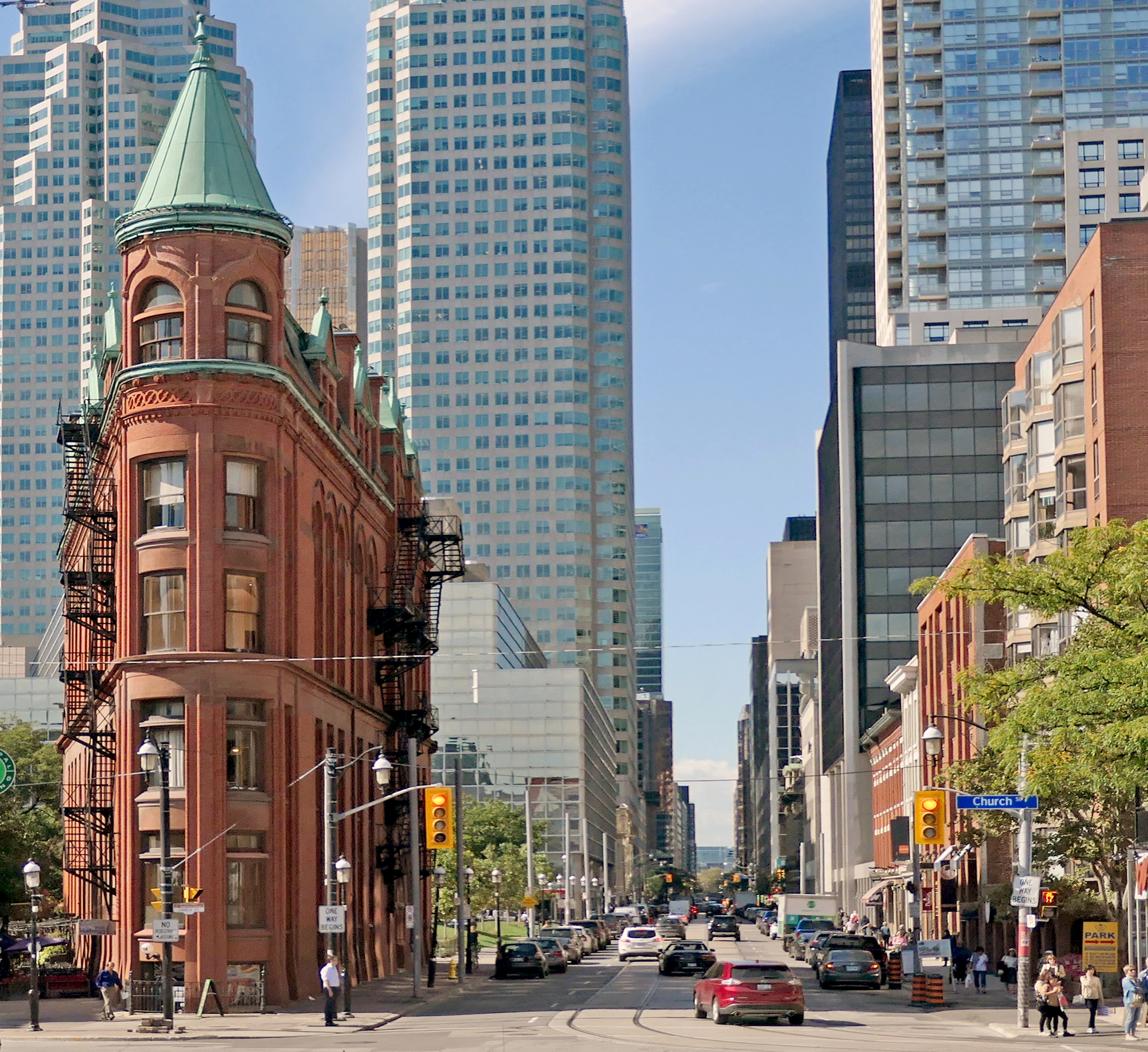
Wellington Street with the historic Gooderham Building on the left

Wellington Street is a one-way westbound street north of Front Street. Wellington Street begins at Church Street and cuts through downtown Toronto, passing through the Financial District and ends at Strachan Avenue, then continues as Douro Street (once the name for the section from Bathurst Street to Strachan Avenue) until King Street West. Wellington Street is cut off at Clarence Square and vehicles cannot connect with east or west of Spadina Avenue. Wellington Street is likely named after Arthur Wellesley, 1st Duke of Wellington. In maps in the early years of York, the street was called Market Street in reference to the street to the south of Market Square.

The street passes by a number of small urban parkettes:

- Berczy Park (named after William Berczy)
- Pecaut Square – formerly Metro Square and named after David Pecaut
- Clarence Square
- Victoria Memorial Square

The 503 Kingston Rd streetcar route runs on a single track between Church Street and York Street.

=== Eastern Avenue ===
Eastern Avenue
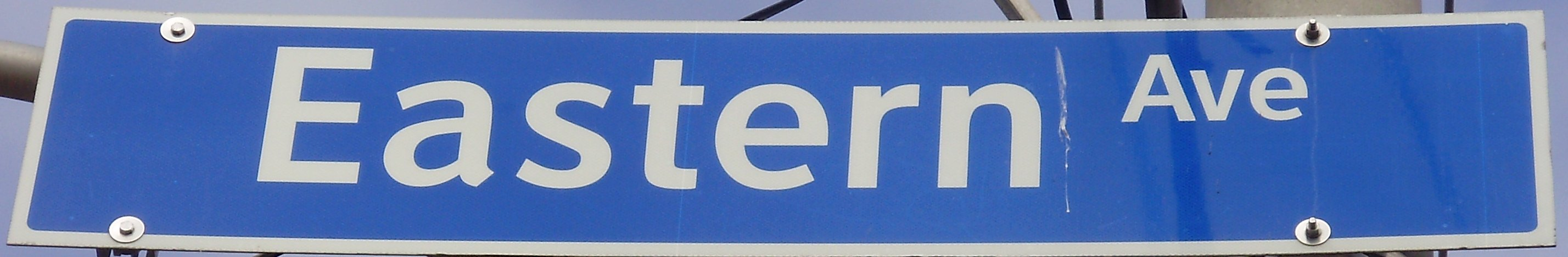
- Location: Trinity Street – Queen Street (continues west as Front Street east as Kingston Road)

Eastern Avenue, formerly South Park Street, was named on November 27, 1876. It was connected with Kingston Road in 1998 following the removal of the old Woodbine Racetrack. Eastern Avenue begins at a curve along Front Street east of Parliament Street; eastbound traffic on Front is defaulted onto Eastern Avenue, vice versa for westbound traffic on Eastern. The road crosses the Don River, merging with Richmond Street and Adelaide Street and providing access to the Don Valley Parkway. East of Broadview Avenue, it travels parallel to and three blocks south of Queen Street East along the King Street alignment to east of Coxwell Avenue, where it curves northward and meets Queen Street. North of Queen Street, the road becomes Kingston Road.

=== King Street ===
King Street
- Location: Roncesvalles Avenue – Don River (continues west as The Queensway east as Queen Street East)

King Street was named in honour of King George III by John Graves Simcoe when it was laid out in the original plan of York in 1793. It has had various names over the years. The street travels east from the Queensway, splitting off to the southeast at Queen Street West and Roncesvalles Avenue, to the Don River where it ends at Queen Street East. The central section of King Street has a transit mall named King Street Transit Priority Corridor to accommodate streetcar routes along King Street.

=== Adelaide Street ===
Adelaide Street
- Location: Shaw Street – Don River (begins from Eastern Avenue)

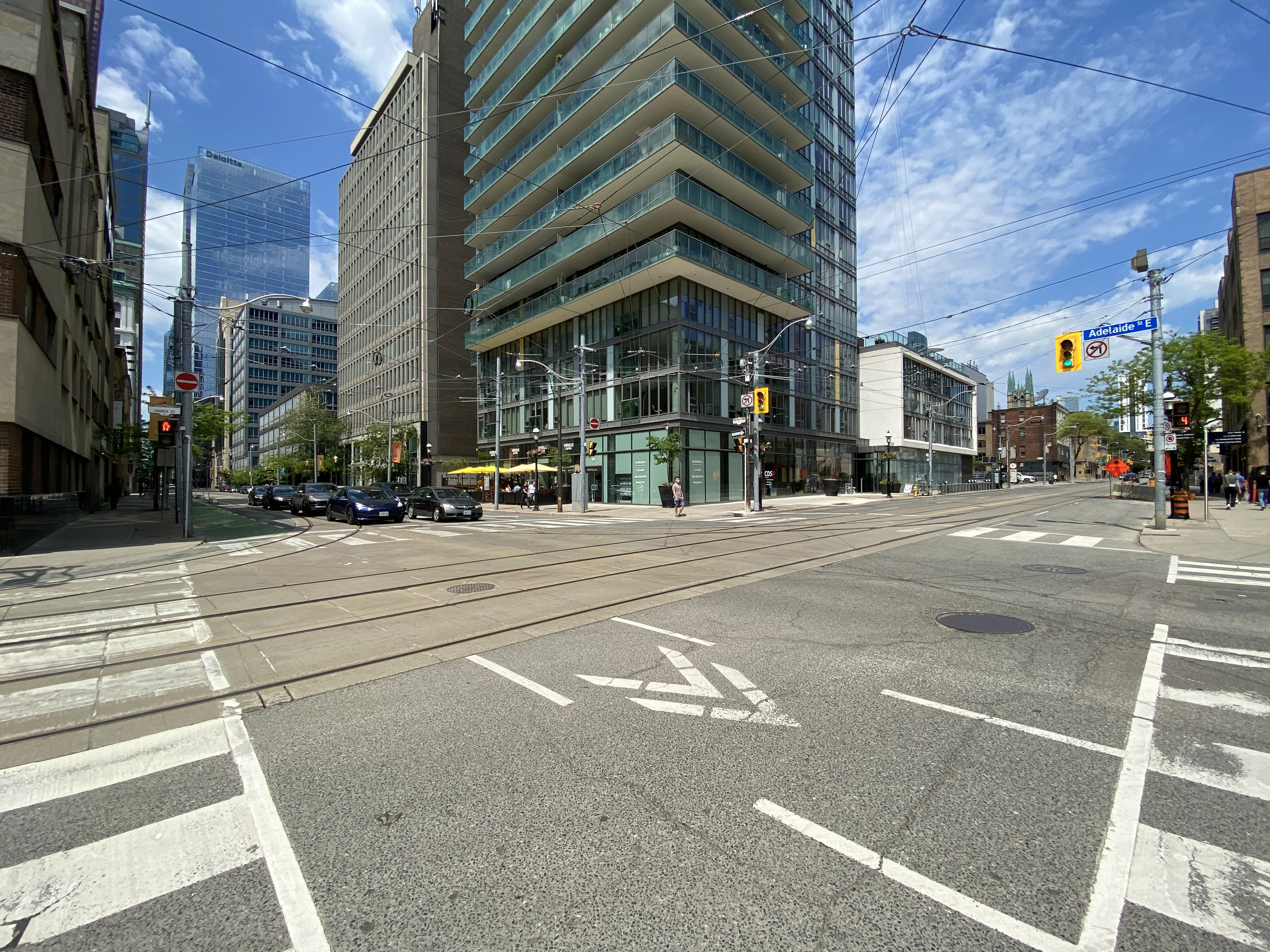
Adelaide Street at Church Street, Toronto

Adelaide Street was named after Princess Adelaide of Saxe-Meiningen (wife of King William IV) by Peter Russell, second Lieutenant Governor of Upper Canada, in his 1797 plan of Toronto. The original section of Adelaide Street was only a portion of the present street. In 1844, Little Adelaide Street, Adelaide Street and Newgate Street were amalgamated to form Adelaide Street from Jarvis to Bathurst Street. The street was split into east and west sections in 1884. In 1926, at the request of property owners, Adelaide Street West was extended from Bathurst Street to Shaw Street, incorporating the entirety of Defoe Street and McDonnell Square.

The most recent extension came in 1965, when Adelaide Street East was routed eastward onto Duke Street, which crossed between Jarvis Street and Parliament Street. This was done in advance of the opening of the lower section of the Don Valley Parkway and the eastern section of the Gardiner Expressway. Newgate and Duke Streets were amalgamated into Adelaide Street East and a connecting road was built from Parliament to the Parkway at Eastern Avenue where an on-ramp connects to the northbound Parkway. At the same time, the newly-extended Adelaide was converted to a one-way street in the easterly direction. Between the Eastern Avenue ramp and Bathurst, Adelaide serves as the eastbound member of a one-way pair, together with Richmond Street as the westbound member.

=== Richmond Street ===
Richmond Street
- Location: Strachan Avenue – Don River (continues east as Eastern Avenue)

Richmond Street is named after Charles Lennox, 4th Duke of Richmond. Lennox came to Canada in 1818 as Governor-in-Chief of British North America, and died a year later after being bitten by a rabid fox while touring the countryside. Richmond Street absorbed Duchess Street east of Jarvis and became a one-way road in 1958 as part of a process to build ramps to Eastern Avenue and the Don Valley Parkway. Richmond Street is a westbound one-way street from Yonge Street to Strachan Avenue, and it is one-way eastbound from Niagara Street to Bathurst Street. It is serving as the westbound member of a one-way pair, together with Adelaide Street as its eastbound counterpart. Between its western terminus at Strachan Avenue and Bathurst Street, the street is one-way, alternating directions twice. The street from east of Yonge Street to York Street was once called Hospital Street after the original location of Toronto General Hospital.

=== The Queensway ===
The Queensway
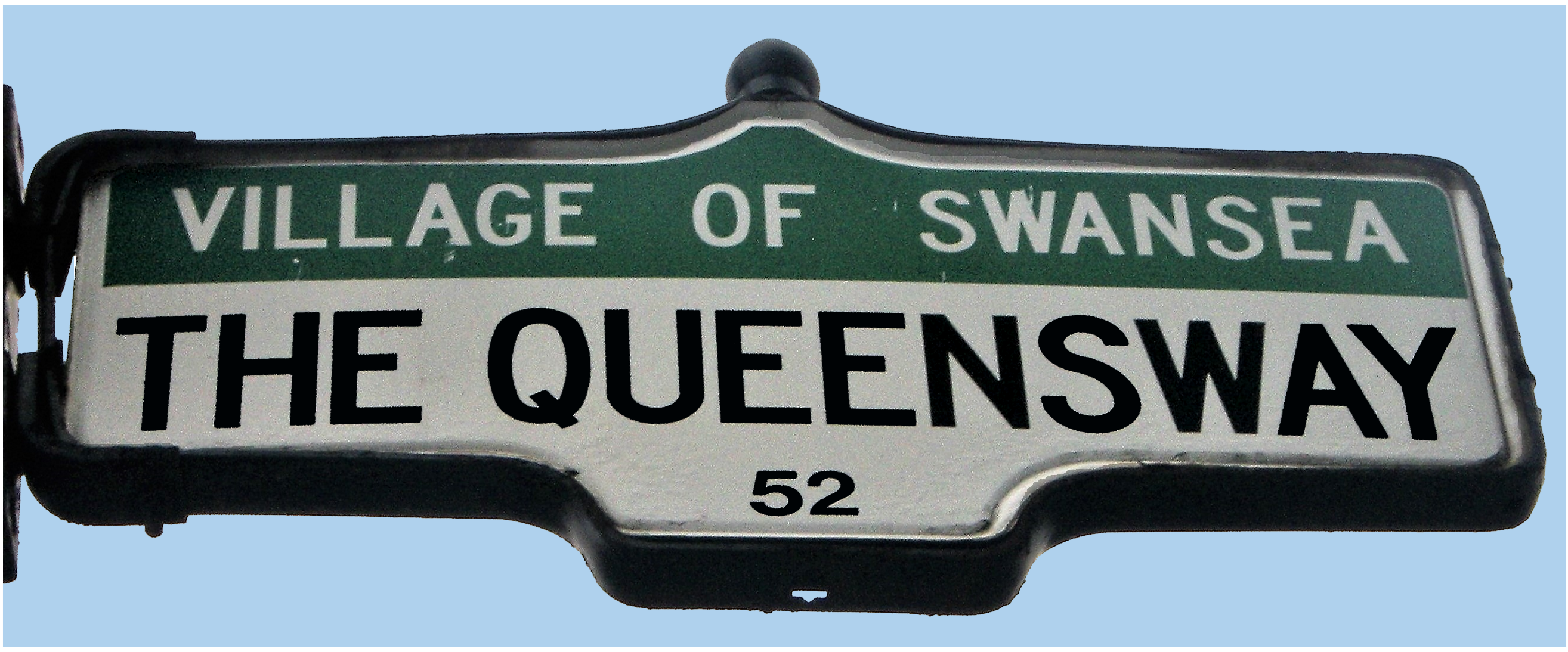
- Location: Etobicoke Creek – Roncesvalles Avenue (continues east as Queen Street west into Mississauga)

The Queensway was constructed in the 1950s, connecting Queen Street at Roncesvalles to Queen Street west of the Humber River. The section west of the Humber was renamed as such, rather than using Queen Street, because the Borough of Etobicoke desired a counterpart to The Kingsway. At the same time as Metro Toronto was building the Gardiner Expressway, it constructed the section of The Queensway from Roncesvalles westward through High Park to the Humber River, incorporating a separated street-car right-of-way in the middle. This replaced the section of Lakeshore Road that extended from Roncesvalles.

=== Queen Street ===
Queen Street
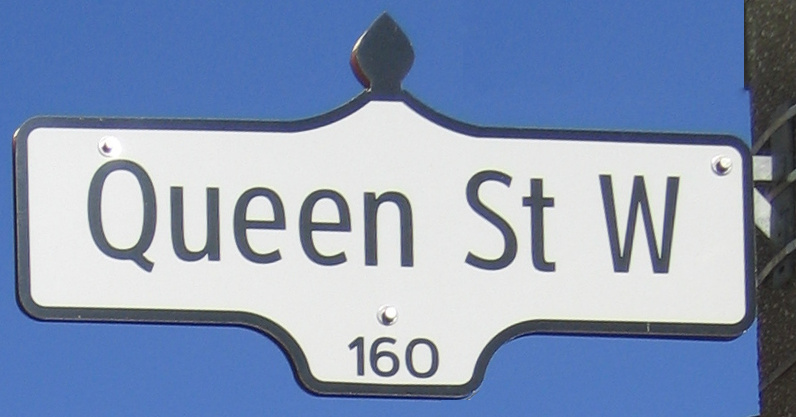
- Location: Roncesvalles Avenue – Fallingbrook Road (continues west as The Queensway)

Queen Street, known as Lot Street until 1844, was named in honour of Queen Victoria, who reigned from 1837 until her death in 1901. For a time, Lot Street served as the northern limit of York. On the north side of the street, large 80-hectare (200-acre) park lots were granted to loyalists and government officials, many of whom never visited Upper Canada during their lives. The central portion of Lot Street was constructed as the baseline for surveys along Yonge Street by the Queen's Rangers in 1793 as the first concession road. It was later extended west to Ossington Avenue as part of the Governor's Road (Dundas Street).

Queen Street begins at an intersection with the Queensway, Roncesvalles Avenue and King Street and crosses through Parkdale, the Fashion District, downtown Toronto, Riverdale, Leslieville, East Toronto and The Beaches, ending east of Victoria Park Avenue at a residential street named Fallingbrook Road in Scarborough. Aside from the easternmost three blocks from Neville Park Boulevard to Fallingbrook Road, the entirety of the street is served by the 501 Queen streetcar route.

=== Dundas Street ===
Dundas Street
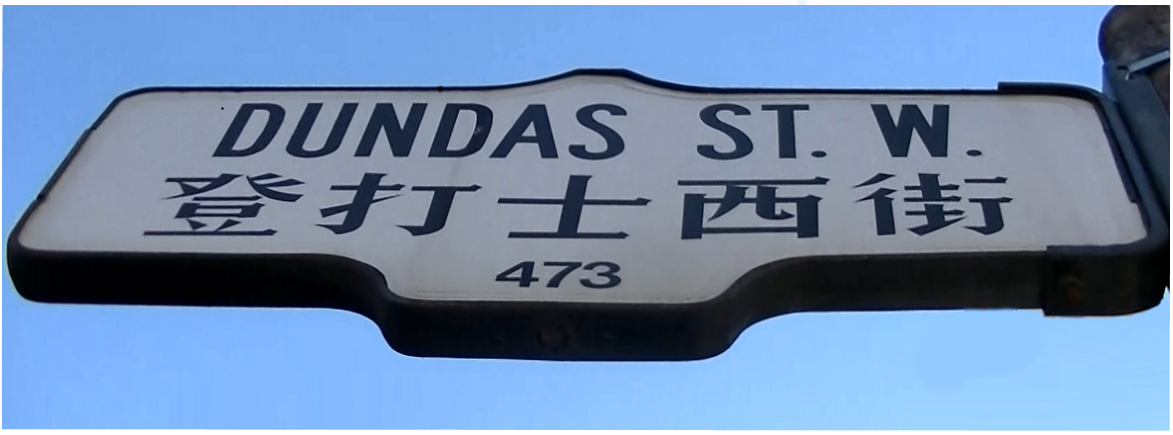
- Location: Etobicoke Creek – Kingston Road (continues west into Mississauga)

Dundas Street was named by John Graves Simcoe in honour of the Right Honourable Henry Dundas, 1st Viscount Melville. Like Yonge Street, named in a similar example of cronyism, Dundas Street was created as a defensive road. Simcoe feared the impending invasion of the Americans following the Revolutionary War, an event that would occur in 1812. Dundas Street was to connect York with Detroit, then a British settlement; it reached as far as London, Simcoe's proposed new capital. The street was constructed by the Queen's Rangers between Dundas and the Thames River in 1794, and later extended east to York by pioneer road builder Asa Danforth in 1797.

Dundas Street used to begin at the present-day intersection of Queen Street West and Ossington Avenue. It travelled north along Ossington Avenue, then turned west at Garrison Creek along the current Dundas Street. By the 1920s, Dundas Street was extended east through downtown Toronto to Broadview Avenue along several existing but discontinuous streets, comprising Arthur Street (Ossington Avenue to Bathurst Street), St. Patrick Street (Bathurst Street to McCaul Street), Anderson Street (McCaul Street to University Avenue), Agnes (University Avenue to Yonge Street), Crookshank (Yonge Street to Victoria Street, now separated and known as Dundas Square, though the public square itself is named Sankofa Square) and Wilton Avenue (Victoria Street to Broadview Avenue). This was done by correcting several irregularities, or "jogs", between the streets. These jogs are evident east of Bathurst Street and east of Yonge Street.

Amid the protests following the murder of George Floyd in Minneapolis in 2020, over 10,000 people have signed a petition calling the city to rename Dundas Street "due to its namesake's involvement in supporting the gradual abolition of slavery in the British Empire in the 18th century" as opposed to immediate abolition. Dundas station has been renamed TMU station as a result.

=== Gerrard Street ===
Gerrard Street
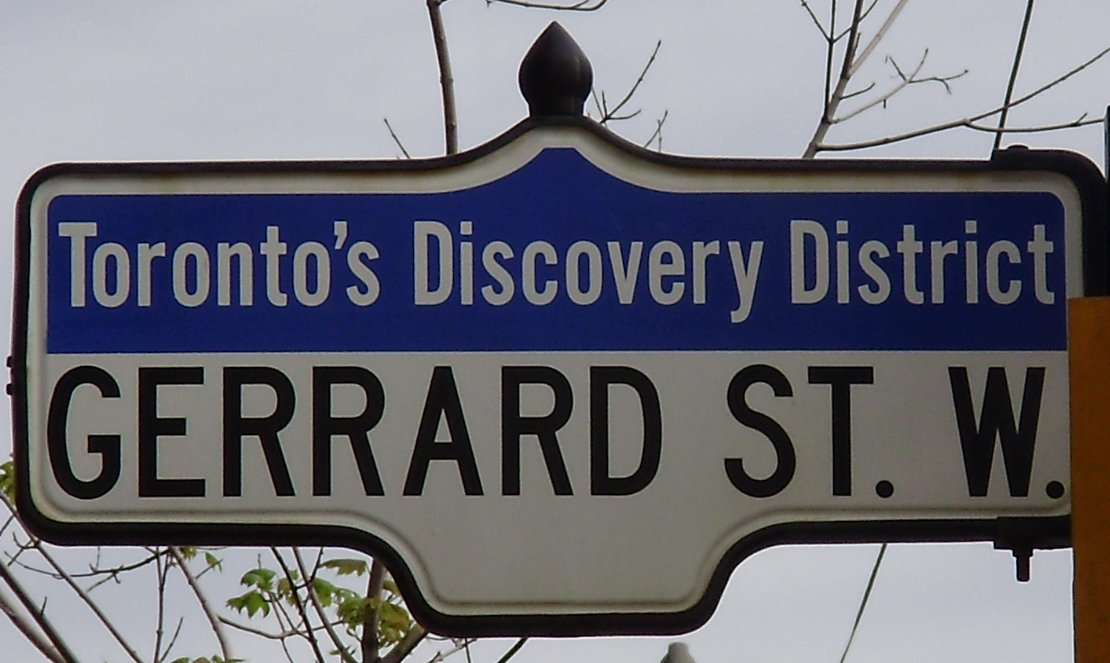
- Location: University Avenue – Clonmore Drive

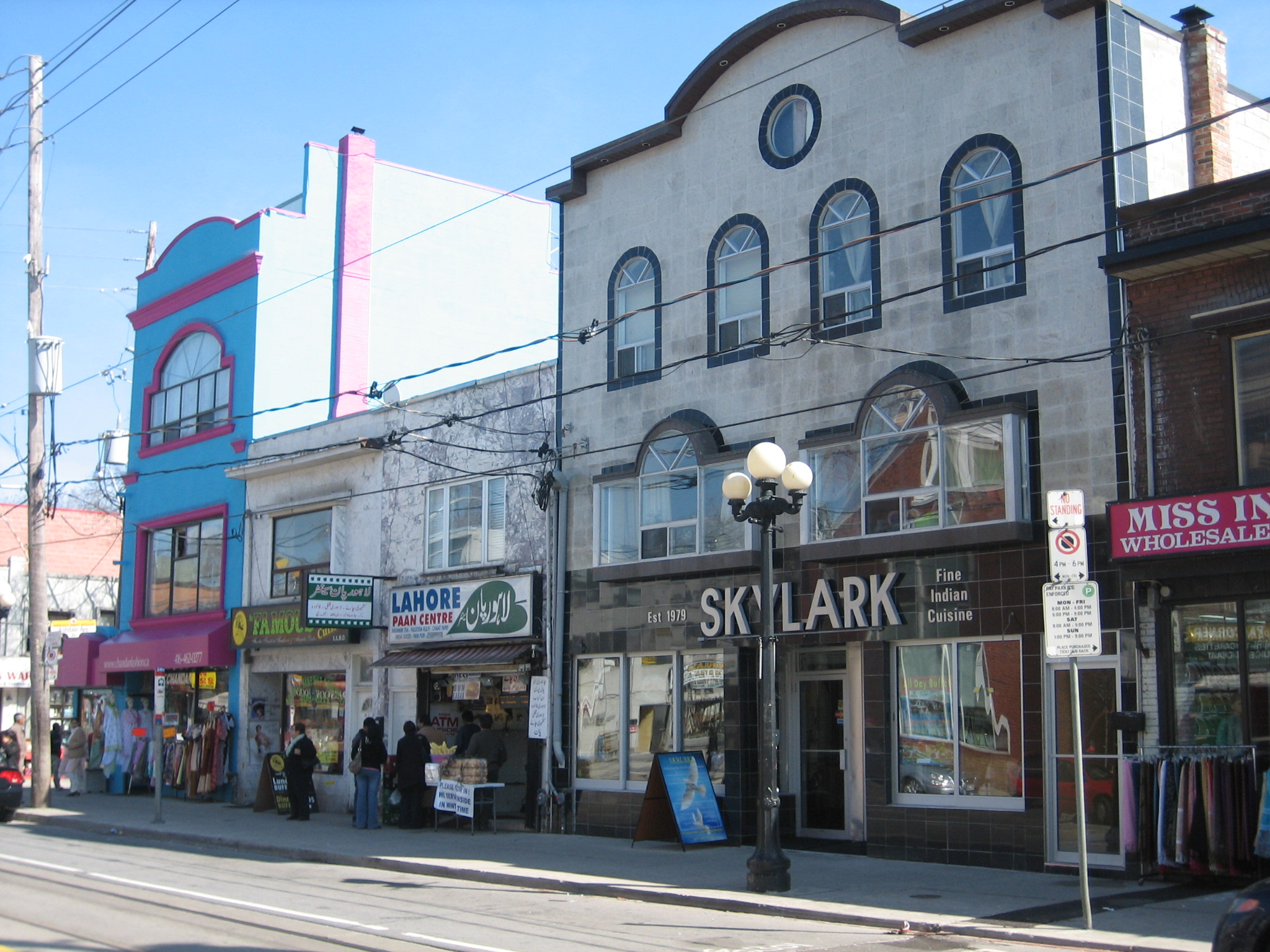
The Little India section of Gerrard Street

Gerrard Street was established on January 6, 1875 by incorporating Don Street and Lake View Avenue. It is named after Irish businessman Samuel Gerrard, a personal friend of the Honourable John McGill. The bridge over the Don River was completed and opened on December 16, 1923.

Gerrard Street begins at University Avenue in the Discovery District, surrounded by Princess Margaret Cancer Centre, Mount Sinai Hospital, Toronto General Hospital and The Hospital for Sick Children. It travels east through downtown Toronto, past Toronto Metropolitan University (formerly Ryerson University) and Regent Park before crossing the Don River on the Gerrard Street Viaduct, constructed between 1922 and 1924. The road continues through East Chinatown and Gerrard India Bazaar (also known as Little India). At Coxwell Avenue, the road deviates one block to the north; this split has led to the distinct parts being labelled as Upper and Lower Gerrard Street. Gerrard Street ends at Clonmore Avenue, west of Warden Avenue; traffic is forced onto Clonmore Avenue, where it can travel as far as Birchmount Road.

=== Carlton Street ===
Carlton Street
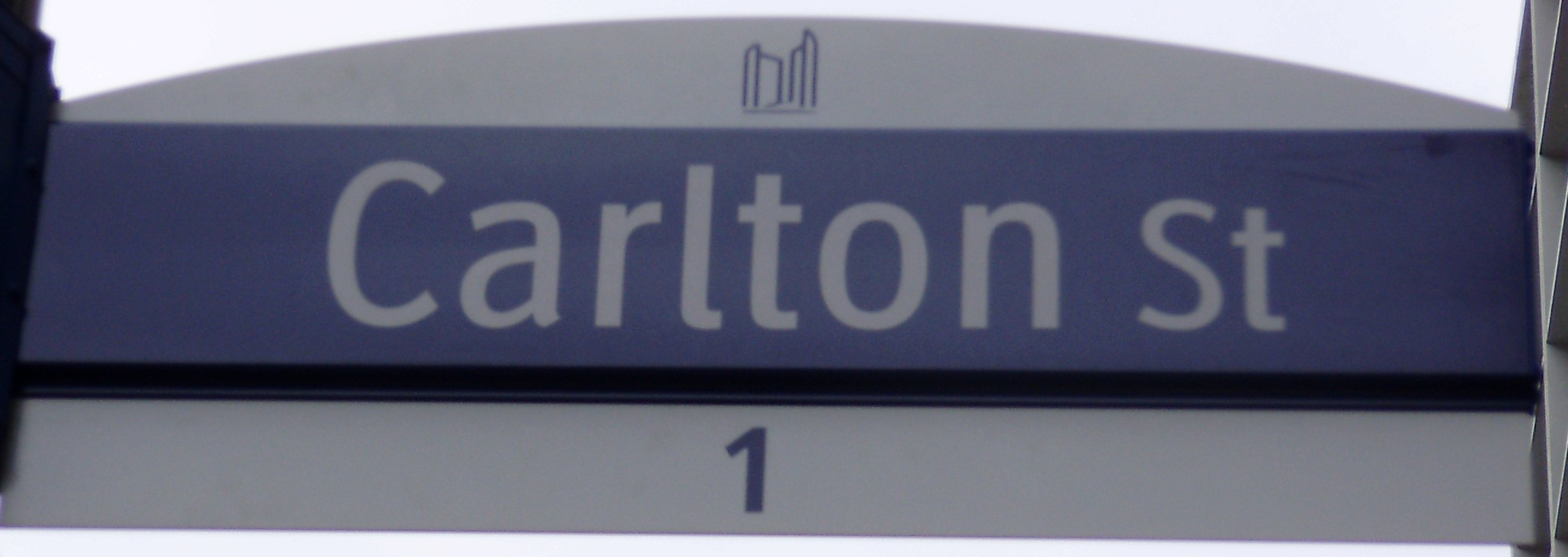
- Location: Yonge Street – Riverdale Park (continues west as College Street)

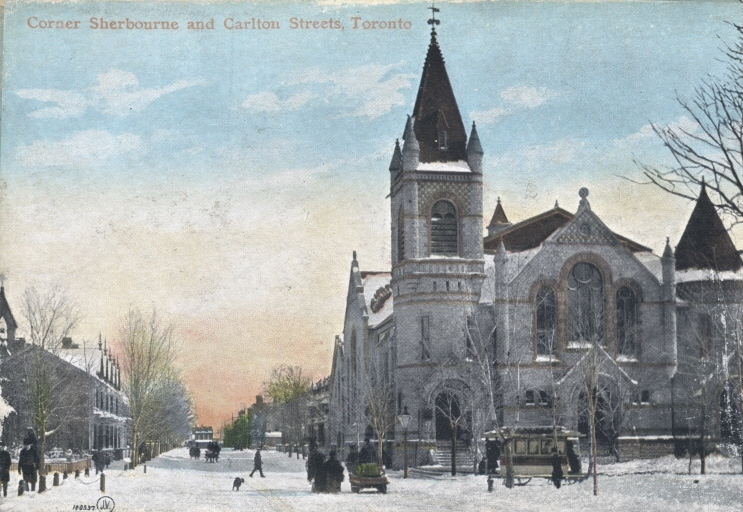
Looking east at Carlton and Sherbourne Streets circa 1910

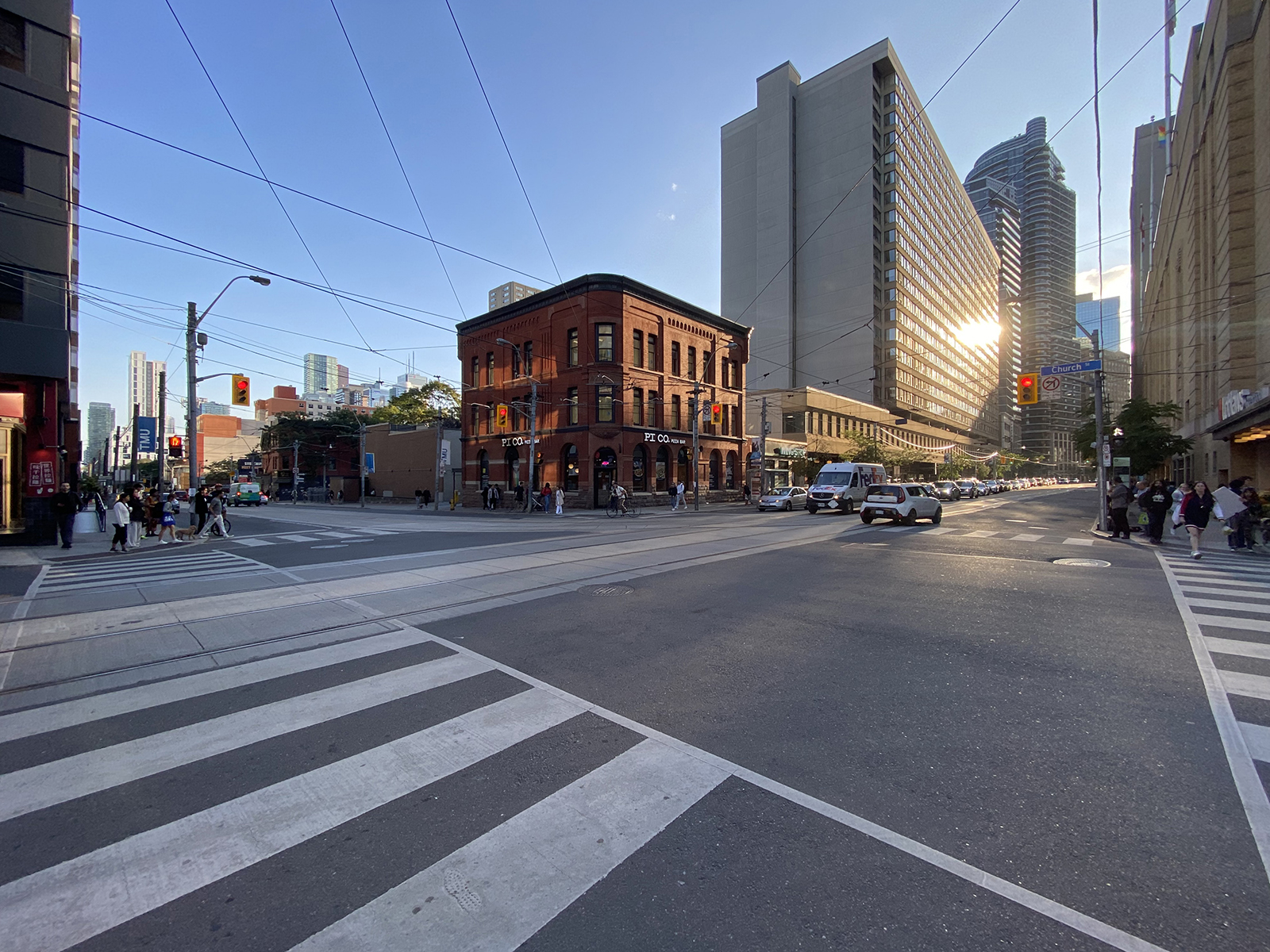
Carlton Street at Church Street in 2023

Carlton Street was named by Ann Wood, wife of both Andrew Ryan McGill and then John Strachan, after her brother, Guy Carleton Wood, who was in turn named after Guy Carleton; it is unknown when the "e" was dropped from the spelling. In 1930, as part of a depression relief program, Carlton Street was realigned east of Yonge Street in order to meet with College Street. The realignment can be seen at the site of the Richard R. Horkins building (the one-time head office of the Toronto Hydro at 14 Carlton Street), where Carlton Street (heading west) suddenly angles in a northwesterly direction to meet Yonge Street. Prior to that, Carlton Street met Yonge Street south of the present intersection by several dozen metres. The completed intersection was opened in early June 1931.

Carlton Street is home to Maple Leaf Gardens; Toronto Maple Leafs mascot, Carlton the Bear, is named after this street. It extends from Yonge Street east to Parliament Street as a major thoroughfare. After a sharp jog north at Parliament Street, Carlton continues east of Parliament as a residential street, ending at the edge of Riverdale Park.

The street is also home to several of the city's Franco-Ontarian cultural institutions, including the Sacré-Cœur church and the Collège Français high school, while the head office of TFO is located in the College Park complex at the intersection of Yonge Street with Carlton's westerly continuation as College Street. In 2011, several of these institutions have collaborated with Assemblée de la francophonie de l'Ontario (Francophone Assembly of Ontario) on a proposal to have the area formally designated as the city's "French Quarter".

The 506 Carlton streetcar line is named for the street, even though this is only a small part of its route; the name is retained for historical continuity.

=== College Street ===
College Street
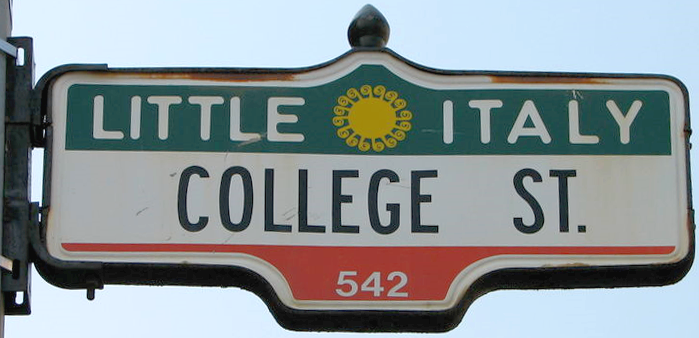
- Location: Dundas Street West – Yonge Street (continues east as Carlton Street)

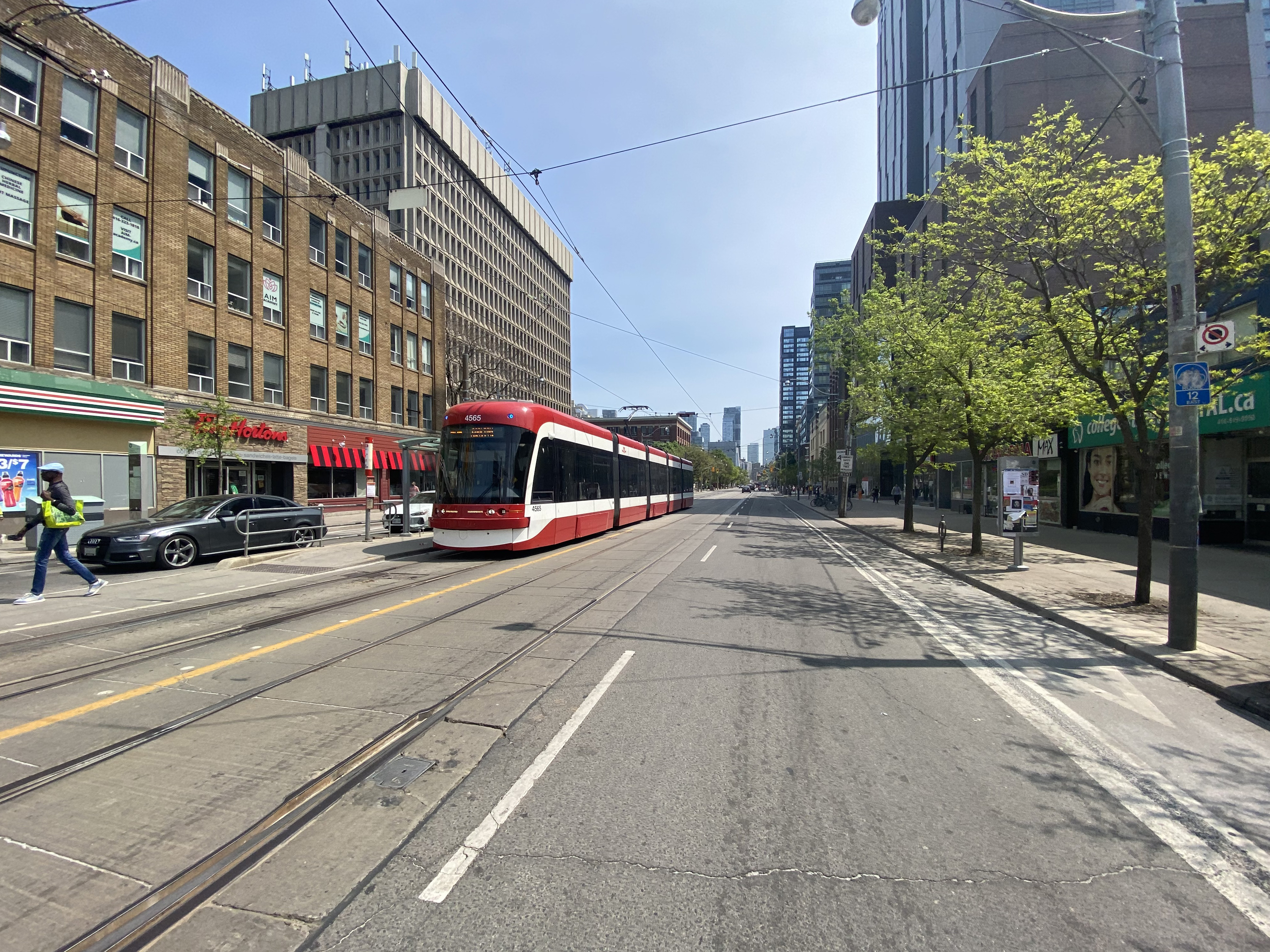
College Street near Spadina Avenue in 2023

College Street shares its origins with University Avenue as one of the two private entrances to King's College opened in 1829. King's College, now known as the University of Toronto, was the first college in Upper Canada when it was chartered by Henry, 3rd Earl of Bathurst two years earlier. The road began at a gatehouse at Yonge Street and progressed westward to present-day University Avenue. Like University Avenue, College Street was surrounded by gates in an attempt to create an elegant driveway like those in Oxford and Cambridge.

Little Italy, the northern edges of Kensington Market and Chinatown, and the southern edge of the University of Toronto St. George campus are along College Street.

=== Wellesley Street ===
Wellesley Street
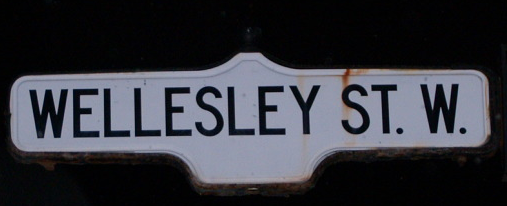
- Location: Queen's Park Crescent – Wellesley Park

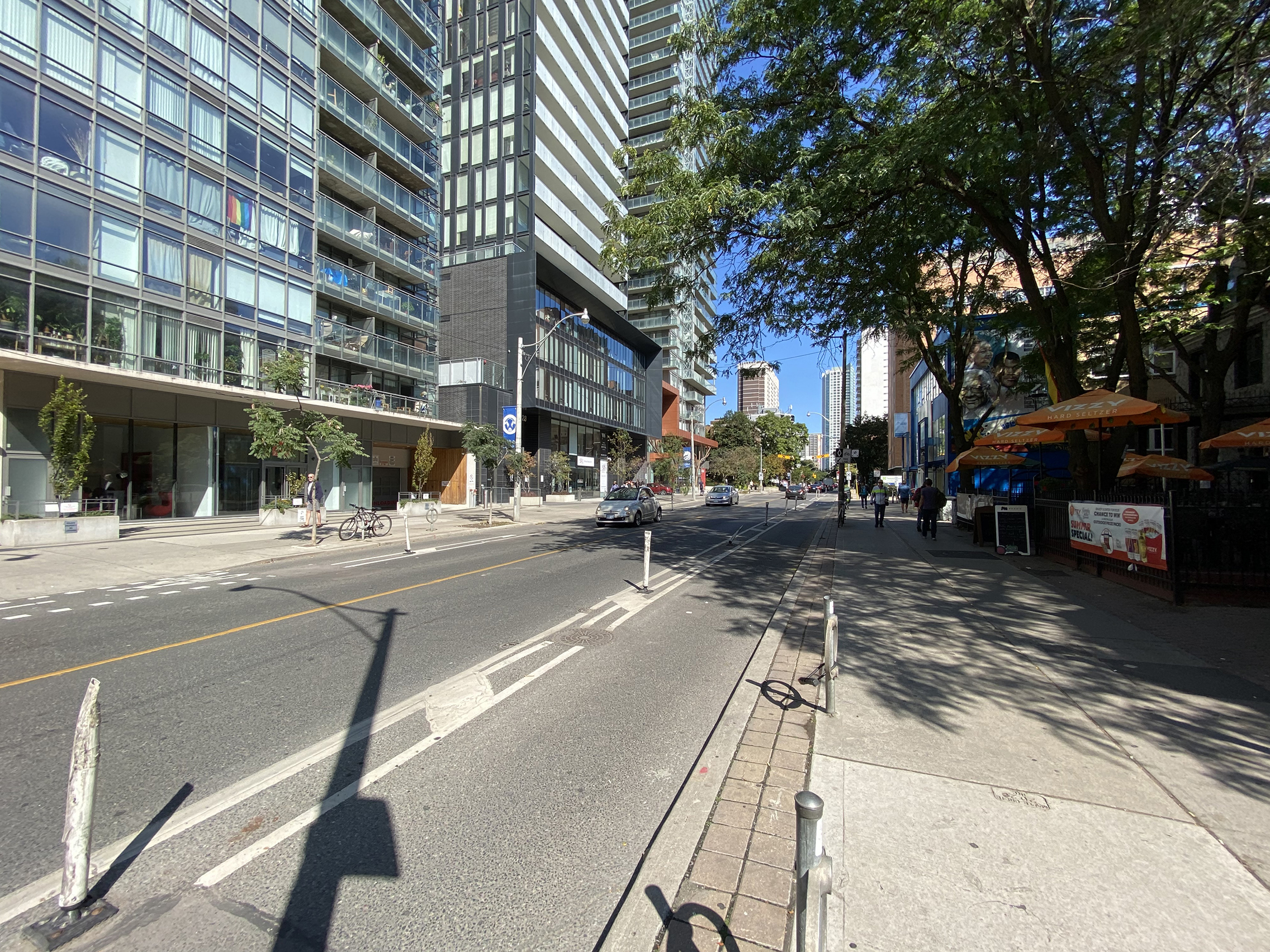
Looking east on Wellesley Street in 2023

Wellesley Street is named after Arthur Wellesley, 1st Duke of Wellington, who is best known for his victory over Napoleon at the Battle of Waterloo in 1815, and for a short and unpopular tenure as Prime Minister of Britain between 1828 and 1830.

Wellesley Street begins at the entrance to the University of Toronto at Queen's Park Crescent. The road passes immediately north of the Ontario Legislative Building, bisecting Queen's Park and separating the legislative building from the greenspace portion of the park. The main entrance of Wellesley station on Line 1 Yonge–University of the city's subway system is located just east of the corner of Wellesley Street with Yonge Street. East of Yonge Street, Wellesley Street serves as one of the defining streets of the Church and Wellesley district, the city's primary gay village. Further east past Sherbourne Street, the street marks the boundary between the St. James Town and Cabbagetown neighbourhoods.

The road's status as a significant arterial thoroughfare ends at Parliament Street, although it continues as a residential street for a further half-kilometre before ending at Wellesley Park overlooking the Don Valley.

=== Harbord Street ===
Harbord Street
- Location: St. George Street – Ossington Avenue (continues east as Hoskin Street)

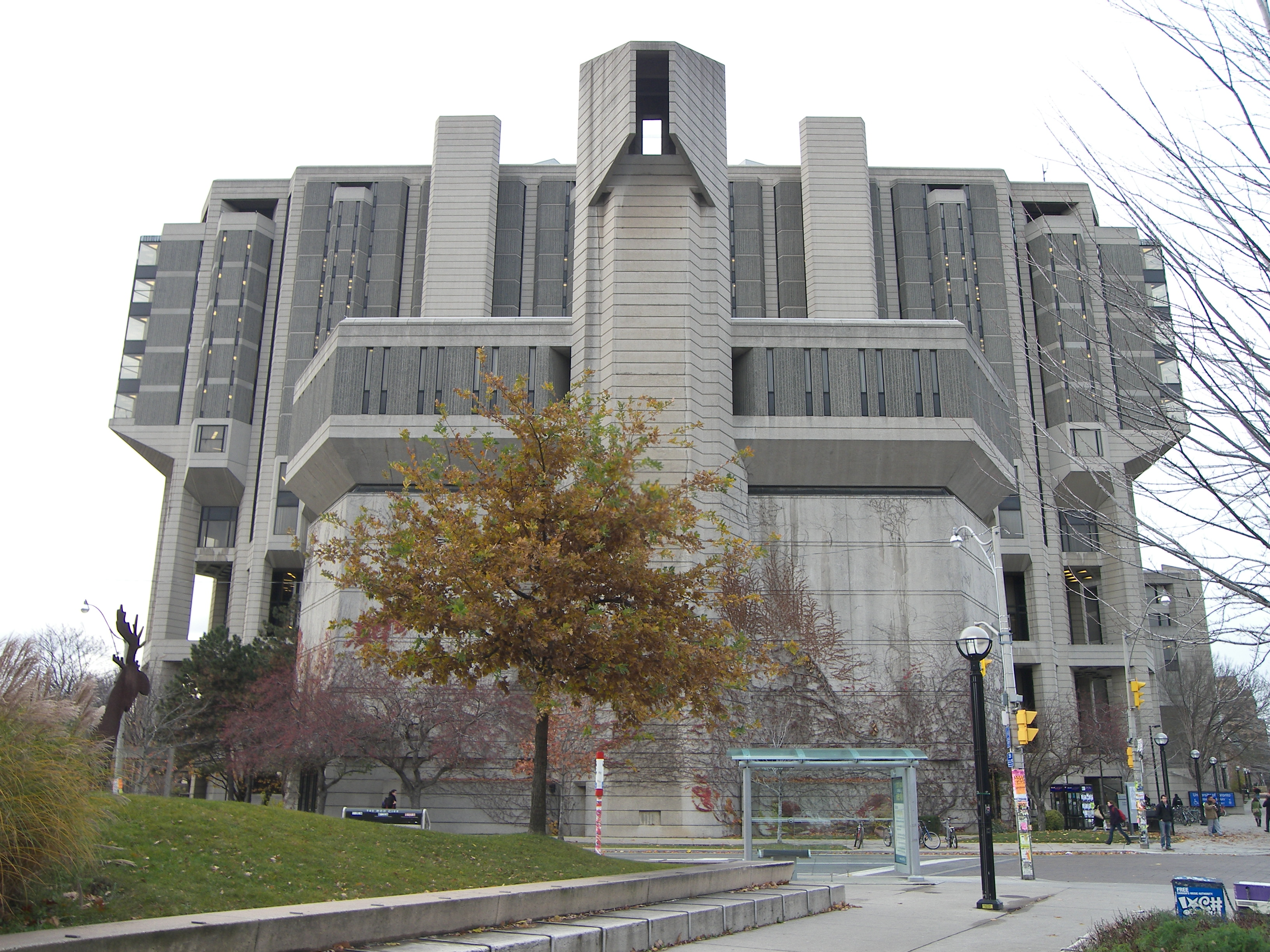
Robarts Library in front of Harbord Street in the University of Toronto St. George campus

There is no definite historic link for the name for Harbord Street, but it is believed to be associated to Charles Harbord, 5th Baron Suffield.

=== Bloor Street ===
Bloor Street
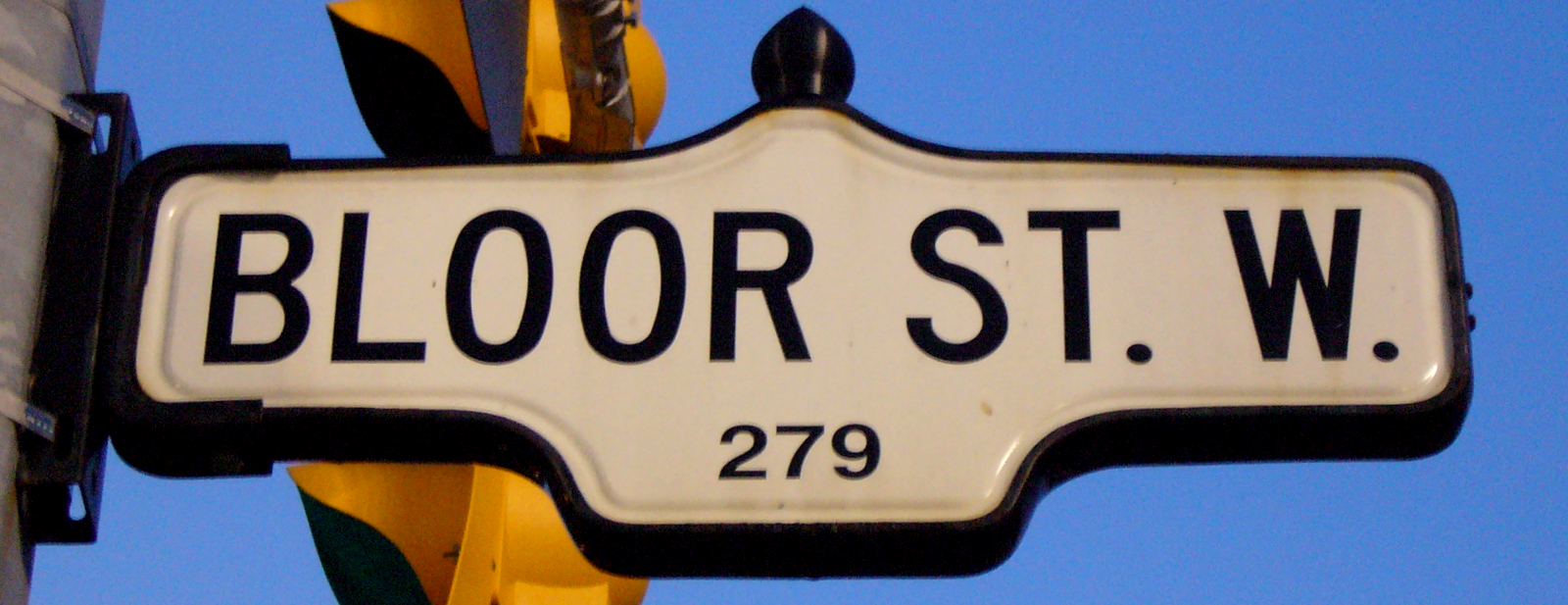
- Location: Etobicoke Creek – Prince Edward Viaduct (continues east of viaduct as Danforth Avenue and west into Mississauga)

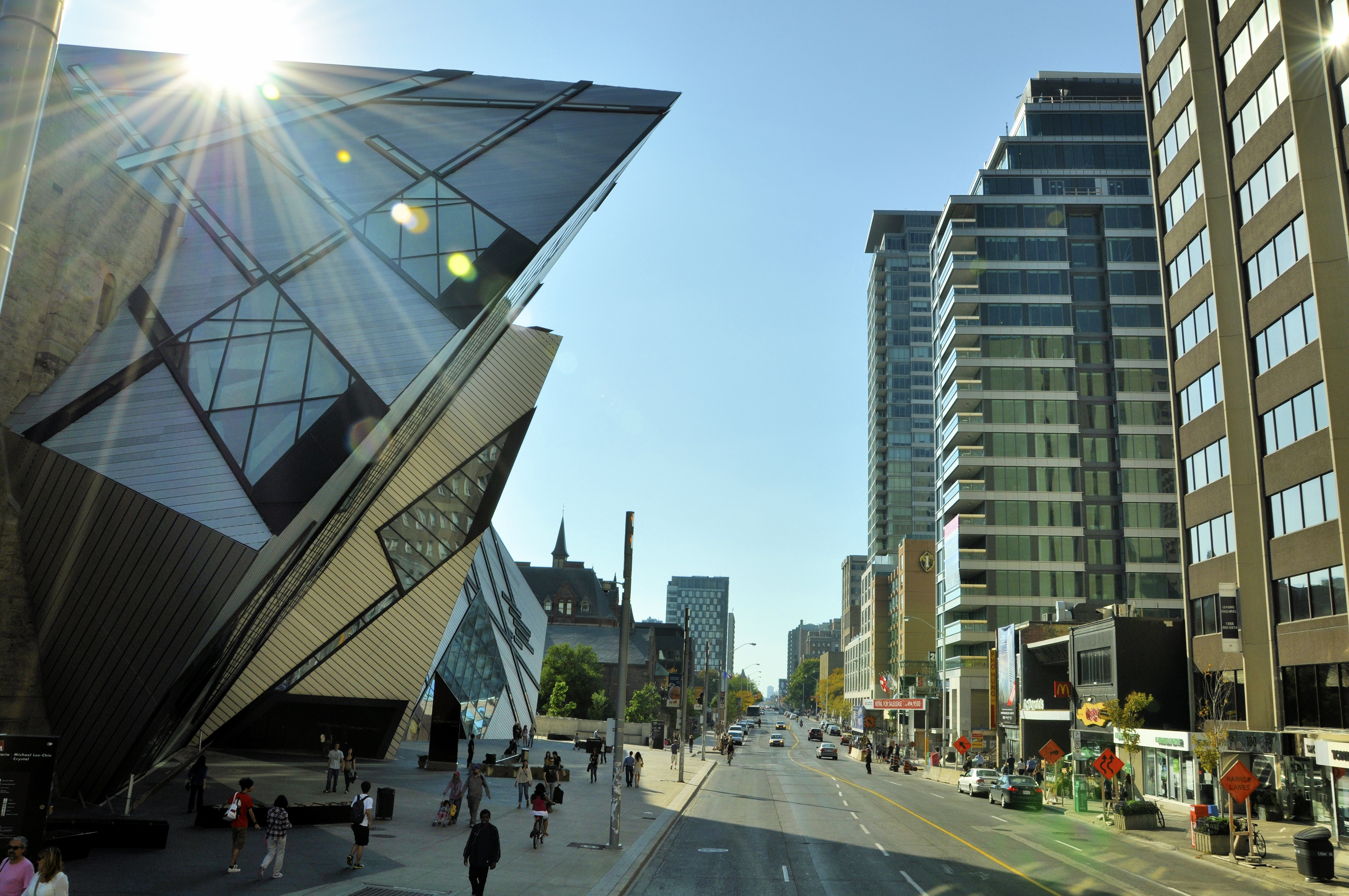
Looking west on Bloor Street from Avenue Road / Queens [sic] Park in 2011

Bloor Street was named by 1855 after Joseph Bloore. (Note: The vast majority of publications spell Joseph's surname Bloore, as the name is inscribed on his grave and interment record. Henry Scadding (1873) spells it Bloor) It was surveyed as the first concession road north of the baseline (now Queen Street). It has been known by many names, including the Tollgate Road (as the first tollgate on Yonge north of Lot Street was constructed there in 1820), then St. Paul's Road (after the nearby church, constructed 1842), and possibly Sydenham Road (after Lord Sydenham, Governor General 1839–1841). (Note: Sydenham Road is noted by Henry Scadding (1873). However, street maps show that this was more likely an early name for Cumberland Street in Yorkville.) Although Bloore had an "e" at the end of his surname, Bloor Street was never spelled with it, as evidenced on numerous maps produced before his death. Between Dundas Street and its east end, it was originally a part of Ontario Highway 5 before being transferred to the city.

Canada's most expensive shopping district is located on the Mink Mile section of Bloor Street.

=== Danforth Avenue ===
Danforth Avenue
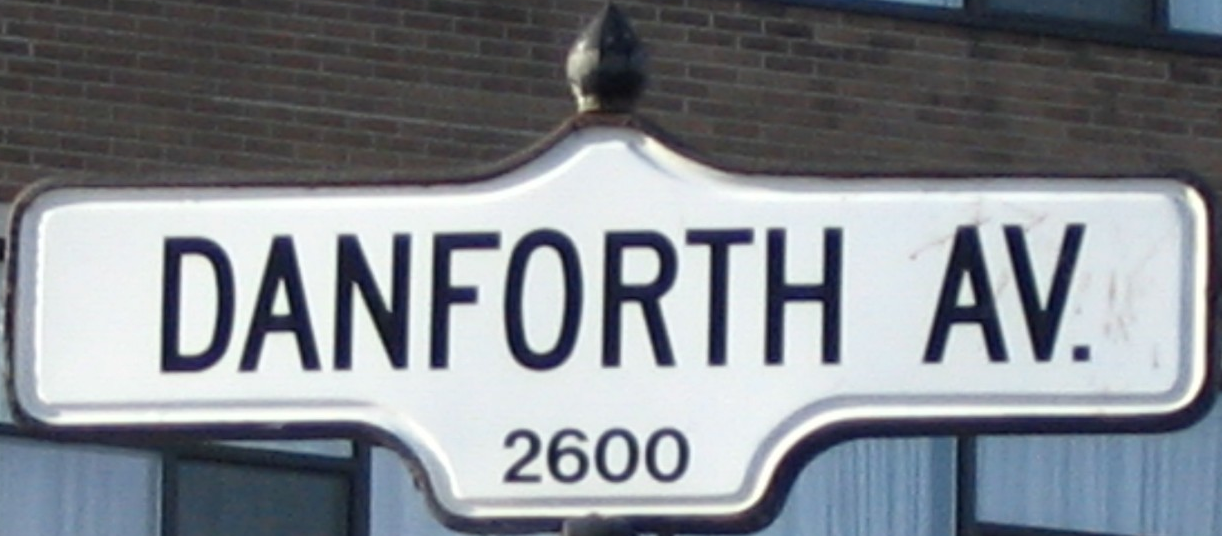
- Length: 9.1 km (5.7 mi)
- Location: Prince Edward Viaduct – Kingston Road (continues west of viaduct as Bloor Street East)

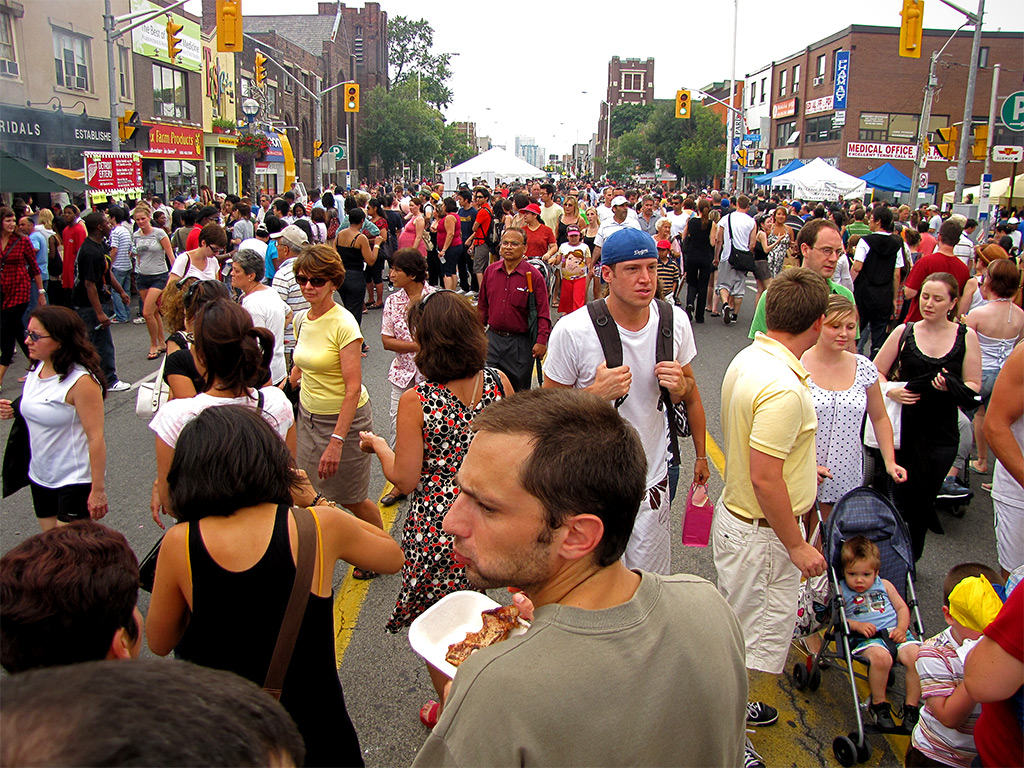
"Taste of the Danforth" attracts one million visitors over three days every August in Greektown.

Danforth Avenue, known as the Don and Danforth Road until 1871, takes its name from pioneer road builder Asa Danforth, who built the Governors Road and Danforth Road by the end of the 18th century, under the direction of surveyor general Augustus Jones. Danforth Avenue, however, was constructed in 1851 by the Don and Danforth Plank Road Company, connecting the Don Mills Road (now Broadview Avenue north of Danforth Avenue) with the Danforth Road. The road was extended east to Kingston Road (formerly Highway 2) in 1935, which included the construction of the present interchange.

Greektown is located on Danforth Avenue between Chester Avenue and Dewhurst Boulevard.

Danforth Avenue was the site of a mass shooting that took place on July 22, 2018.

=== Annette Street ===
Annette Street
- Location: Jane Street – Keele Street (continues east as Dupont Street)

Annette Street is named after Annette Greene (1837–1900), wife of developer and barrister Columbus Hopkins Greene (1830–1921).

=== Dupont Street ===
Dupont Street
- Length: 4.8 km (3.0 mi)
- Location: Dundas Street – Avenue Road (continues west as Annette Street)

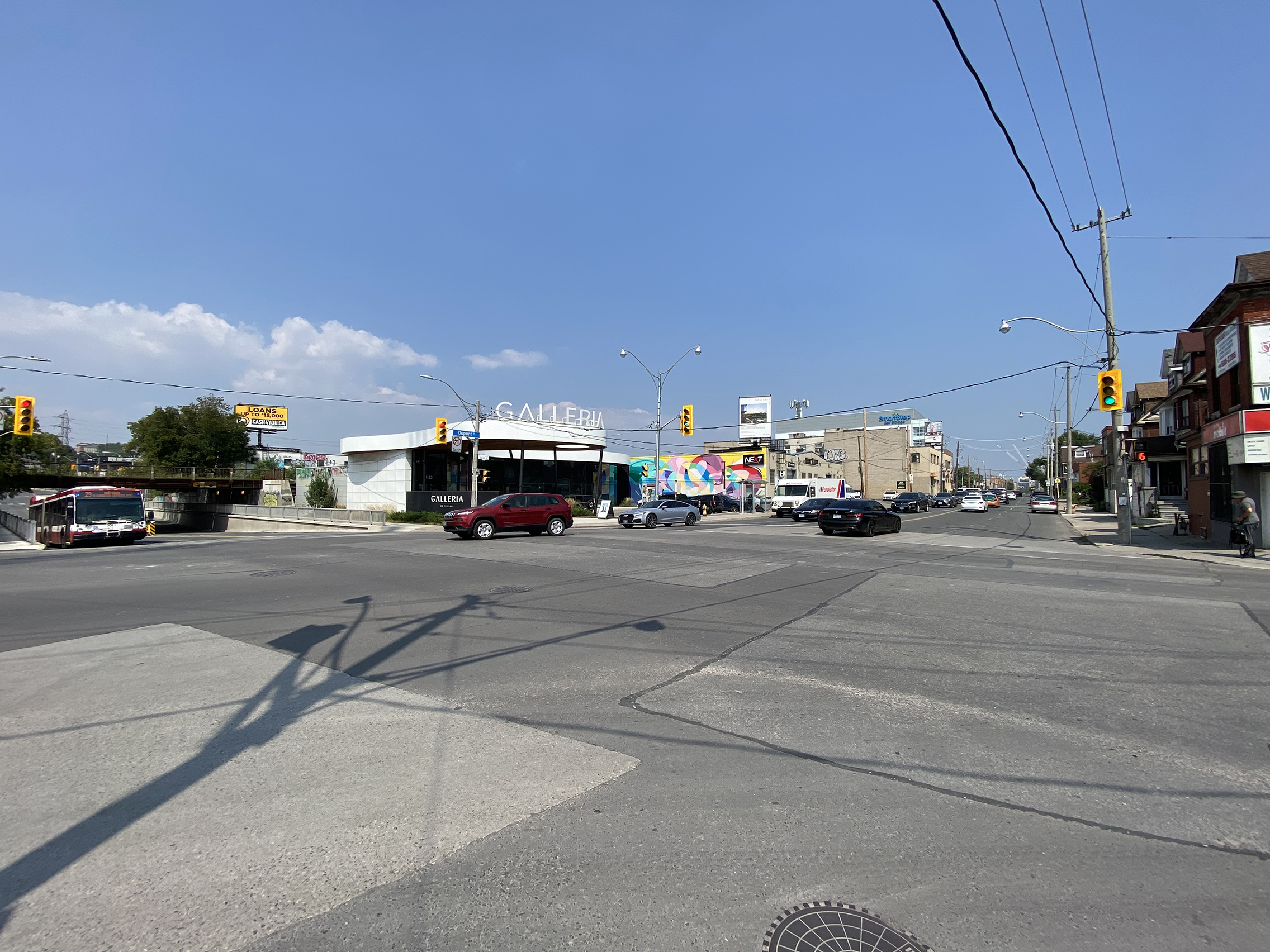
Dupont Street at Dufferin Street in 2023

Dupont Street is named for George Dupont Wells, son of Colonel Joseph Wells. George was one of the first students of Upper Canada College, and several other streets are named after him. These include Wells Street and Wells Hill. Dupont Street runs parallel to (though with a few jogs) and south of the CPR Midtown tracks west from Avenue Road where the street begins. Dupont Street ends at Dundas Street where it continues as Annette Street. The Galleria Mall, located on the southwest corner of Dupont Street and Dufferin Street, was the only enclosed shopping centre located on Dupont Street, as well as in Old Toronto west of Avenue Road and north of Bloor Street / Danforth Avenue. The mall closed in 2019 and was demolished in 2020 for condo redevelopment. Dupont station of Line 1 Yonge–University serves this street at Spadina Road.

=== Davenport Road ===
Davenport Road
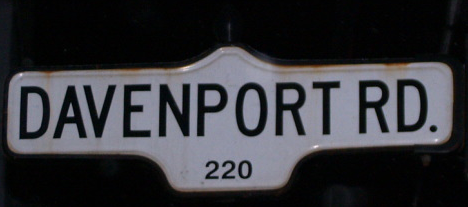
- Length: 6.4 km (4.0 mi)
- Location: Old Weston Road – Yonge Street (continues east as Church Street west as Old Weston Road)

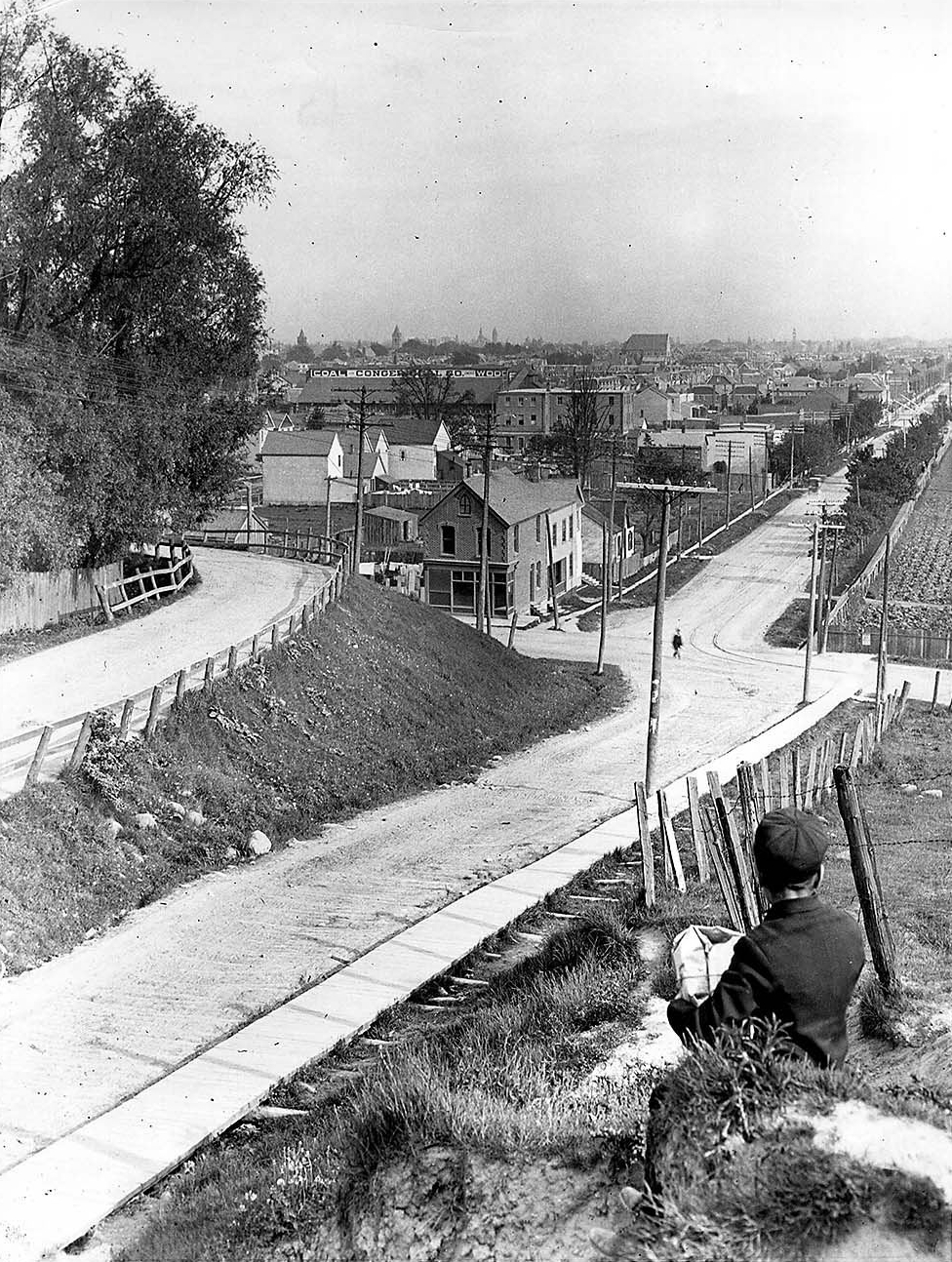
Bathurst Street descends the Lake Iroquois shoreline; Davenport is the road at the bottom of the hill.

Davenport Road takes its name from the Davenport House, the first estate atop the Lake Iroquois shoreline and home of Colonel Joseph Wells, father of George Dupont Wells. The estate stood northeast of the modern Bathurst Street and Davenport Road intersection. Wells purchased the property from Adjutant John McGill in 1821 and rebuilt the house that occupied it. McGill built the original house in 1797 and supposedly named it after Major Davenport, who was stationed at Fort York at that time.

Davenport Road follows a native trail named "Gete-Onigaming" in Ojibwe along the foot of the escarpment of the old Lake Iroquois shoreline. The section east of Bathurst Street was formerly a part of Vaughan Road. It runs from Yonge Street to Old Weston Road.

=== Burnhamthorpe Road ===
Burnhamthorpe Road
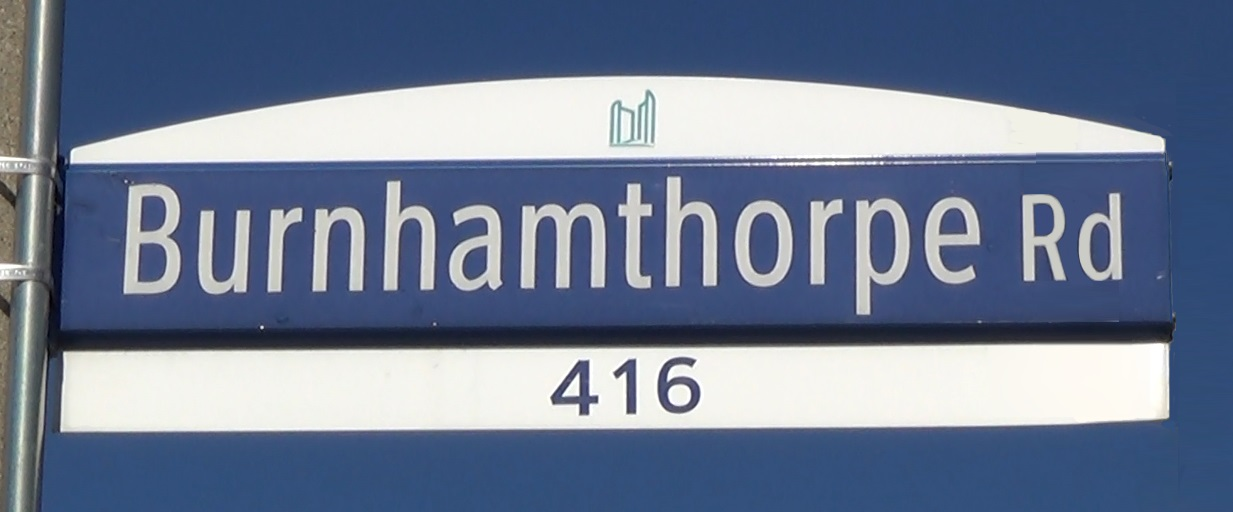
- Location: Etobicoke Creek – Dundas Street West (continues southeast as Cordova Avenue and west into Mississauga)

Burnhamthorpe Road is named after a village in Mississauga, which in turn was named by settler John Abelson for his home Burnham Thorpe, England. The street only runs for a short distance in Toronto, where it begins at Dundas Street, but it becomes one of the main arterial roads across the City of Mississauga to the west before reaching its western terminus just west of, and after breaking at, Sixteen Mile Creek in Oakville. The street was originally called Mono Sixth Line Road.

=== O'Connor Drive ===
O'Connor Drive
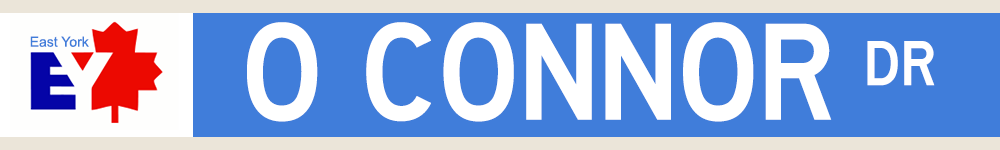
- Location: Broadview Avenue – Victoria Park Avenue (continues east as Eglinton Square then Eglinton Avenue East south as Broadview Avenue)

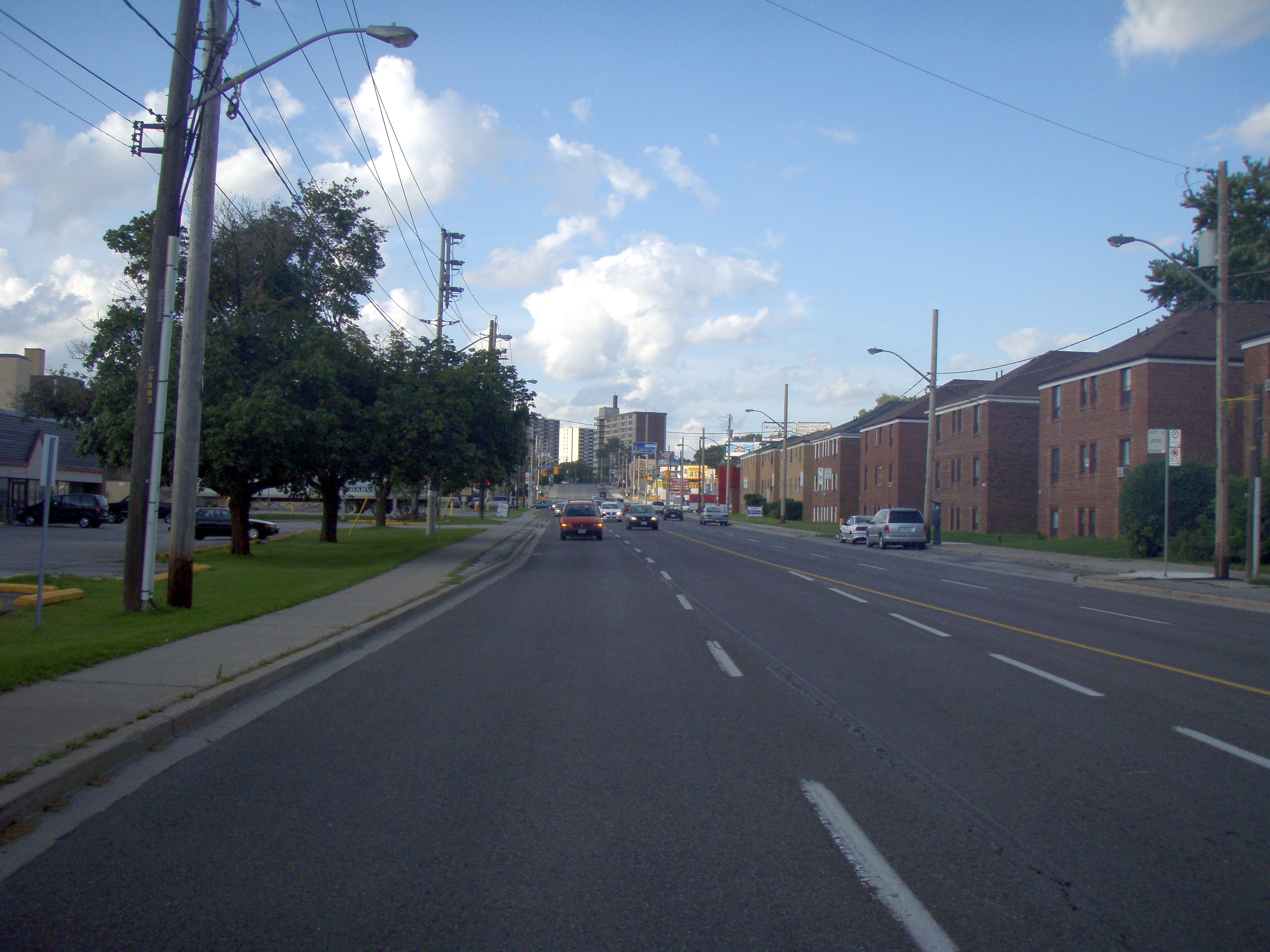
O'Connor Drive north of St. Clair Avenue

O'Connor Drive takes its name from Senator Frank Patrick O'Connor, who owned Maryvale farm in Scarborough Township. In 1913, O'Connor opened the Laura Secord Candy Shop on Yonge Street named after War of 1812 heroine Laura Secord, which has since become a national chain. O'Connor Drive begins at the northern terminus of Broadview Avenue and progresses east to Woodbine Avenue, where it turns to the northeast and continues to Victoria Park Avenue and Eglinton Avenue. The first several kilometres were originally part of the Don Mills Road until 1922. The section from Glenwood Crescent to Woodbine Avenue crosses over Taylor-Massey Creek. The 246-metre (807 ft) bridge was completed in 1931 by R. H. McGregor Construction Company and Margison and Babcock Engineers.

=== Rathburn Road ===
Rathburn Road
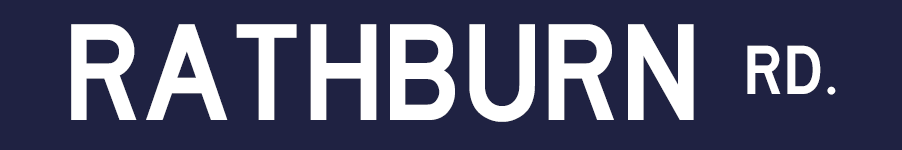
- Location: Etobicoke Creek – Islington Avenue (does not cross Etobicoke Creek, but resumes in Mississauga).

Rathburn Road is a street in Etobicoke and Mississauga, which roughly parallels Burnhamthorpe Road to its north between the Credit River and Islington Avenue, breaking at the Etobicoke Creek, which divides the two cities. Its street name was acquired in 1954 to avoid name duplication and before known as Rosethorn Road.

=== St. Clair Avenue ===
St. Clair Avenue
- Location: Scarlett Road – Kingston Road (interrupted by Don Valley)

St. Clair Avenue, once the Third Concession, crosses through a majority of the city. The road is separated into two sections by the Don Valley. The western segment begins east of the Humber River at Scarlett Road in the former city of York, where it is angled and does not follow the concession line as a result of road realignments for the construction of the Canadian Pacific Railway crossing in 1912. From there, it proceeds east past Runnymede Road, where it enters Old Toronto. After that, it continues to run past the Vale of Avoca to east of Mount Pleasant Road, but stops short of the Don valley. On the opposite side, it begins near O'Connor Drive and continues along the same alignment to Kingston Road. St. Clair Avenue takes its name from Augustine St. Clare, a character from the novel Uncle Tom's Cabin.

=== Davisville Avenue ===
Davisville Avenue
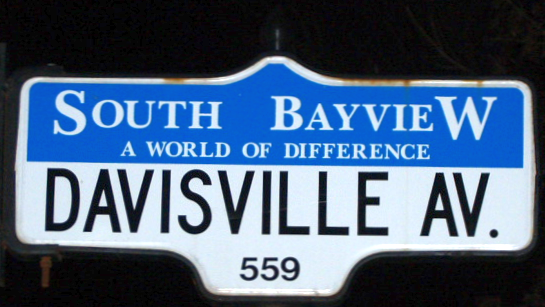
- Length: 1.9 km (1.2 mi)
- Location: Yonge Street – Bayview Avenue (continues west as Chaplin Crescent)

Davisville Avenue is named after John Davis, who opened Davis Pottery at Yonge Street and Davisville in 1845. Davis Pottery became nationally renowned; Davis used the newfound fortune to build schools and churches, and became the first postmaster of the growing village. Davisville Avenue was built in the early 20th century as one of several roads connecting Yonge Street with the planned town of Leaside. It begins as a continuation of Chaplin Crescent at Yonge Street and proceeds 2 km (1.2 mi) eastwards to Bayview Avenue.

=== Millwood Road ===
Millwood Road
- Location: Yonge Street – Leaside Bridge (continues south of Leaside Bridge as Pape Avenue and Donlands Avenue)

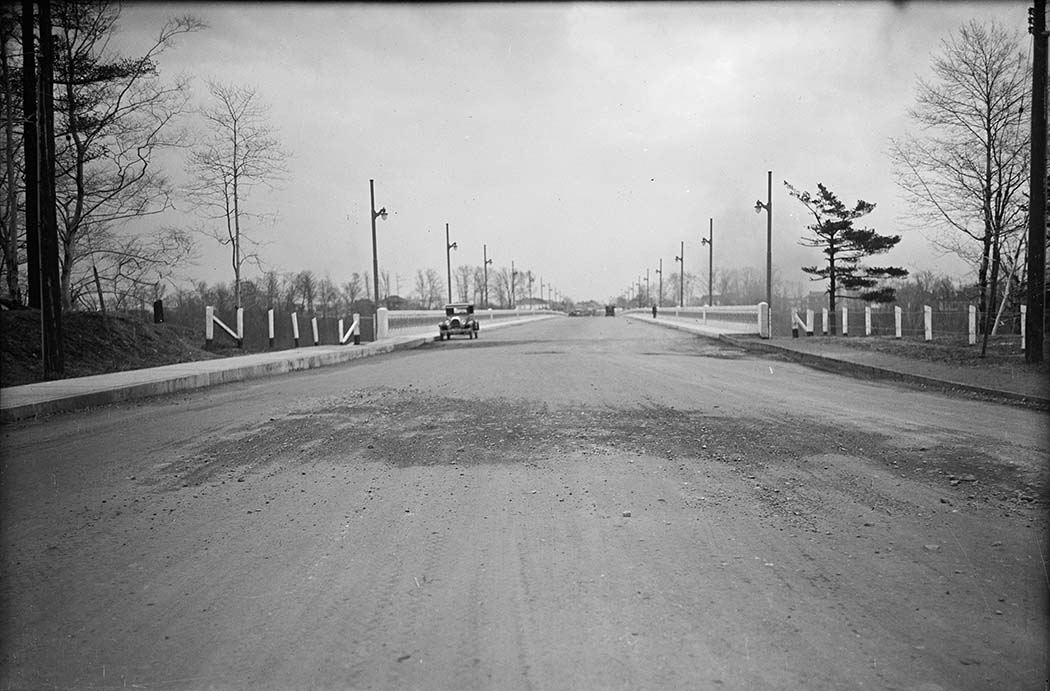
Looking south on Millwood Road to Leaside Bridge (then known as Leside Viaduct), 1928

Millwood Road begins one block north of Davisville Avenue at Yonge Street, intersects Bayview Avenue going through Leaside, and passes by the west side of the Thorncliffe Park neighbourhood at Overlea Boulevard.

=== Overlea Boulevard ===
Overlea Boulevard
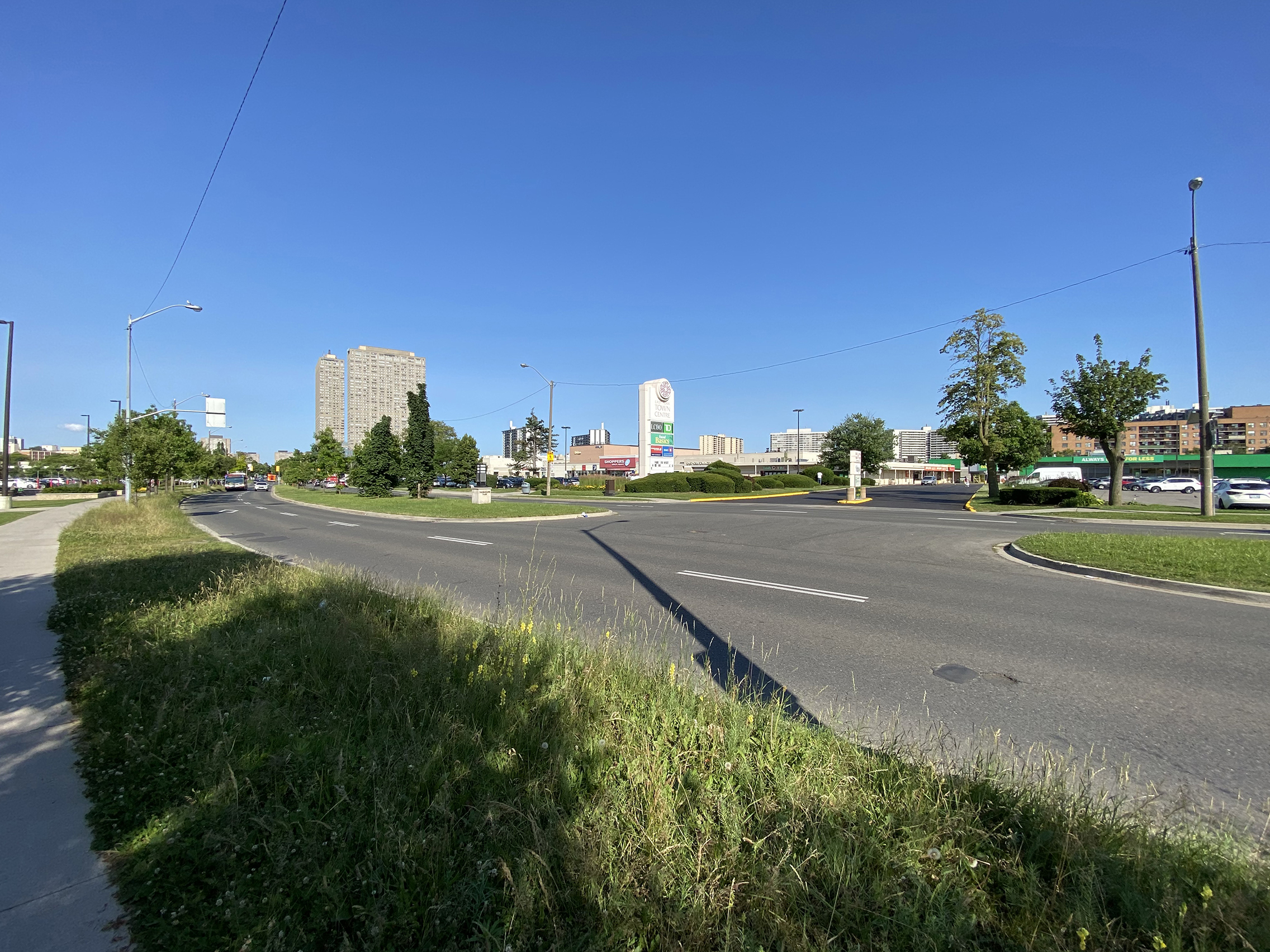
- Location: Millwood Road – Don Mills Road (continues east as Gateway Boulevard)

Overlea Boulevard is a major arterial road in Thorncliffe Park that is the neighbourhood's main thoroughfare, with predominantly commercial businesses on its north side and residential to the south. It travels east for approximately 1.8 kilometres (1.1 mi) from Millwood Road, crossing the Charles H. Hiscott Bridge before terminating at Don Mills Road. Overlea Boulevard continues east into southern Flemingdon Park as Gateway Boulevard.

Coca-Cola's Canadian head office was located at 42–46 Overlea Boulevard from 1965 to 2013, when it moved to downtown Toronto. An on-site bottling plant was demolished after its production line was relocated to Brampton, including a 1964 Walter Yarwood sculpture called Coca-Cola that stood in front of it. The head office complex, designed by Mathers and Haldenby, was listed on the City of Toronto's heritage registrar in 2012. Its façade is incorporated into a Costco retail location that opened in 2018.

In a November 2020 report, Surface Transit Network Plan Update, Overlea Boulevard along with Don Mills Road and Pape Avenue were identified as the ninth most important surface transit corridor by the City of Toronto's Transportation Services Division, City Planning Division, and the Toronto Transit Commission. Metrolinx plans to build an elevated Thorncliffe Park Station at the intersection of Overlea Boulevard and Thorncliffe Park Drive (west side) as part of its Ontario Line project.

During the COVID-19 pandemic, East Toronto Health Partners operated a mass immunization clinic at East York Town Centre at 45 Overlea Boulevard. Opened on March 24, 2021, it was the fourth such facility in the City of Toronto.

=== Rogers Road ===
Rogers Road
- Location: Weston Road – Oakwood Avenue

Rogers Road is named after Stephen Rogers, who immigrated from Teignmouth, Devon and built one of the first houses in the Oakwood area in 1876 at the present corners of Rogers Road and Oakwood Avenue. It was constructed in the 1920s to serve Prospect Cemetery. The road crosses between Weston Road (incorporating a former section of Old Weston Road) and Oakwood Avenue along the southern boundary of the former city of York. It had its own streetcar line, which was later replaced by a trolley bus line, in turn later replaced by the route 161 Rogers Road bus.

=== Eglinton Avenue ===
Eglinton Avenue
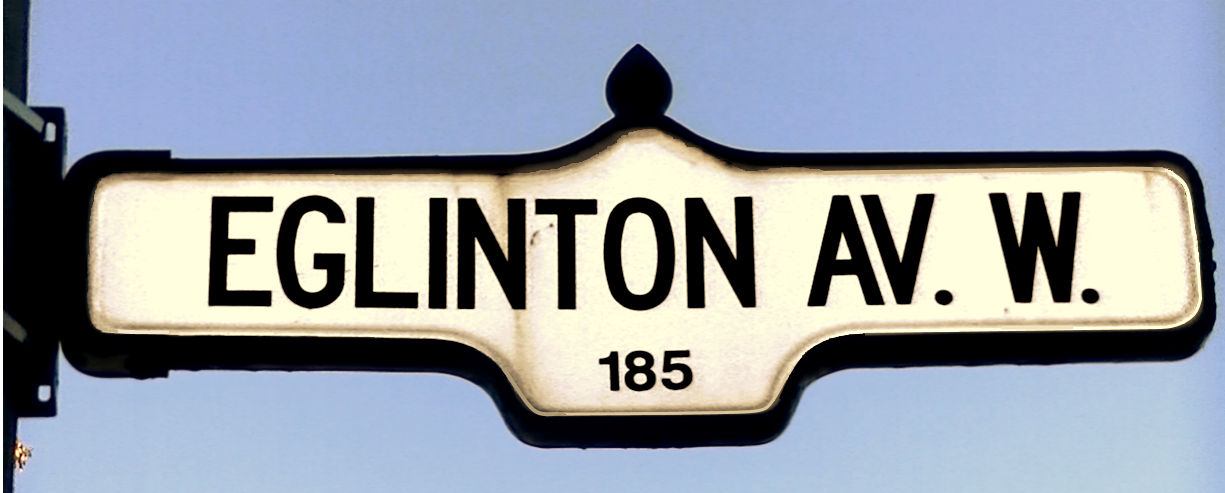
- Location: Etobicoke Creek – Kingston Road (continues west into Mississauga)

Eglinton Avenue, once the Fourth Concession, takes its name from the village that was established at its intersection with Yonge Street. There are several possible origins of the name, all of which lead back to the Earl of Eglinton. Several Scottish veterans of the War of 1812 settled in the area, possibly naming it after their Earl of Eglinton, Hugh Montgomerie. Hugh's successor, Archibald William Montgomerie, was famous for a lavish tournament held at his Eglinton Castle in 1839. For two years prior to the formation of Metropolitan Toronto, the section of Eglinton Avenue through Scarborough was known as Highway 109.

Eglinton Avenue is the only road in Toronto to cross all six former municipalities. It begins in Mississauga and travels east through Richview, Mount Dennis, Little Jamaica, North Toronto, Leaside, the Golden Mile, Brimley and Scarborough Village before ending at Kingston Road. The majority of Eglinton Avenue is abutted by commercial strip plazas, auto dealerships, and dense apartment blocks, though almost every zoning condition presents itself along the road. The route is heavily congested, which is being alleviated by Line 5 Eglinton, an LRT line with a substantial underground section that opened for revenue service in February 2026.

Old Eglinton Avenue west of Bermondsey Road was the result of re-alignment of the road to connect sections of Eglinton Avenue that is further north than the eastern section.

Until 1954, it was a part of Ontario Highway 109.

=== Roselawn Avenue ===
Roselawn Avenue
- Location: Fairbank Avenue – Yonge Street

Roselawn Avenue is a minor collector road that runs from Yonge Street to just west of Dufferin Street. However, between just east of Marlee Avenue and Bathurst Street in Forest Hill, Roselawn Avenue becomes Elm Ridge Drive, which has a large traffic circle containing Nicol MacNicol Parkette.

=== Blythwood Road ===
Blythwood Road
- Length: 1.8 km (1.1 mi)
- Location: Yonge Street – Bayview Avenue

Blythwood Road is a minor collector road, which connects Yonge Street with Bayview Avenue and the Sunnybrook Health Sciences Centre.

=== Glencairn Avenue ===
Glencairn Avenue
- Location: Caledonia Road – Yonge Street

Glencairn Avenue is an east–west collector road in Toronto. It starts at Caledonia Road and finishes at Yonge Street.

=== Lawrence Avenue ===
Lawrence Avenue
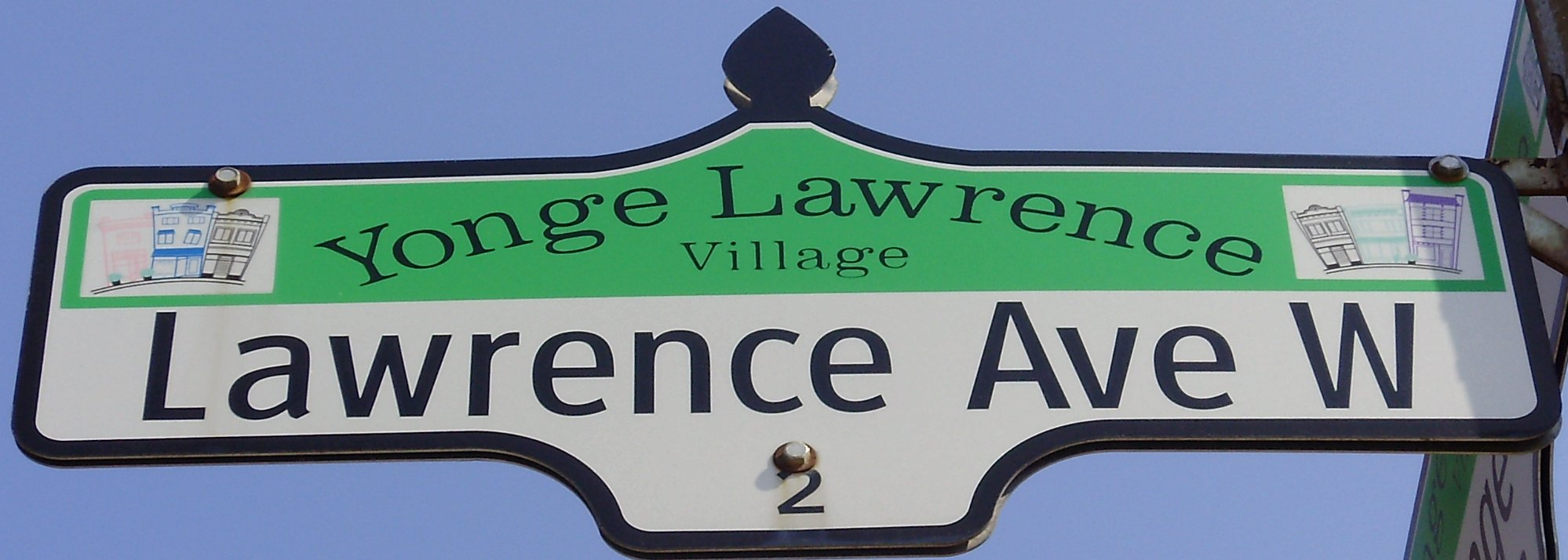
- Location: Royal York Road – Rouge Hills Drive (continues west as The Westway)

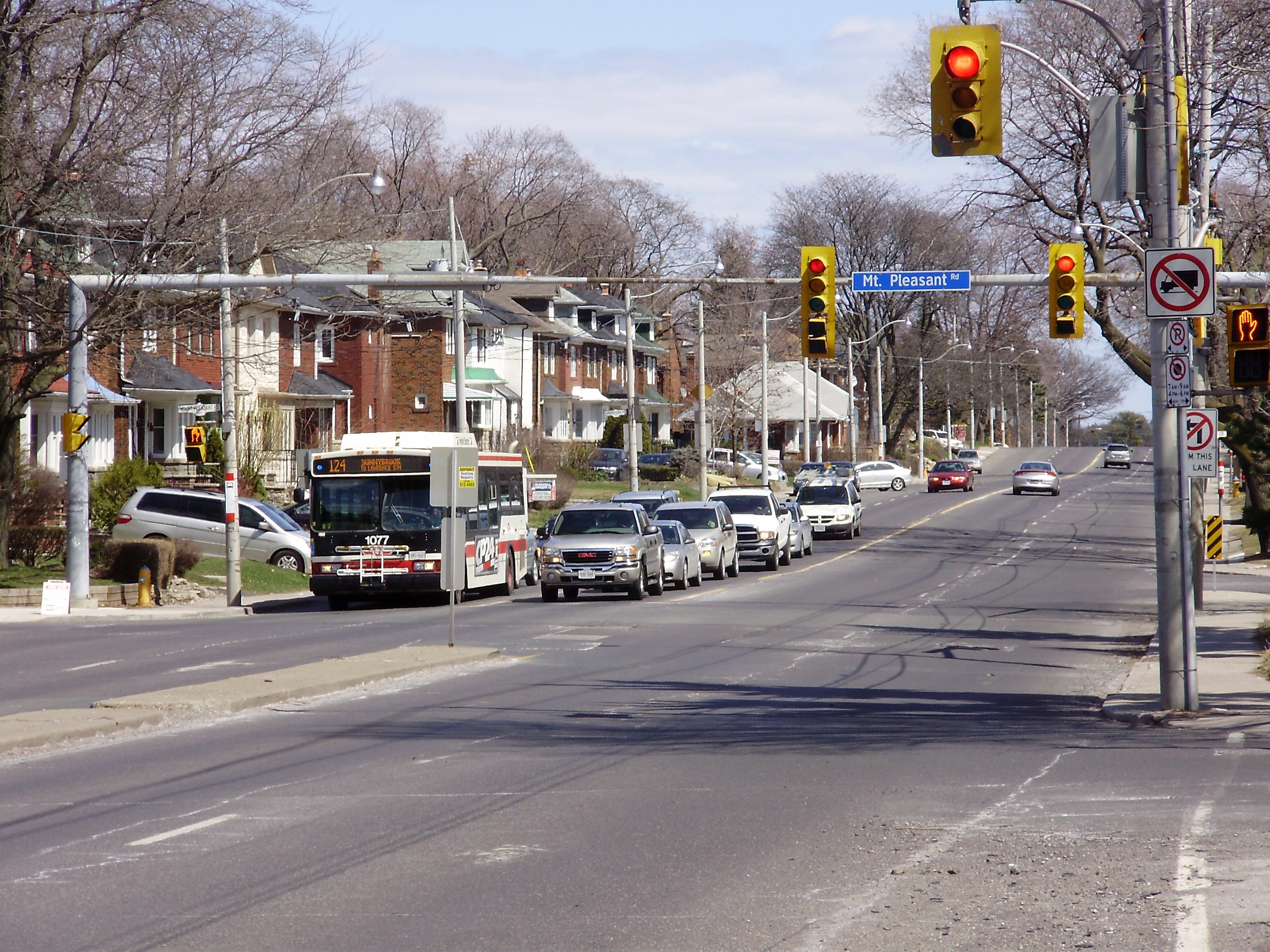
Lawrence Avenue East and Mt. Pleasant Road

Lawrence Avenue is named after the Lawrence family, who immigrated from Yorkshire in 1829 and bought property on the east side of Yonge Street north of the Fourth Concession Road. Peter Lawrence, who served as Justice of the Peace for the village of Eglinton beginning in 1836, purchased the farm. Jacob Lawrence established a mill at Bayview Avenue in 1845. The property was sold in 1907 to Wilfred Dinnick, who developed a garden suburb that he named Lawrence Park in honour of the family. The road remained a sod road until the 1920s before being developed as part of the development.

Lawrence Avenue begins in the west at Royal York Road. West of there, the road continues as The Westway, a windy collector road that ends at Martin Grove Road constructed post-World War II to serve the growing Willowridge-Martingrove-Richview to the south and the Kingsview Village to the north. In the east, it was the survey baseline or first concession road from Victoria Park Avenue east to the end near the Rouge River, east of Port Union.

Lawrence Avenue East is interrupted at Bayview Avenue, by the west branch of the Don River and by York University's Glendon Campus. A detour north on Bayview leads to Post Road, and a connection back to Lawrence Avenue on the east side of the valley. This detour runs through The Bridle Path, one of Toronto's most affluent neighbourhoods. East of Leslie Street, Lawrence becomes an arterial road, passing through Don Mills. In the East Don Valley is the Lawrence Avenue exit of the Don Valley Parkway. From there, Lawrence Avenue continues as a six-lane road through most of Scarborough, with many strip malls flanking its sides. The segment east of Morningside Avenue is primarily residential. The road ends at Rouge Hills Drive at the entrance to Rouge Park near the mouth of the Rouge River.

=== Dixon Road ===
Dixon Road
- Location: Highway 427 – east of Royal York Road (continues south as Scarlett Road northwest as Airport Road into Mississauga)

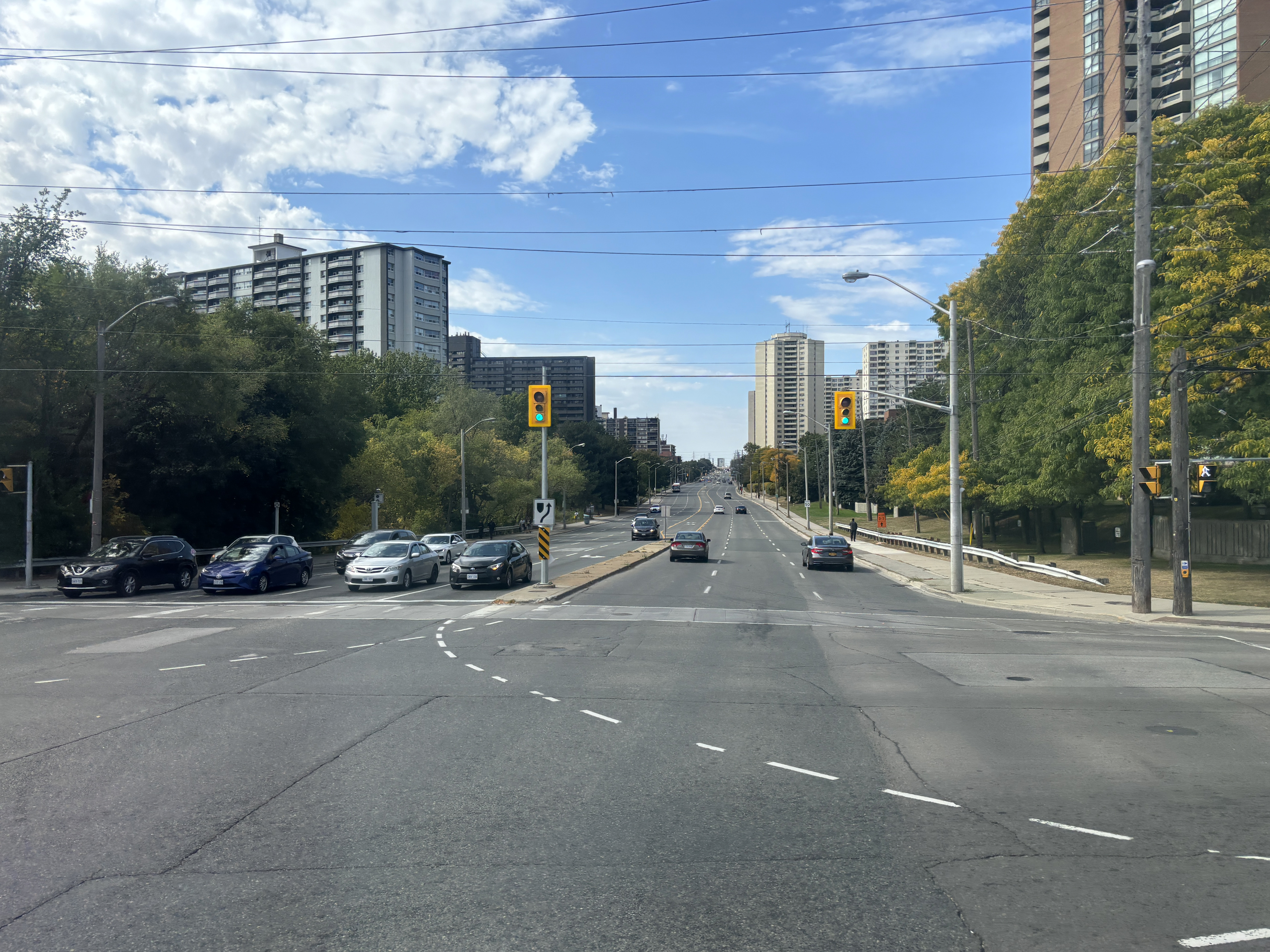
Dixon Road at Islington Avenue

Dixon Road was named after the Dixon family and was previously named Malton Road. George and Thomas Dixon constructed sawmills on their properties abutting the road in 1818 and 1823, respectively. Dixon Road begins as a westward continuation of Scarlett Road at its northern terminus and travels west to Highway 427, where it ends by defaulting into Airport Road (named after Toronto Pearson International Airport, located on the west side of the highway), after crossing into Mississauga, which itself continues northwest through Peel Region to the boundary of Simcoe County. The stretch between Highway 427 and Martin Grove Road is often referred to as the "Airport Strip", due to the large numbers of hotels serving the airport.

=== Orfus Road ===
Orfus Road
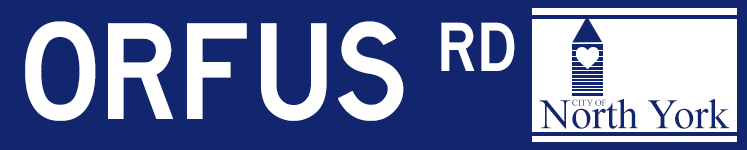
- Location: Caledonia Road – Dufferin Street

Orfus Road is in the Yorkdale neighbourhood and runs between Caledonia Road and Dufferin Street. It mainly consists of outlet stores (mostly fashion), the Yorkdale Adult Day School and the Rinx entertainment complex.

=== Ellesmere Road ===
Ellesmere Road
- Location: Victoria Park Avenue – Kingston Road (continues west as Parkwoods Village Drive, connecting in turn at its west end to York Mills Road)

Ellesmere Road is named after the village (founded as post office in 1853) that once occupied its intersection with Kennedy Road, which was itself named after the birthplace of the original settlers in Shropshire, England. The road travels through Scarborough, where it was laid as the first concession road (Lawrence Avenue being the baseline in the survey of Scarborough). The surrounding land alternates between single-unit homes and commercial strips, along with industrial parks, throughout its length. The road is also referred to as 2nd Concession Road based on the original survey of the old Township of Scarborough. The street terminates at Kingston Road with one section turning southeast and the other at a dead end stub to the west of Highway 401.

=== Wilson Avenue ===
Wilson Avenue
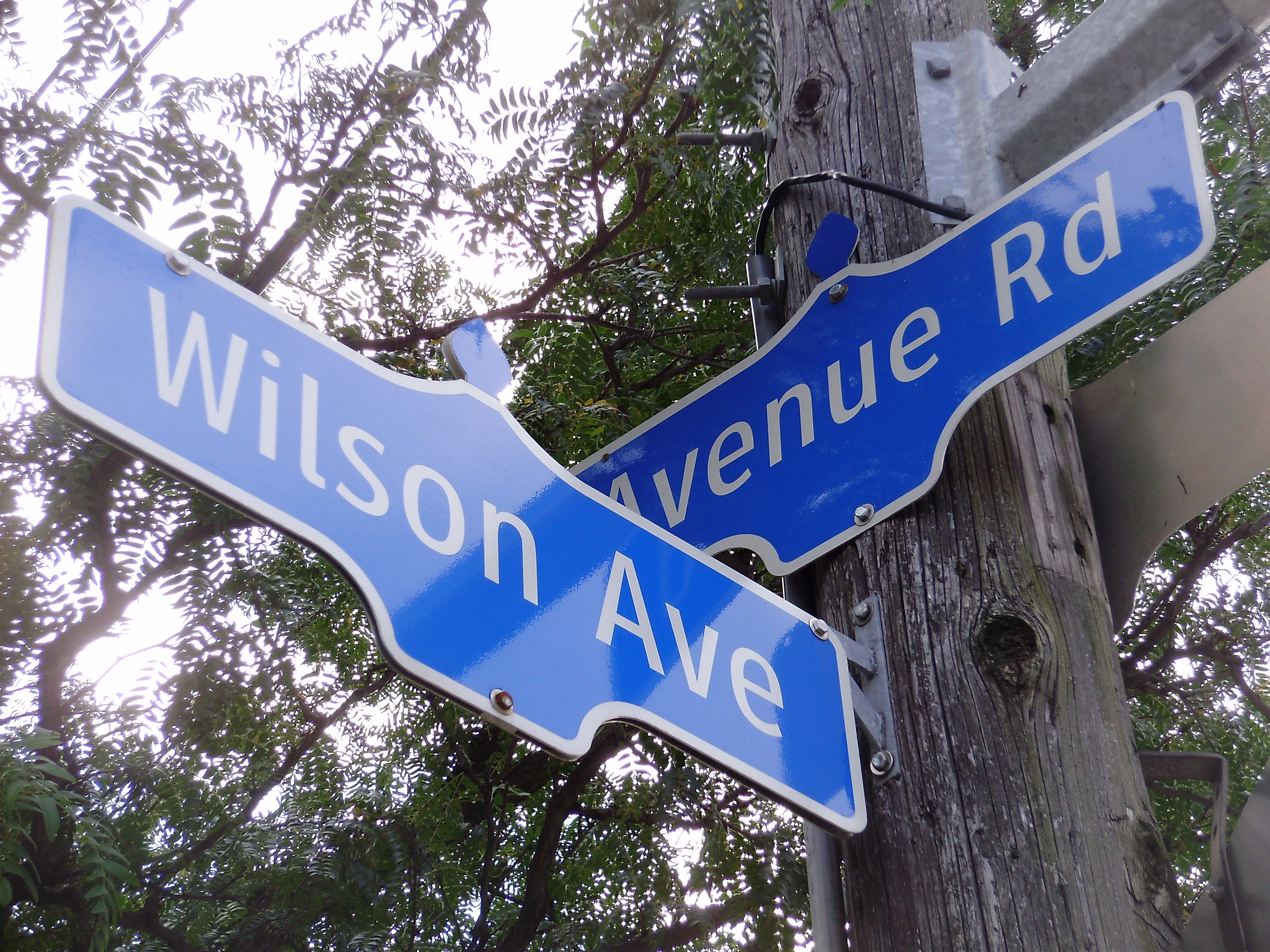
- Location: Weston Road – Yonge Street (continues east as York Mills Road west as Albion Road)

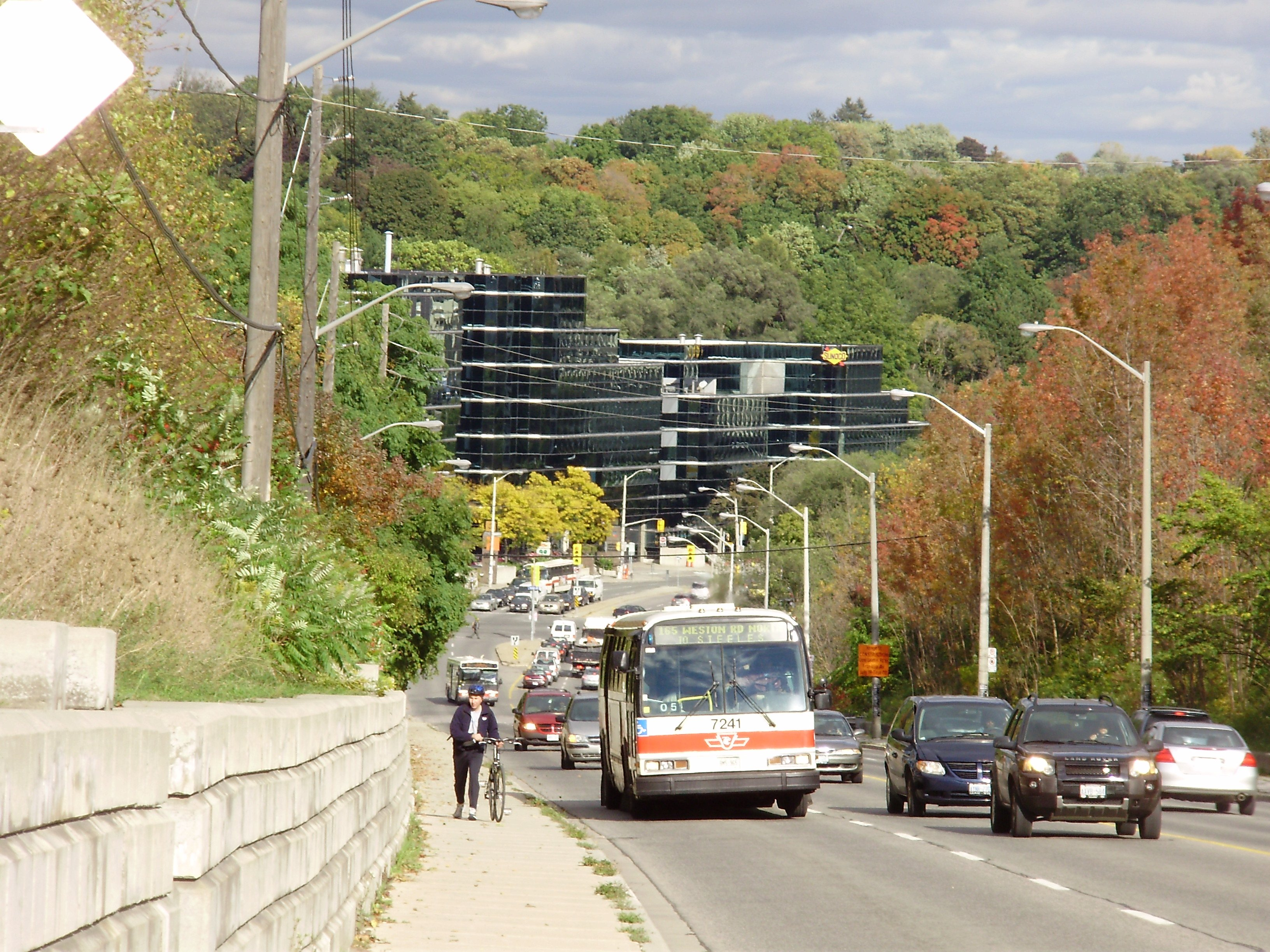
Looking east on Wilson Avenue towards Yonge Street

Wilson Avenue is the western continuation of York Mills Road west of Yonge. Before 1973 the two streets did not meet with Wilson ending further west at Yonge Boulevard. From Yonge Boulevard Wilson travels west becoming Walsh Avenue near Kelvin Avenue just east of Weston Road and then continues northwesterly as Albion Road. A short stub at Kelvin Avenue continues west and ends at just west of Nubana Avenue once ending at Weston Road in a former residential area that disappeared in the 1970s when the off ramps for the Highway 401 at Weston Road was rebuilt.

According to historian Mike Filey, Wilson Avenue is a misspelling of Arthur L. Willson, who was a clerk and treasurer of York Township for over twelve years around 1875. Among Arthur Willson's accomplishments were writing a "municipal manual", "which has been found of practical value as a guide to those requiring a knowledge of municipal law", according to a history of the County of York.

=== York Mills Road ===
York Mills Road
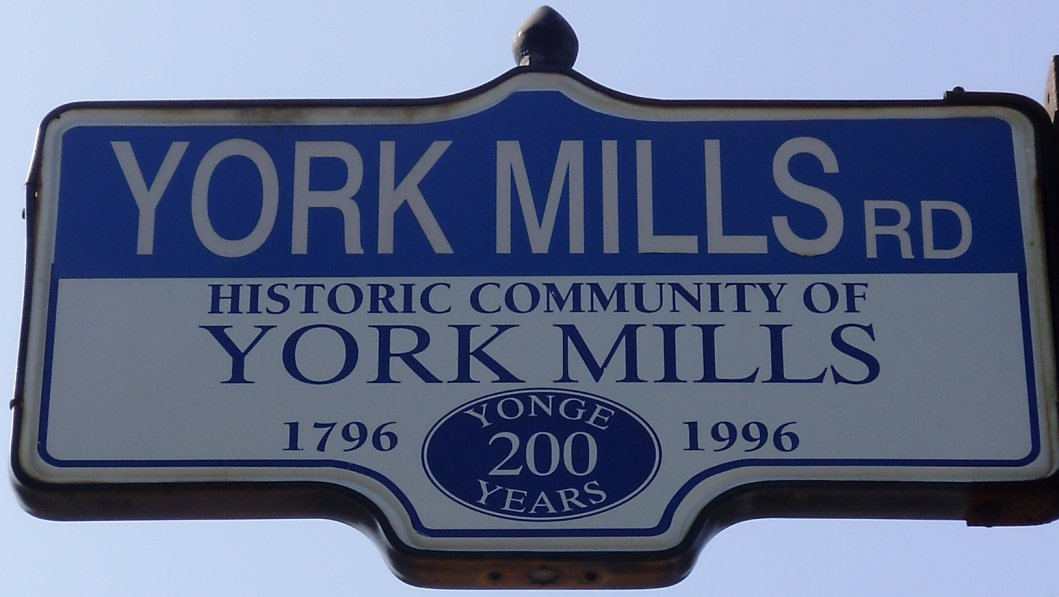
- Location: Yonge Street – Victoria Park Avenue (continues west as Wilson Avenue)

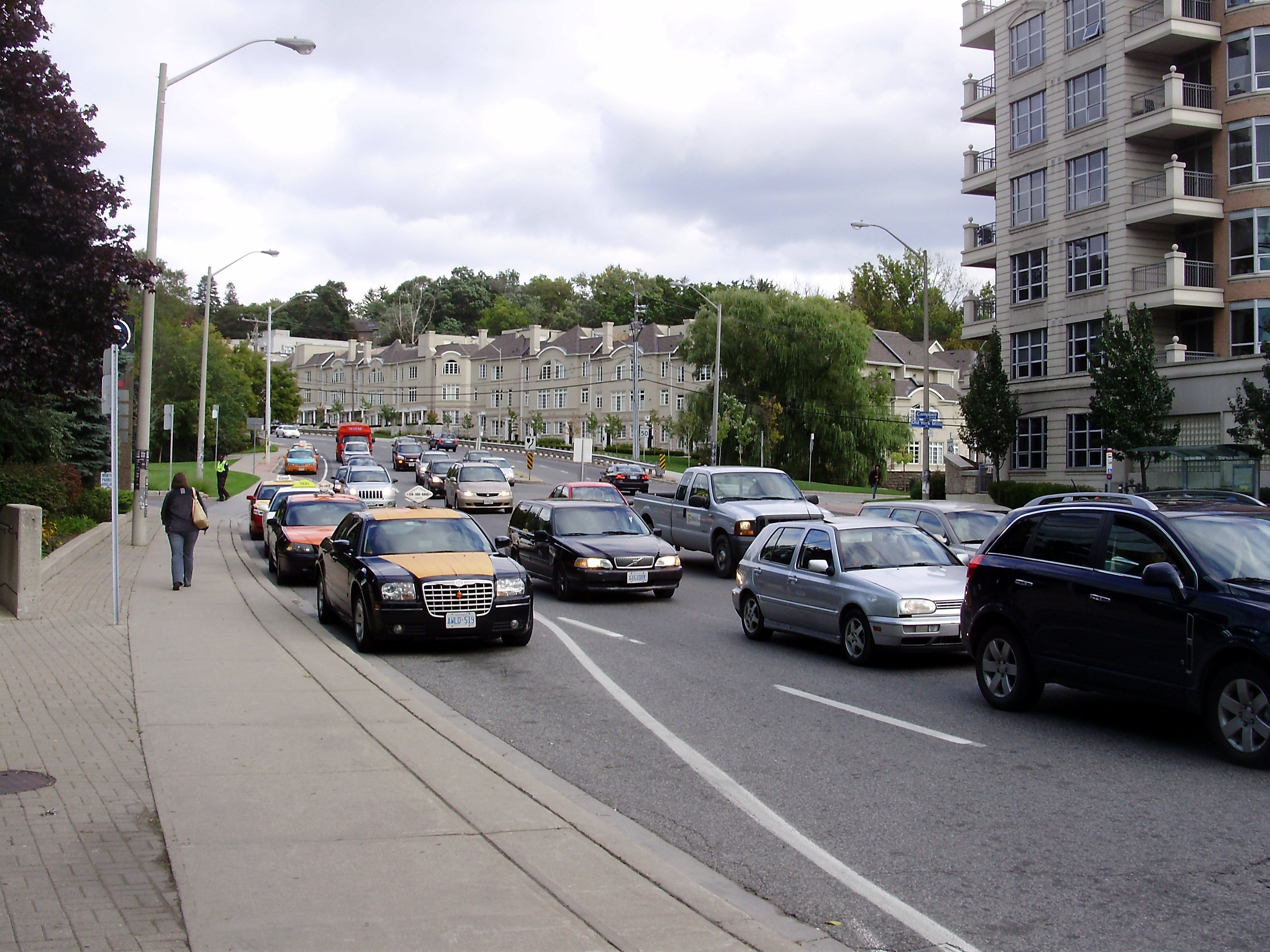
Looking east on York Mills Road from Yonge Street

York Mills Road meets Yonge Street, the road to York, in Hoggs Hollow. Between 1804 and 1926, many mills flourished in this valley, lending to both the name of the road and neighbourhood. York Mills is an eastward continuation of Wilson Avenue; this continuity did not exist until the opening of the Yonge Subway extension in 1973. It is primarily residential in nature, except near Yonge Street and between Leslie Street and Don Mills Road, which are mostly commercial. The road ends at Victoria Park Avenue; a connection to Ellesmere Road is provided via Parkwoods Village Drive, which redirects traffic as it passes Parkway Village Plaza and south of the remaining section of York Mills Road.

=== Sheppard Avenue ===
Sheppard Avenue
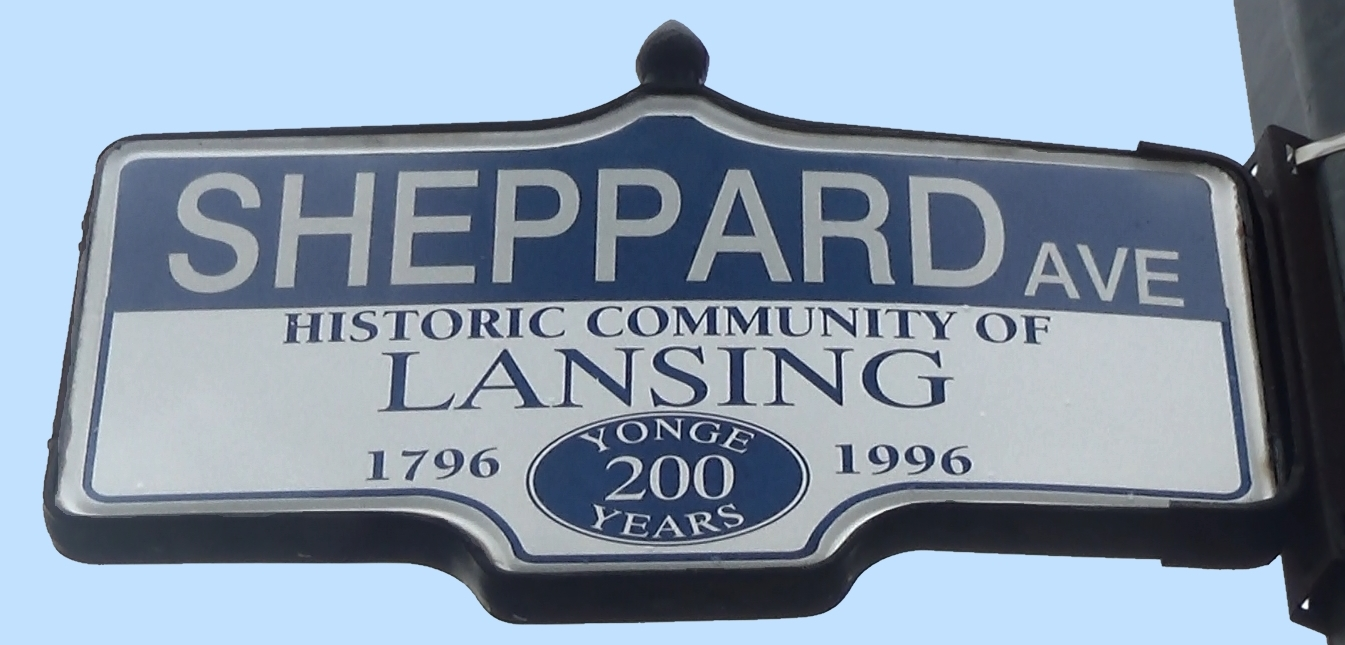
- Location: Weston Road – Kingston Road (continues south of Kingston Road as Port Union Road)

Sheppard Avenue, originally the Lansing Sideroad (after the historic hamlet located at the street's intersection with Yonge Street), is named after one of two families that lived adjacent to its intersection with Yonge Street. Tom Shepherd (or Sheppard) opened the Golden Lion Hotel on the southwest corner of the intersection in 1824 and sold it to his son, Charles, in 1856. On the opposing corner, an unrelated pioneer settler named Joseph Shepard built a log cabin in 1802. Joseph and various members of kin played pivotal roles in the establishment of York.

Sheppard Avenue begins at Weston Road, and travels east across North York and Scarborough (as Scarborough's Third Concession Road) to Meadowvale Road. Shortly thereafter, it turns southeast and ends at Kingston Road, where it becomes Port Union Road. Twyn Rivers Drive continues along the main alignment (as the street's original course), twisting as it descends into the steep valley of the Rouge River into Pickering, where it becomes Sheppard Ave. again at Altona Road, effectively making Sheppard a branched road.

=== Finch Avenue ===
Finch Avenue
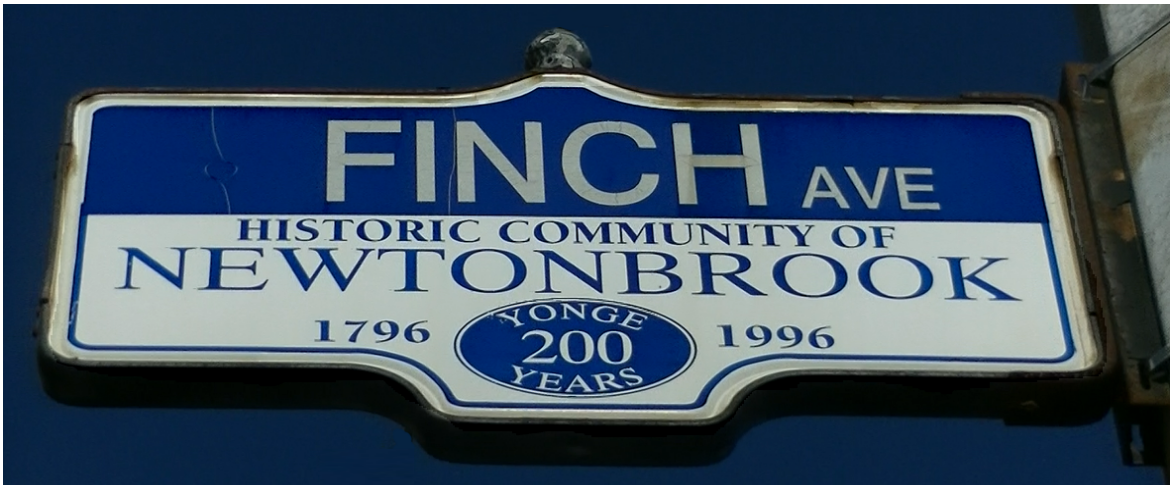
- Location: Highway 427 – Morningside Avenue (a small section continues east of Beare Road to Pickering)

Finch Avenue is named after John Finch, who purchased the Bird-in-the-Hand Inn in 1847. It is residential for most of its length, although portions in North York and Scarborough (as Scarborough's Fourth Concession Road) are heavily industrialized.

In the east, within Malvern, Finch Avenue becomes Morningside Avenue. However, Old Finch Avenue continues along the same right-of-way passing north of the Toronto Zoo and ending at Meadowvale Road. Approximately 800 m (0.50 mi) to the east, another section of Finch Avenue begins and passes into Pickering.

In the west, Finch Avenue continues past Wet'n'Wild Toronto (formerly Wild Water Kingdom) to Steeles Avenue in Brampton.

Finch Avenue developed three sinkholes during the 2000s: one in 2005 during the Toronto Supercell between the Tobermory stop and the Sentinel stop on the then-future Line 6 Finch West and two in 2009.

Two subway stations are on Finch Avenue: Finch station at Yonge Street and Finch West station at Keele Street.

An LRT line running along the street west of Finch West station, Line 6 Finch West, opened on December 7, 2025.

=== Cummer Avenue ===
Cummer Avenue
- Location: Yonge Street – Leslie Street (continues east as McNicoll Avenue west as Drewry Avenue)

Cummer Avenue is named after Jacob Kummer, a German settler who immigrated to Upper Canada in 1797 and built a mill on the Don River in 1819. The road to this mill became associated with the anglicized variation of the family name. The road travels east from Yonge as a continuation of Drewry Avenue (which begins at Bathurst Street). At its crossing of the Don River, Cummer curves north, returns to the east and ends at Leslie Street. East of Leslie Street, the road continues as McNicoll Avenue before ending at Morningside Avenue in Scarborough. East of Morningside Avenue, the road runs as Oasis Boulevard, before curving northwards to serve the Morningside Heights neighbourhood in northeastern Scarborough.

=== Steeles Avenue ===
Steeles Avenue
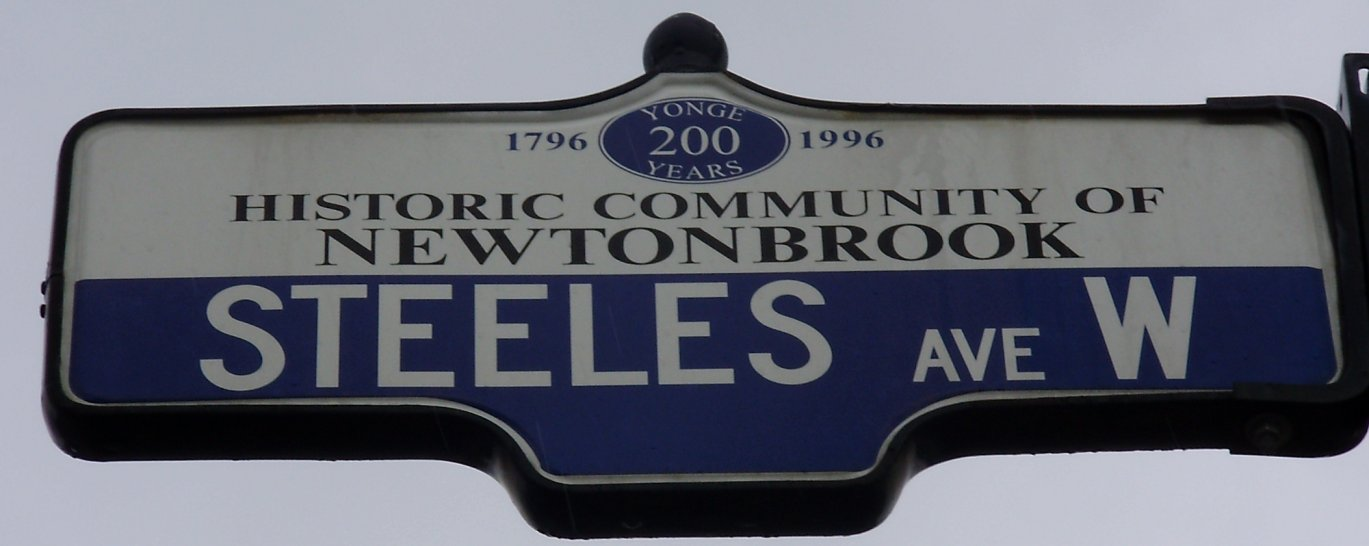
- Location: Albion Road – Scarborough–Pickering Townline (continues west into Brampton and becomes Taunton Road in Pickering)

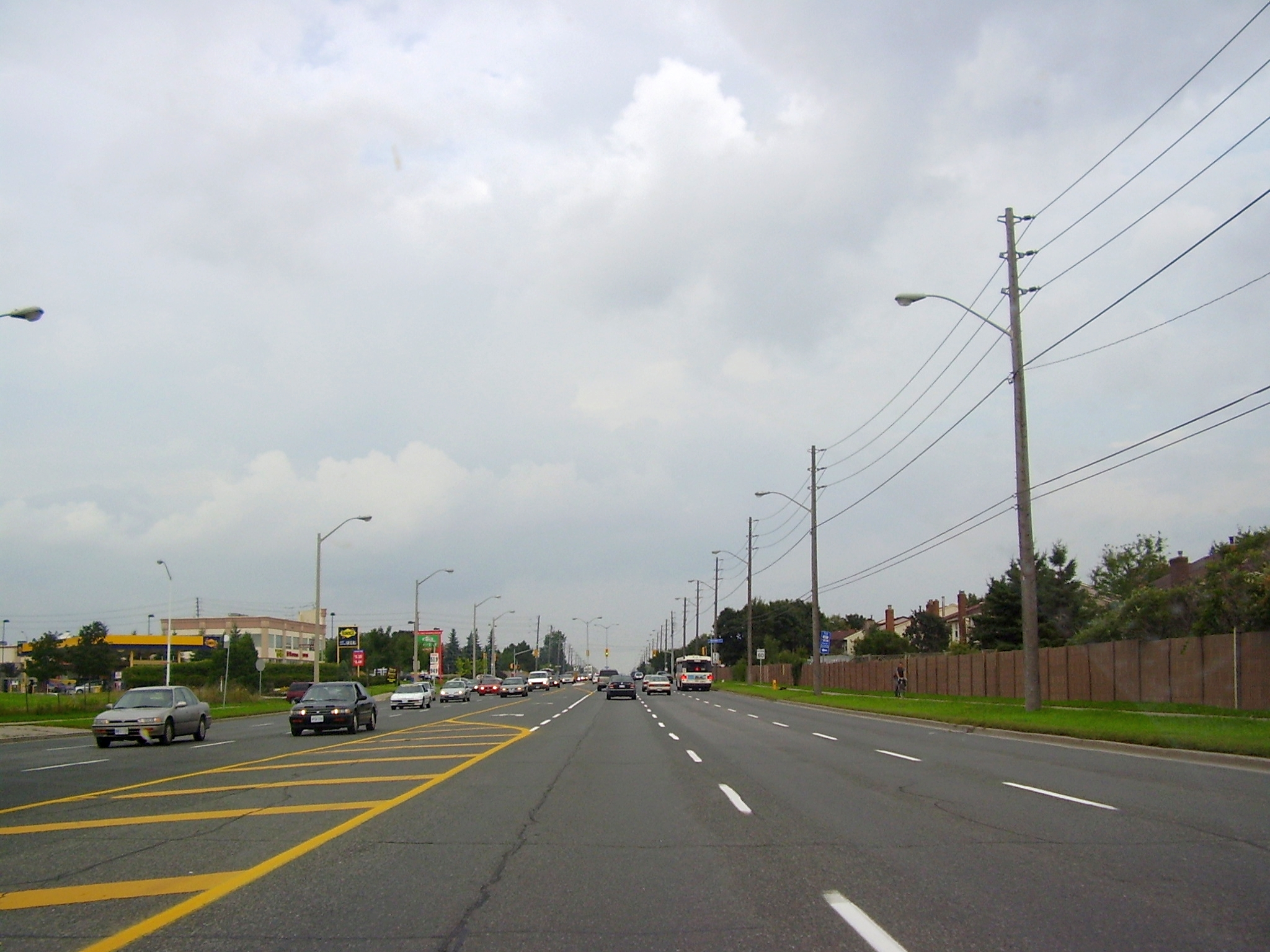
Steeles Avenue, near its intersection with Warden Avenue

Steeles Avenue is a major arterial road in the north end of the city that marks the boundary between Toronto and York Region to the north, though the road itself is maintained by The City of Toronto. It is the only road (aside from Highway 401) to pass uninterrupted, west to east through the full width of the city; it also continues west to Milton (after traversing Brampton) and becomes Taunton Road in Pickering. The Scarborough section was also once referred as Scarborough Townline. The street is named after Thomas Steele, who resided at what is today Yonge and Steeles beginning in 1856. Later, he purchased the Green Bush Inn and renamed it the Steeles Hotel.

== See also ==
- Lists of roads in Toronto
  - List of north–south roads in Toronto
  - List of contour roads in Toronto
  - List of notable streets in Toronto
- Royal eponyms in Canada
