= Royal York =

Royal York may refer to:

== Hotels ==
- The Milner York, York, England, once known as The Royal York Hotel
- Fairmont Royal York, Toronto, Ontario, Canada

== Transport ==
- Royal York Road, Toronto, Ontario, Canada
- Royal York (TTC) subway station, Toronto, Ontario, Canada
- Royal York, an international night train of the Canadian Pacific Railway and New York Central
