= Humber Valley Village =

- Neighbourhood
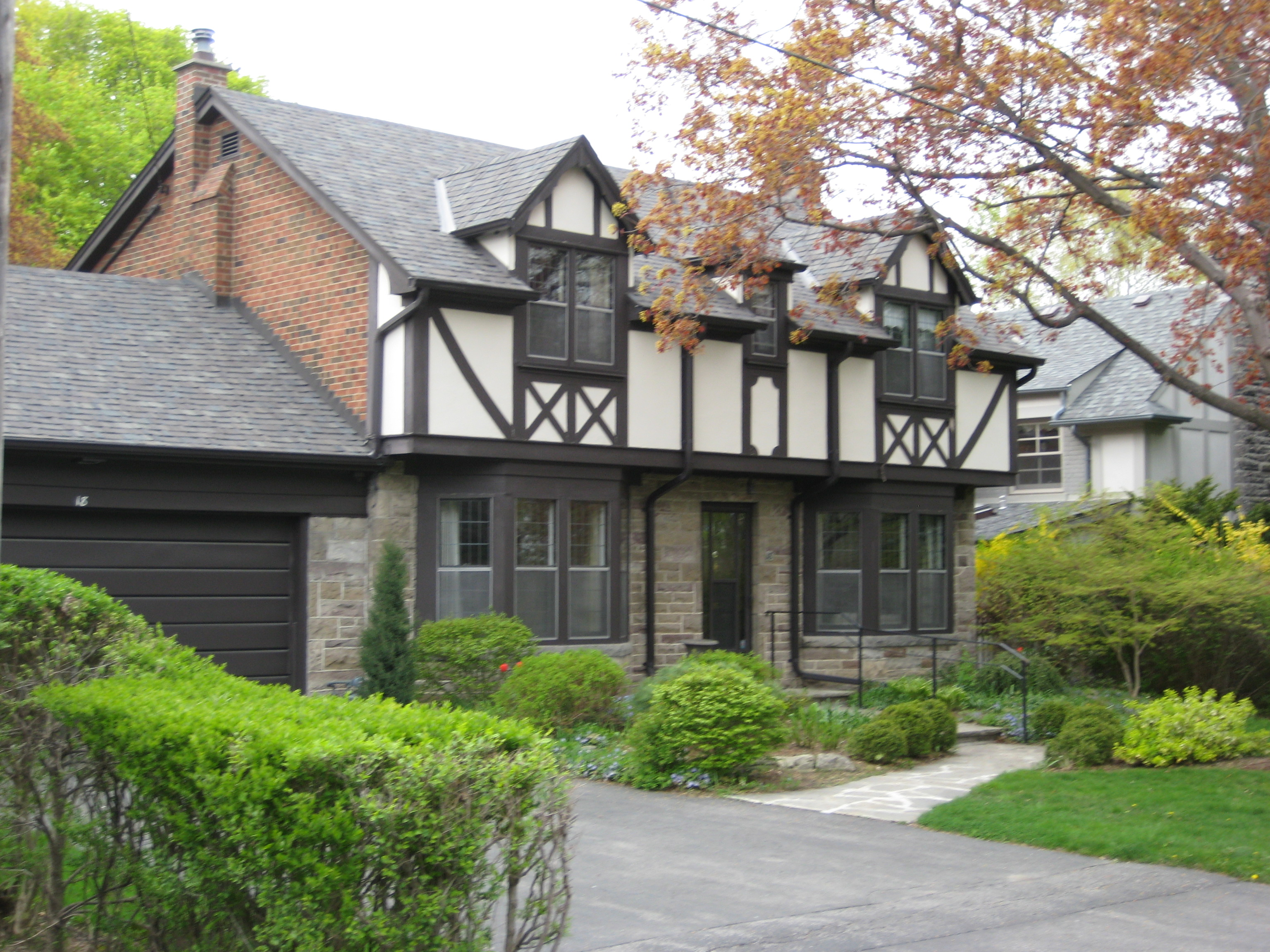

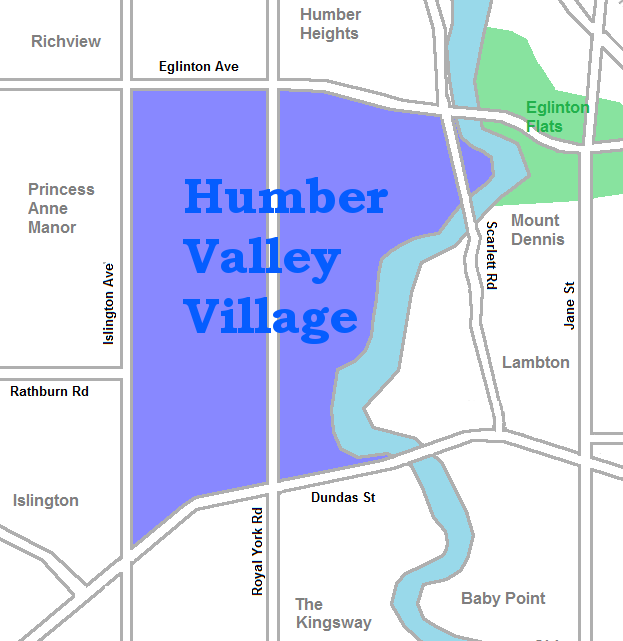
- Coordinates: 43°40′18″N 79°30′52″W
- Country: Canada
- Province: Ontario
- City: Toronto
- Established: 1850 Etobicoke Township
- Changed municipality: 1998 Toronto from City of Etobicoke

Government
  - MP: Yvan Baker (Etobicoke Centre)
  - MPP: Kinga Surma (Etobicoke Centre)
  - Councillor: Stephen Holyday (Ward 2)

Humber Valley Village is a neighbourhood located in Toronto, Ontario, Canada. It is within the former suburb of Etobicoke and includes some of the most expensive real estate in the metropolitan west end. The boundaries are from Dundas Street on the south to Islington Avenue to the west, Eglinton Avenue to the north, and the Humber River in the east. The neighbourhood is in the political riding of Etobicoke Centre.

== Character ==
This neighbourhood can be further broken down into smaller communities. The triangular quadrant north of Dundas from Islington to Royal York, but south of Reigate is known as Chestnut Hills. The area surrounding Edenbridge, on the west side of Royal York is known as Lincoln Woods. The northern corner of Islington and Eglinton is sometimes referred to as The Greens of St. George's. Sometimes streets in the neighbourhood become their own little community as well, for example people tend to connect to names like Valecrest, North Dr, Wimbleton, all of which are streets in this neighbourhood.

This neighbourhood is the wealthiest part of Etobicoke, and considered at par with the exclusive neighbourhoods that developed along Avenue Rd, and Yonge St, between Bloor and Highway 401. This wealth is evident in the schools. Catchment areas for schools such as Lambton-Kingsway, Humber Valley Village, Our Lady of Sorrows Elementary School, Etobicoke Collegiate Institute, and Richview Collegiate Institute are very defined. In some cases, those who do not live in the boundaries must apply with a lottery system to gain acceptance. There is also an independent elementary school, Kingsway College School, in the area, located on Dundas St.

Residents of Humber Valley Village self-organize and fundraise through the Humber Valley Village Residents' Association (HVVRA), which has a history of launching development challenges to the Ontario Municipal Board (OMB). Most notably, HVVRA ran a sustained public relations, legal and lobbying effort that resulted in a number of planning concessions by First Capital Realty (FCR) regarding a proposal for Humbertown Plaza.

== History ==
Although laid-out in farm lots by 1805, most of the lots were purchased by some of Etobicoke's early land owners who lived elsewhere in the township leaving this part of the Humber Valley little developed with no homes along what became Royal York Road from Dundas north to Eglinton. The Iroquois shoreline, remnant of the ancient Lake Iroquois, which forms an escarpment along Dundas in Etobicoke, turns far to the north in this area, cut away by the Humber River creating the Humber Valley.

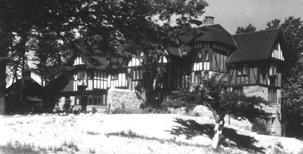
Robert Home Smith's estate at Edenbridge and Edenbrook, 1930

The western extension of St. Clair Avenue (now called Rathburn in Etobicoke) ran through the centre of the area and it was near this point the local developer Robert Home Smith built his home 'Edenbridge' (named after a village in southern England) overlooking the Humber Valley, at the turn of the century, after purchasing much of the surrounding land. To the east of Royal York another early resident, Frederick James, in 1908 developed his 'Red Gables' estate as a large landscaped park which, as the 'James Garden' landscaped park, remains today. While Robert Home Smith developed land in The Kingsway neighbourhood to the south, the new 'Edenbridge' area was resurveyed and subdivided for development by Smith's company more slowly as the 'Humber Valley Surveys'; construction starting in the mid 1930s and continuing after Smith's death in 1935, until the 1960s. This 30-year span produced many different styles of home as fashions changed, leading to a very different style of development than originally envisioned by Robert Home Smith. The designs include: Georgian, Colonial, Tudor, English Cottage, Cape Cod, ranch bungalows, split-level, contemporary and modernist.

=== Later development ===
The neighbourhood was planned as a wealthy suburb like 'the Kingsway' to the south, which it has largely remained despite the later development of many apartments immediately to the west along an extended 'the Kingsway', north of Dundas to the west of Edenbridge, during Etobicoke's rapid urbanisation in the 1960s. The extension of St. Clair Avenue (Rathburn in Etobicoke) was redeveloped, in a similar style to the area in the west, as Anglesey; a winding street lined with apartments. Because Robert Home Smith had planned the, then slowly growing, area as a purely residential development, there are few institutions here. Rapid growth in Edenbridge and the higher density (north) Kingsway area to the west, necessitated the establishment of the Humber Valley Village public school, built in 1951, soon followed by the Humbertown Shopping Centre at Royal York and Dundas at the heart of 'Humber Valley Village'. The 1950s also saw the redevelopment of the Royal York and Dundas intersection as a highway style interchange, thought to be necessitated by urbanisation but now much criticised, which divided this neighbourhood from the older neighbourhoods to the south. Still mostly an exclusive and leafy neighbourhood, some recent high-density development is taking place along the short commercial stretch of Royal York in the south of the community across from the Humbertown Shopping Centre, such as the 'James Club' condominium, named after James Gardens.

== Parks ==
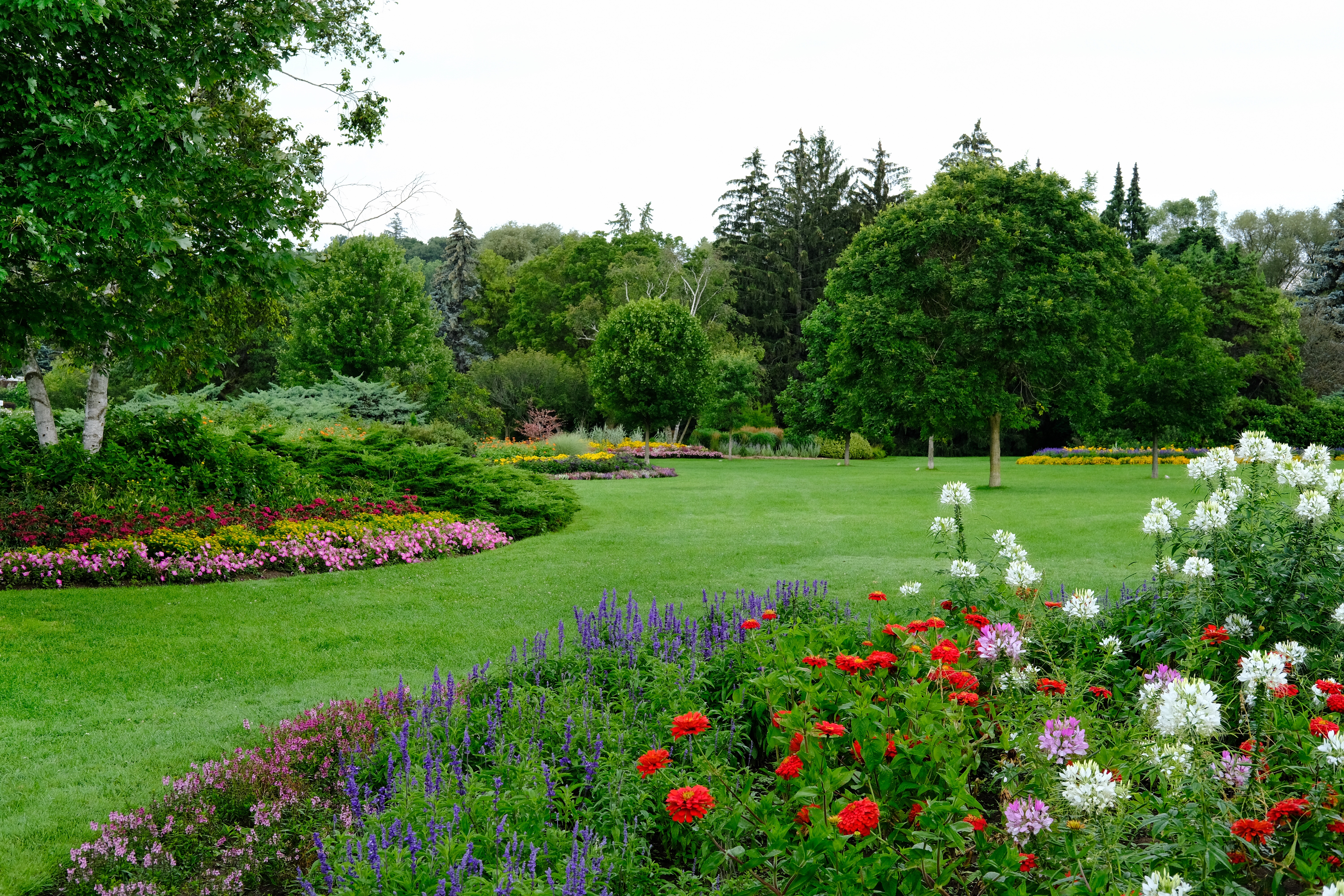
Located in the neighbourhood, James Garden is a botanical garden managed by Toronto Parks, Forestry and Recreation Division.

The defining element of this community is the parks system. There five golf courses within one kilometre of every side of the borders and large networks of green space surround the Humber River. This connects to the Martin Goodman Trail, which follows Lake Ontario. Lambton Woods Park is located south of the city-owned Scarlet Woods Golf Course (c. 1974) along the western banks of the Humber. James Gardens is a botanical garden located north of Lambton Woods Park, and is managed by Toronto Parks, Forestry and Recreation Division. Built around Fred James home, the botanical garden was acquired by Metro Toronto in 1955

Other smaller parks include:

- Edenbrook Park
- Cobble Hills Parkette
- Valecrest Park
- Hartfield Court Parkette
- Humber Valley Park
- Wimbleton Road North Parkette
- Chestnut Hills Park
- Humbertown Park
- Eden Valley Park
- Allanhurst Park
- Scarlett Heights Park

== Schools ==
The Toronto District School Board, the city's public school board, operates one elementary school in the neighbourhood, Humber Valley Village Junior Middle School. Located on Hartfield Road, west of Royal York Road, north of Dundas Street, the property lies within the valley of the Humber River. It was established in 1951. In addition to public schools, the neighbourhood is also home to a music school and number of private schools, Kingsley Primary School, Kingsway College School, and Leonardo da Vinci Academy. Leonardo da Vinci Academy is based at the former location for Buttonwood Hills Public School, and leases the property from Toronto Lands.

== Sports ==
The Humber Valley Sharks is a hockey team from the Humber Valley Hockey Association. The Humber Valley Hockey Association - was formed in 1953 by Mr. Stafford Smythe (whose father Conn Smythe was one of hockey's elder statesmen and former President of the Toronto Maple Leafs), Etobicoke Sports Hall of Famer and well known sportscaster Mr. Jack Stafford Jr. and Mr. Ray Picard. One of the league's most notable Alumni, former Member of Parliament and Hockey Hall of Famer Ken Dryden played for one of the league's first two teams at 7 years of age.

== Institutions ==
- Humbertown Shopping Centre - small shopping mall anchored by Loblaws and Shoppers Drug Mart
- St. George's Golf and Country Club Stanley Thompson designed course opened in 1931 as the Royal York Golf Club
- Lambton Mills Cemetery - Jewish cemetery opened in 1909

=== Churches ===
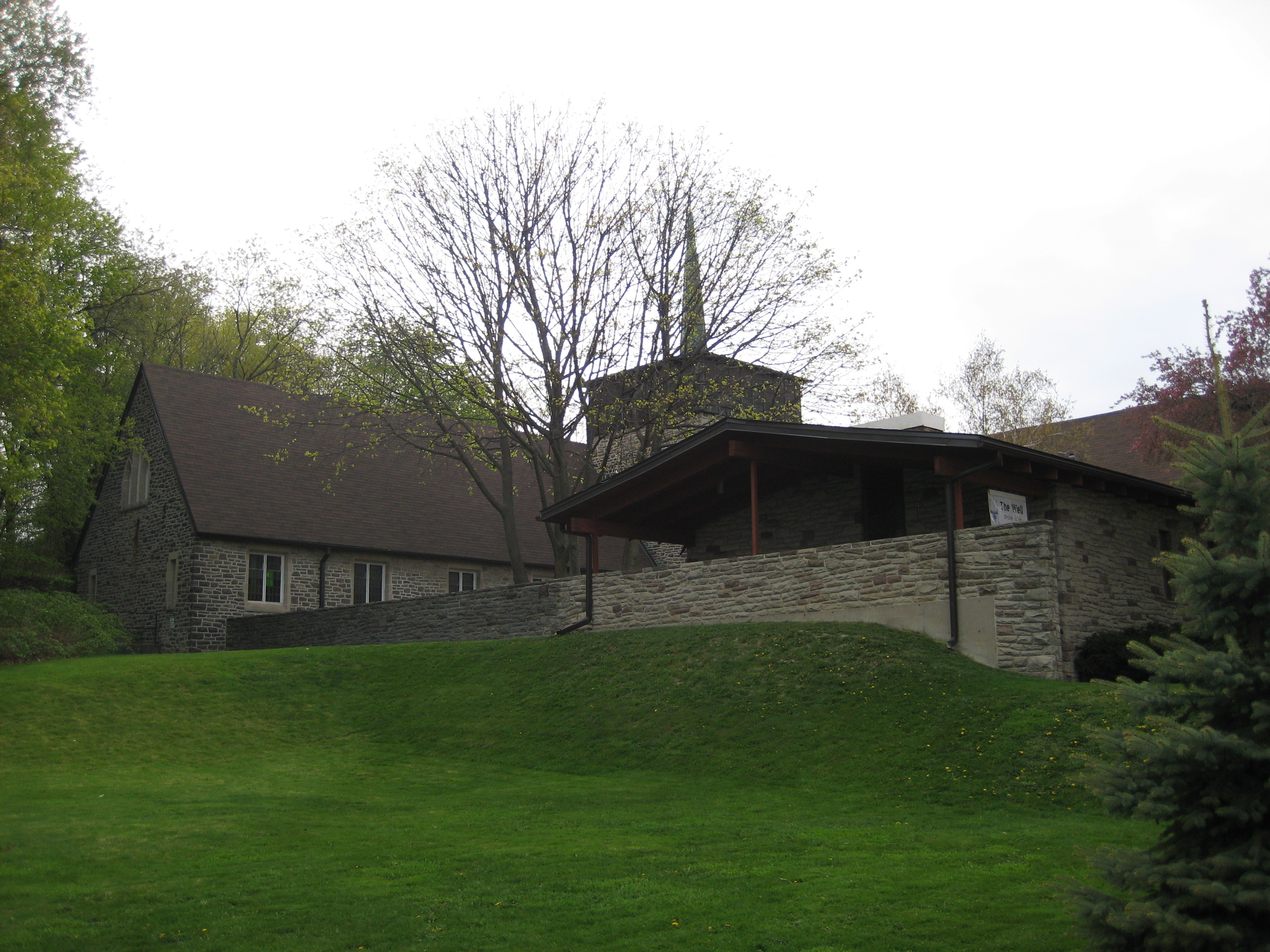
St. Giles Kingsway Presbyterian Church is a church located in Humber Valley Village.

- Humber Valley United Church; built in 1953 with congregation established in 1952
- St Giles Kingsway Presbyterian Church; established 1960 from the merger of St Giles and Kingsway congregations; current building opened in 1962
- St. George's on-the-Hill Anglican Church; established 1844 and consecrated by Bishop John Strachan.

== Transportation ==
The Toronto Transit Commission operates buses along the main arteries of the neighbourhood. These include

- 73 Royal York - Royal York Road
- 37 Islington and 337 Islington Blue Night - Islington Avenue
- 40 Junction-Dundas West - Dundas Street West
- 32 Eglinton West and 332 Eglinton West Night - Eglinton Avenue West
- 48 Rathburn - Anglesey Boulevard

These bus routes connects to Islington, Kipling, Royal York, Dundas West, Cedarvale, and Eglinton subway stations.
