= Richview, Toronto =

Richview
- Neighbourhood
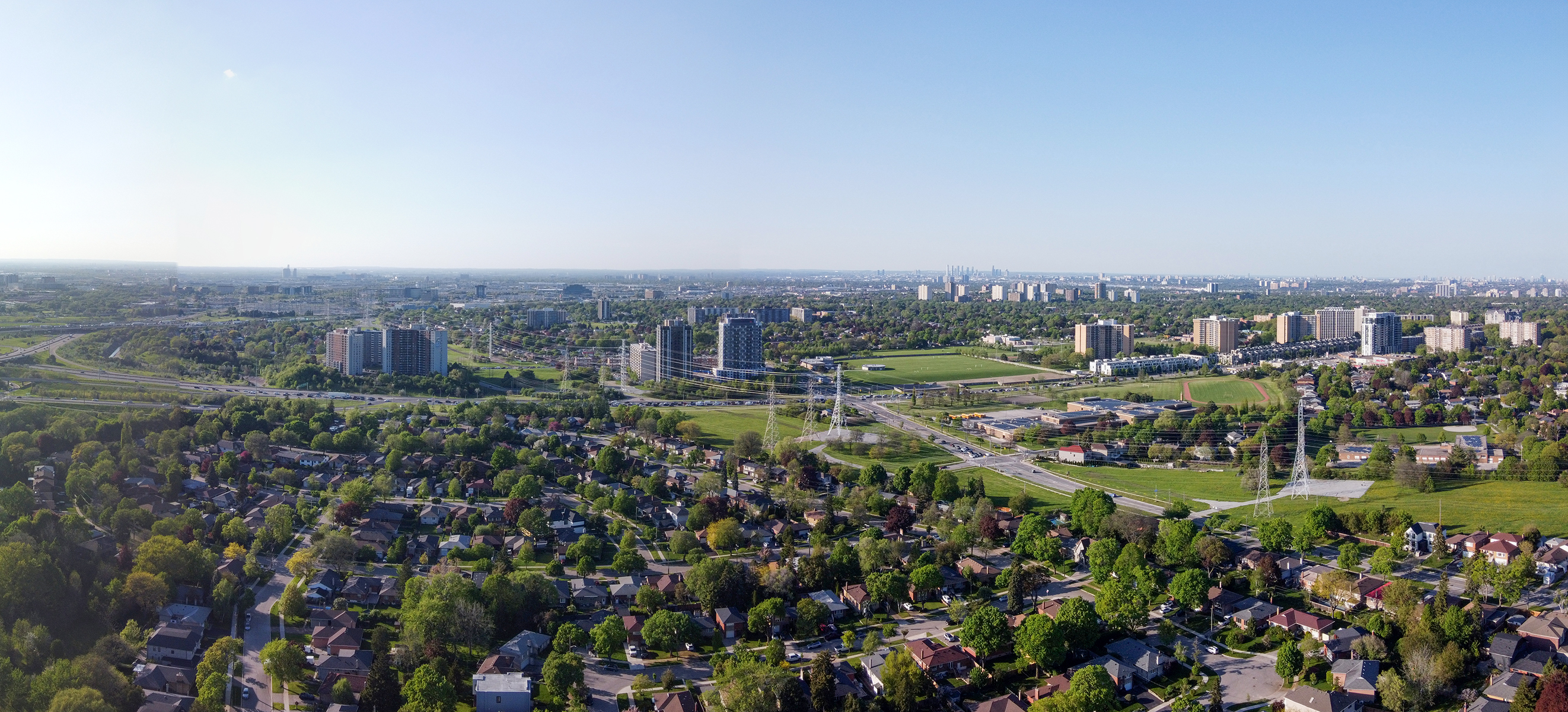
- Aerial view of Richview in 2025

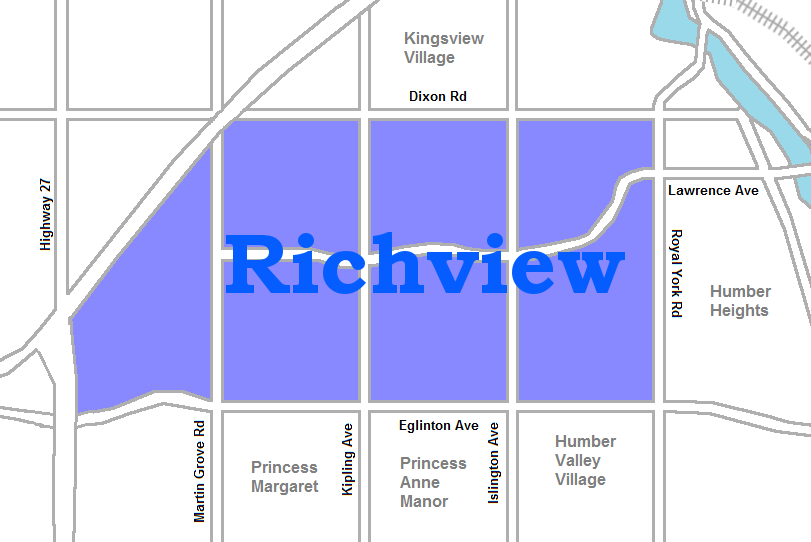
- Coordinates: 43°40′38″N 79°33′03″W
- Country: Canada
- Province: Ontario
- City: Toronto
- Established: 1852 (Postal village)
- Absorbed: 1960s into the urban area of Toronto via urbanisation

Government
  - MP: Yvan Baker (Etobicoke Centre)
  - MPP: Kinga Surma (Etobicoke Centre)
  - Councillor: Stephen Holyday (Ward 2 Etobicoke Centre)

Population (2016)
  - Total: 22,156
  - Density: 4,007/km^{2} (10,380/sq mi)

Richview, formally known as Willowridge-Martingrove-Richview, is a neighbourhood in the city of Toronto, Ontario, Canada. It is bounded on the west by Highway 401 and on the north by the highway and by Dixon Road, Royal York Road on the east, and Eglinton Avenue West along the south. Richview was originally established as a postal village within the then-agricultural Etobicoke Township.

== History ==
One part of the existing neighbourhood predates the suburbanization of the area.

The first settler was William Knaggs, who established his home and farm near Rich view Side road (Eglinton) and red Concession (Highway 427) in 1818. A later settler, Christopher Kit Thirkle, gave the area's earlier name Kit's Corners.

Richview began in 1852, when a post office called "Richview" opened in this area. Richview gave its name to the proposed Richview Expressway.

Richview United Church, built in 1888, was demolished in the 1960s, leaving only its graveyard, now surrounded by development.

== Demographics ==
Major ethnic populations (2016):

- 59.9% White; 19.3% Italian, 11.1% English
- 13.3% Black; 3.5% Jamaican
- 10.6% South Asian
- 6.3% East Indian
- 4.2% Latin American (of any race)

== Education ==
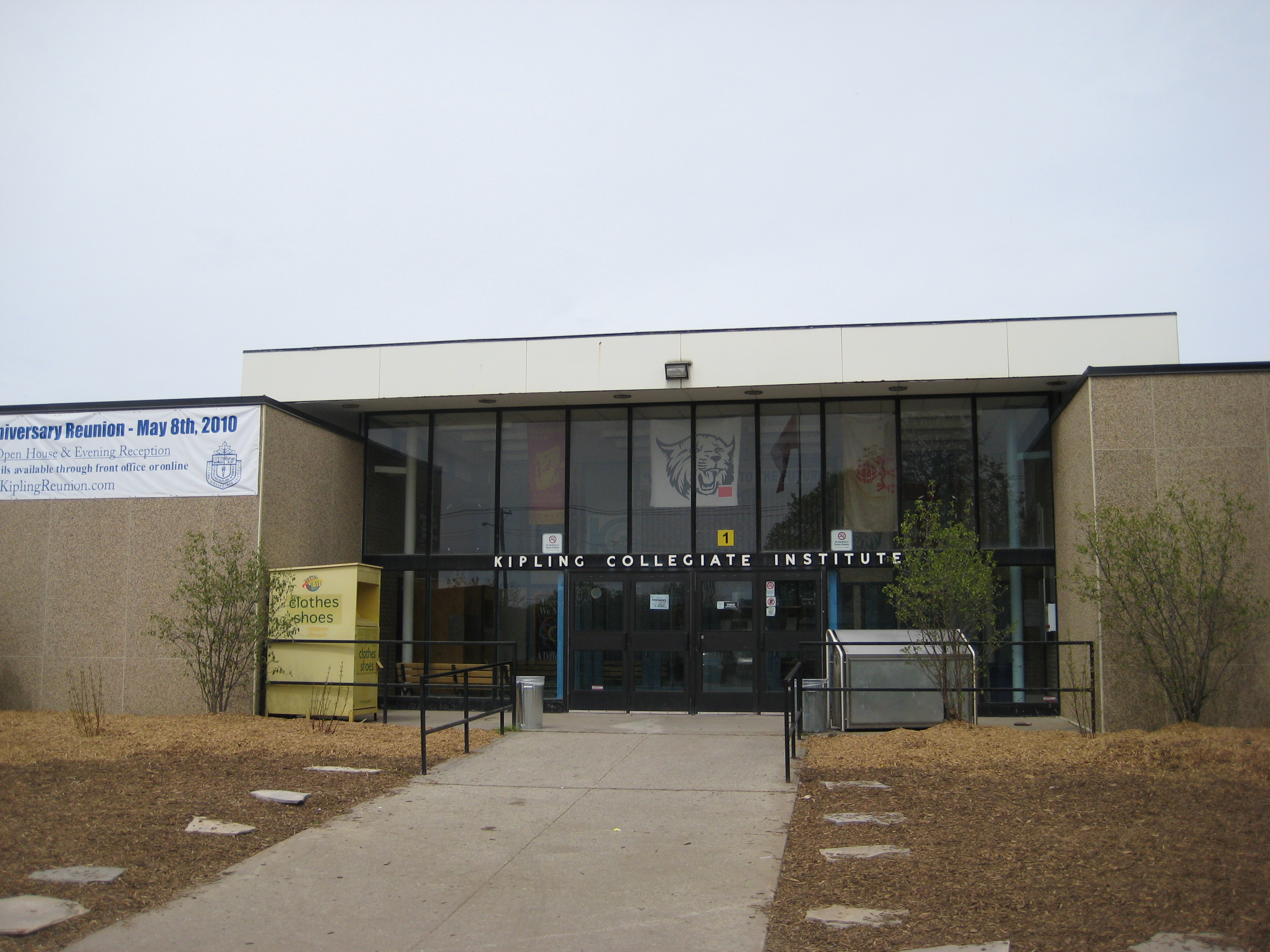
Kipling Collegiate Institute is one of several secondary schools located in Richview.

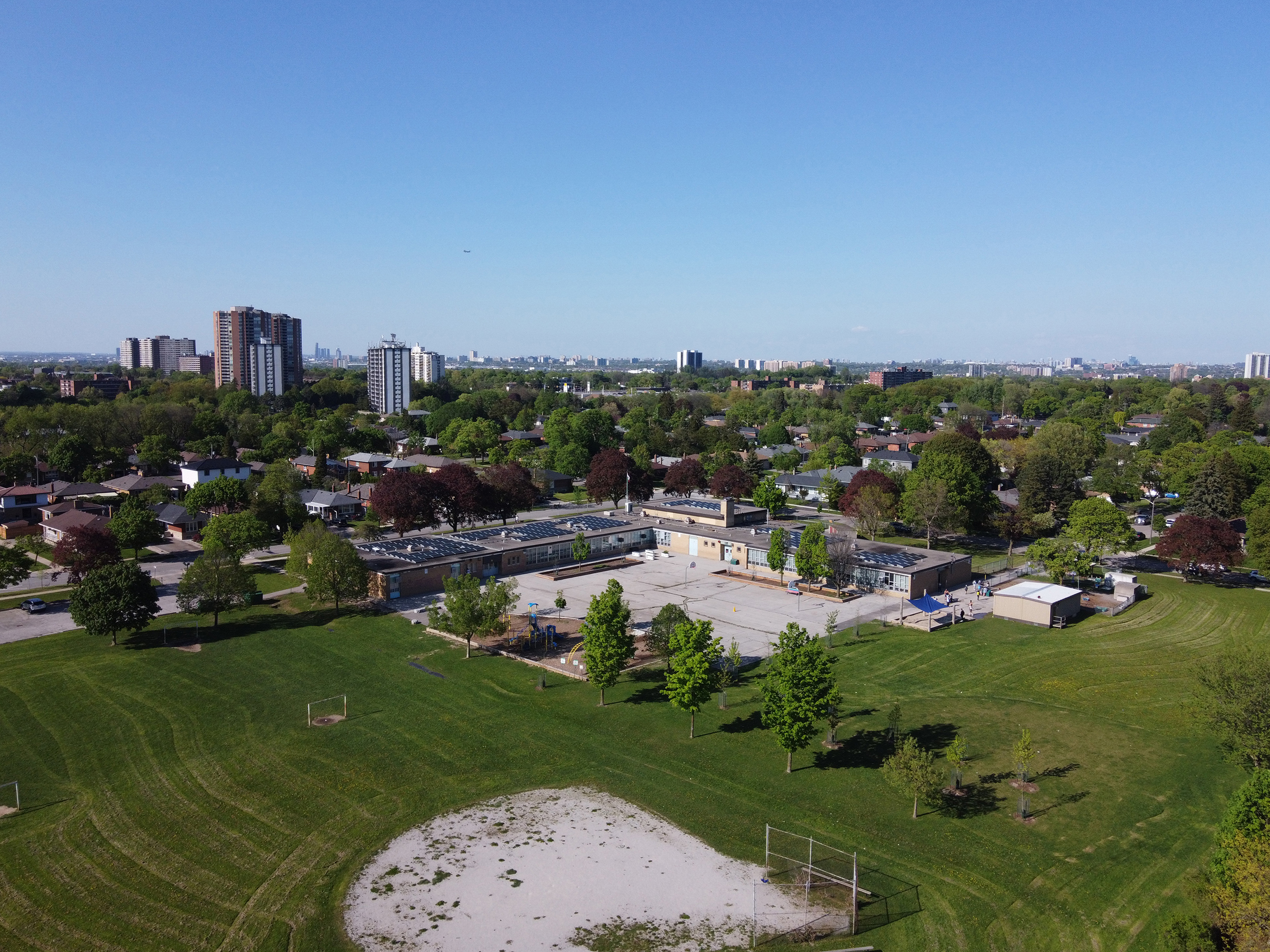
Westway Junior Public School

Four public school boards operate elementary schools in the neighbourhood, Conseil scolaire Viamonde (CSV), Conseil scolaire catholique MonAvenir (CSCM), the Toronto Catholic District School Board (TCDSB), and the Toronto District School Board (TDSB). They include:

- All Saints Catholic School, TCDSB
- Dixon Grove Junior Middle School, TDSB
- École élémentaire catholique Notre-Dame-de-Grâce, CSCM
- École élémentaire Félix-Leclerc, CSV
- Father Serra Catholic School, TCDSB
- Hilltop Middle School, TDSB
- Parkfield Junior School, TDSB
- St. Eugene Catholic School, TCDSB
- St. Marcellus Catholic School, TCDSB
- Transfiguration of Our Lord Catholic School, TCDSB
- Valleyfield Junior School, TDSB
- Westway Junior School, TDSB

The Toronto District School Board is the only school board with secondary schools in the neighbourhood, which include Central Etobicoke High School, Kipling Collegiate Institute, and Scarlett Heights Entrepreneurial Academy. Richview Collegiate Institute a secondary school that bears the name of the neighbourhood, is situated next to the neighbourhood, on the south side of Eglinton Avenue.

== Communities ==
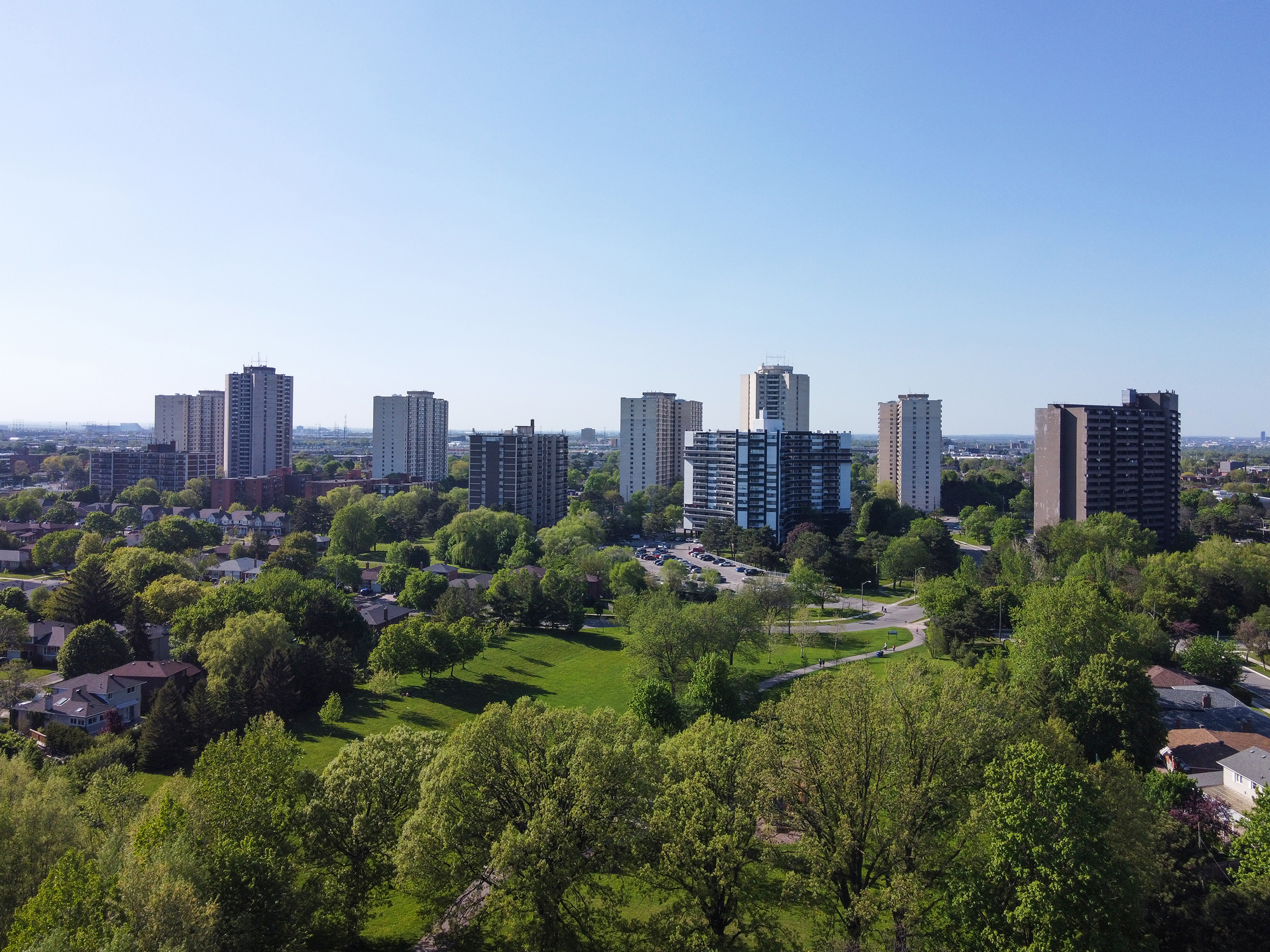
High rise apartments in The Westway

There are several small neighbourhoods within Richview:

- Willowridge covers the triangle at the far west of the neighbourhood west of Martin Grove.
- The Westway, also known as St. Phillip's is a community that covers the northeast portion of Richview, east of Kipling and north of The Westway.
- Martin Grove Gardens is the area bounded by Kipling, The Westway, Martin Grove, and Dixon.
- Richmond Gardens and Royal York Gardens are neighbourhoods in the southeast portion of Richview, south of The Westway and east of Kipling.
- Richmond Park is the area in the south central portion of Richview, south of The Westway and east of Martin Grove.

== Institutions ==
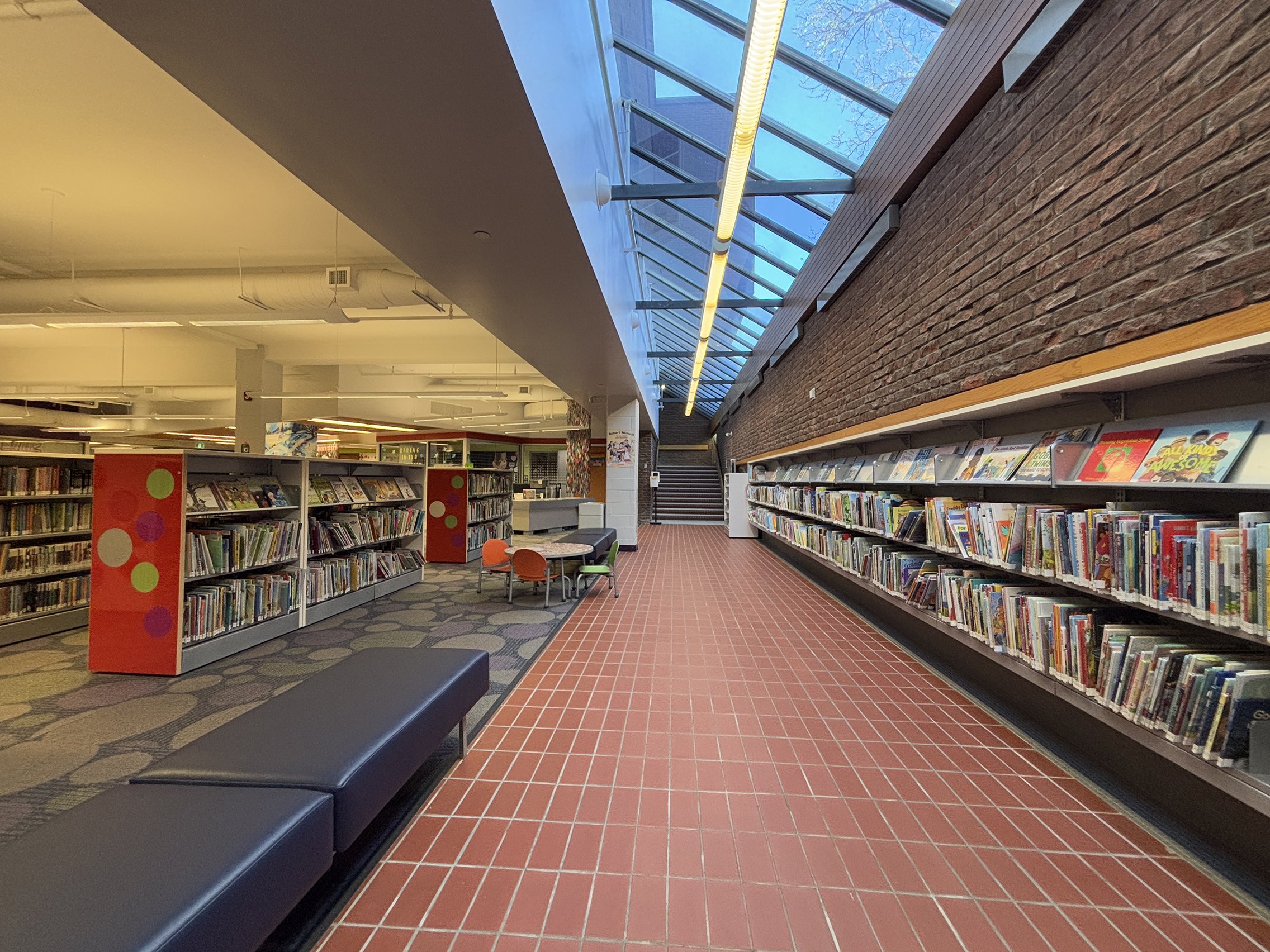
Richview Library

- Richview Library (Etobicoke Central Branch)
- Richview Residence for Seniors
- Richview Reservoir

=== Shopping Centres ===
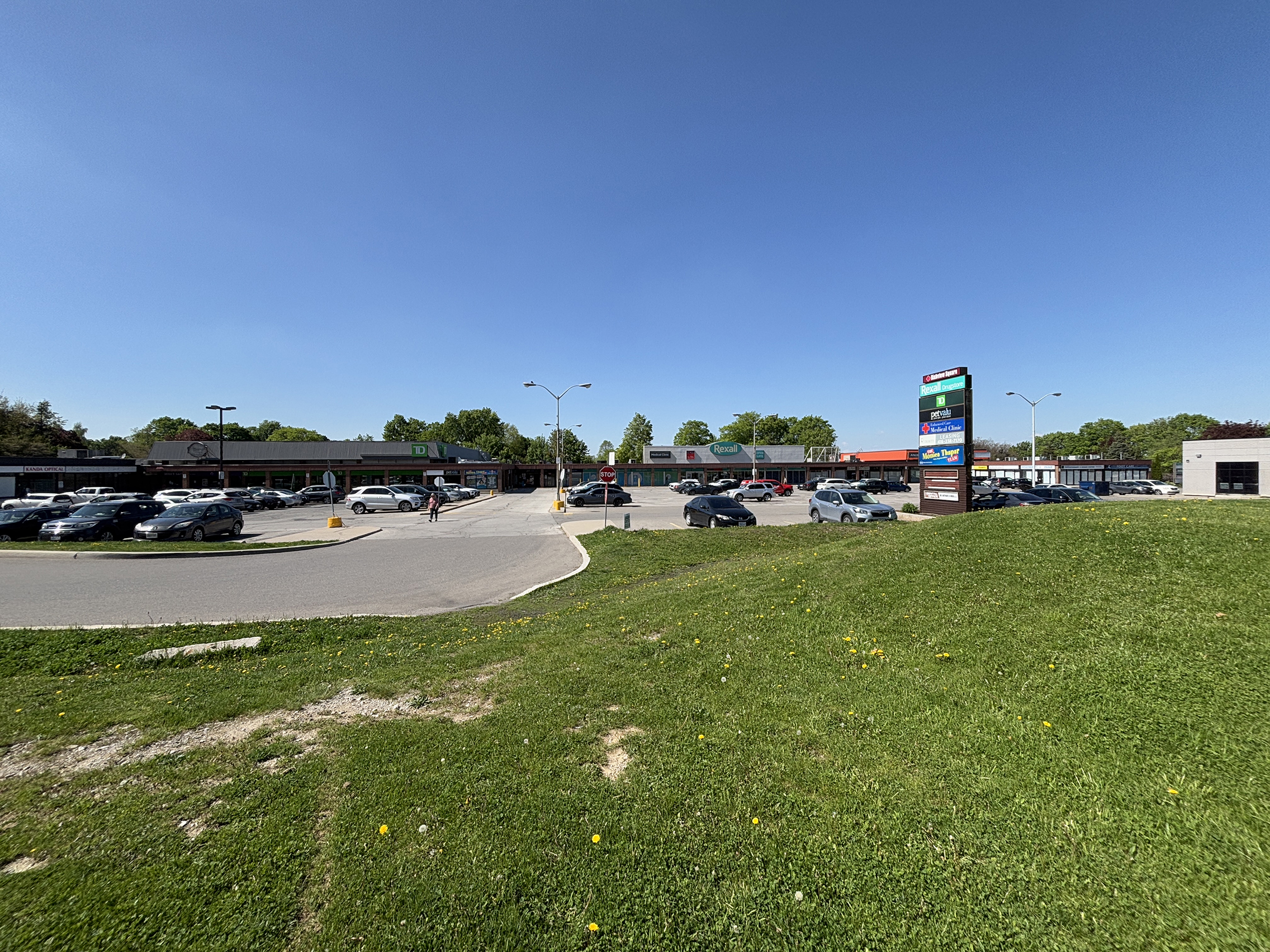
Richview Square

- 1500 Royal York Road Plaza
- Martingrove Plaza
- Richview Square
- Westway Centre

=== Parks ===
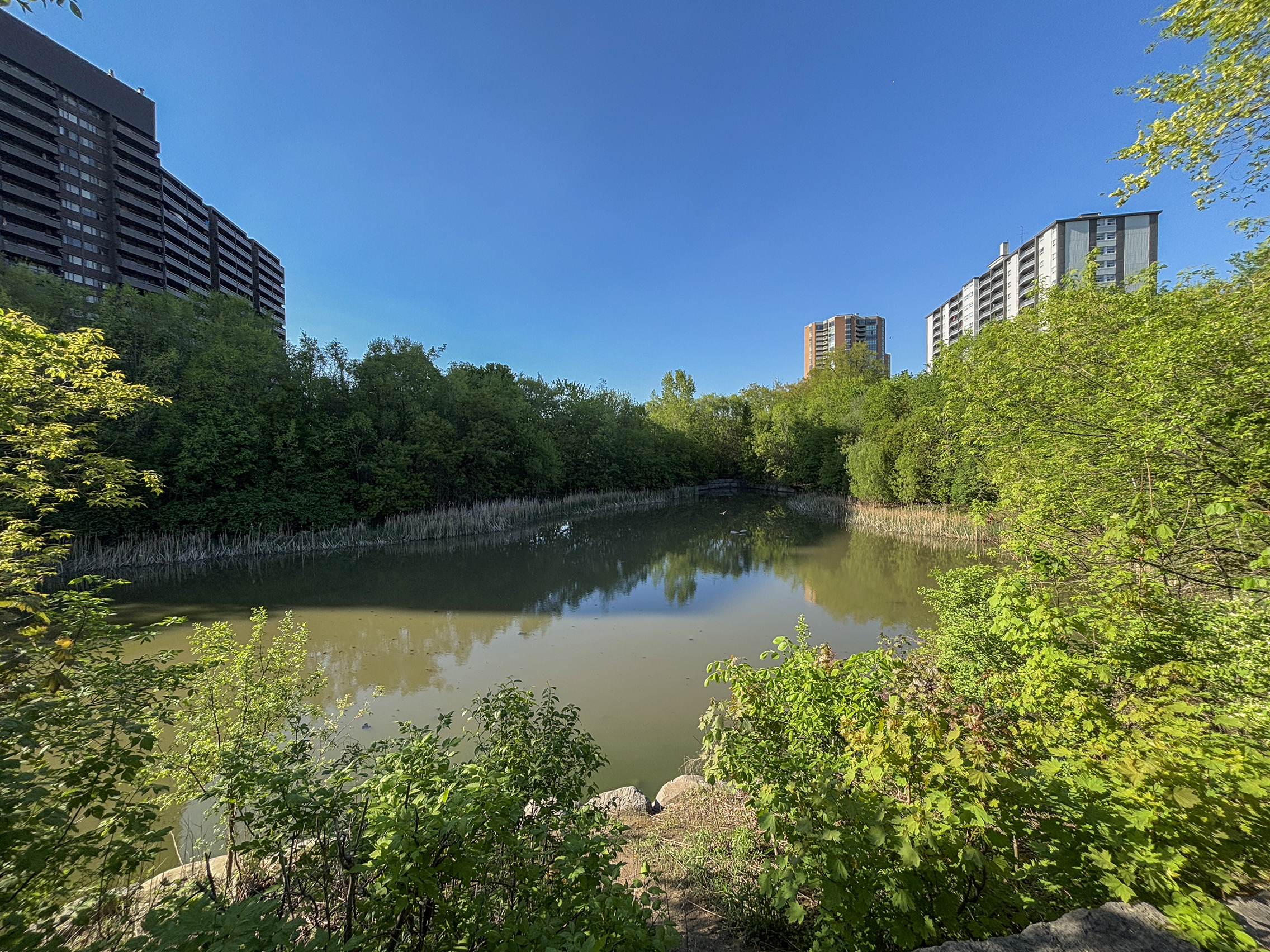
Wincott Wetland

- Alex Marchetti Park
- Denfield Park
- Green Meadows Park
- Lion's Gate Park
- Martin Grove Gardens Park
- Redgrave Park
- Richview Park
- Silvercreek Park
- Stonehouse Park
- Valleyfield Park
- Westgrove Park
- Westway Park
- Widdicombe Hill Park
- Willowridge Park
- Wincott Park

=== Churches ===
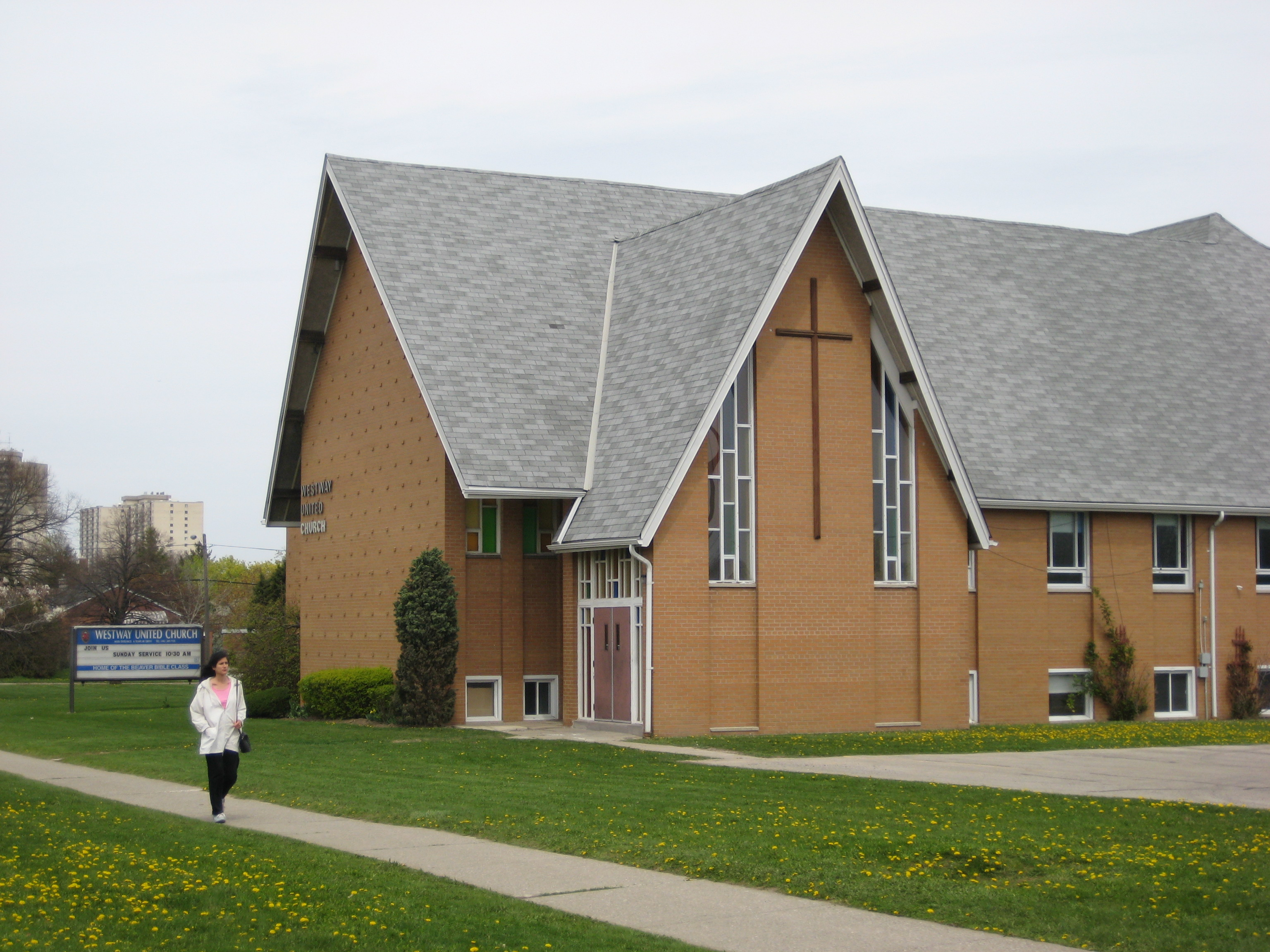
Westway United Church is one of several places of worship located in Richview.

- All Saints Catholic Church
- First Church of Christ, Scientist
- Hilltop Chapel
- Richview Baptist Church
- Royal York Baptist Church
- St. Matthias' Anglican Church
- St Wilfred Anglican Church
- Transfiguration of Our Lord Catholic Church
- Westway United Church
- Westway Christian Church

== Transportation ==
The Toronto Transit Commission (TTC) runs a number of buses through the Richview community that connect commuters to Kipling, Islington and Royal York subway stations on the Bloor-Danforth line.

- Islington Avenue is served by the 37 and 311 Islington buses.
- Kipling Avenue is served by the 45 Kipling bus route.
- Martin Grove Road is served by the 46 Martin Grove bus.
- Royal York Road is served by the 73 Royal York bus.

The TTC also has bus service along Dixon Road, Eglinton Avenue West and the Westway. These bus routes connect people to Eglinton West and Lawrence West subway stations on the Yonge-University-Spadina line.

- Dixon Road is served by the 52 A, B and D Lawrence West bus routes.
- Eglinton Avenue is served by the 32 and 307 Eglinton West buses.
- The Westway is served by the 52G Lawrence West bus route.

Traveling by car is convenient, as highways 401, 427 and 409 are nearby. The under construction Crosstown West extension will connect the neighbourhood to Renforth, as well as Midtown Toronto and Scarborough.

== Notable residents ==
- Rob Ford, former Mayor of Toronto
- Stephen Harper, former Prime Minister of Canada (attended Richview Collegiate Institute)
- Doug Ford, Premier of Ontario (attended Scarlett Heights)

== See also ==
- List of neighbourhoods in Toronto
