= Old Mill station =

Toronto subway station

Old Mill
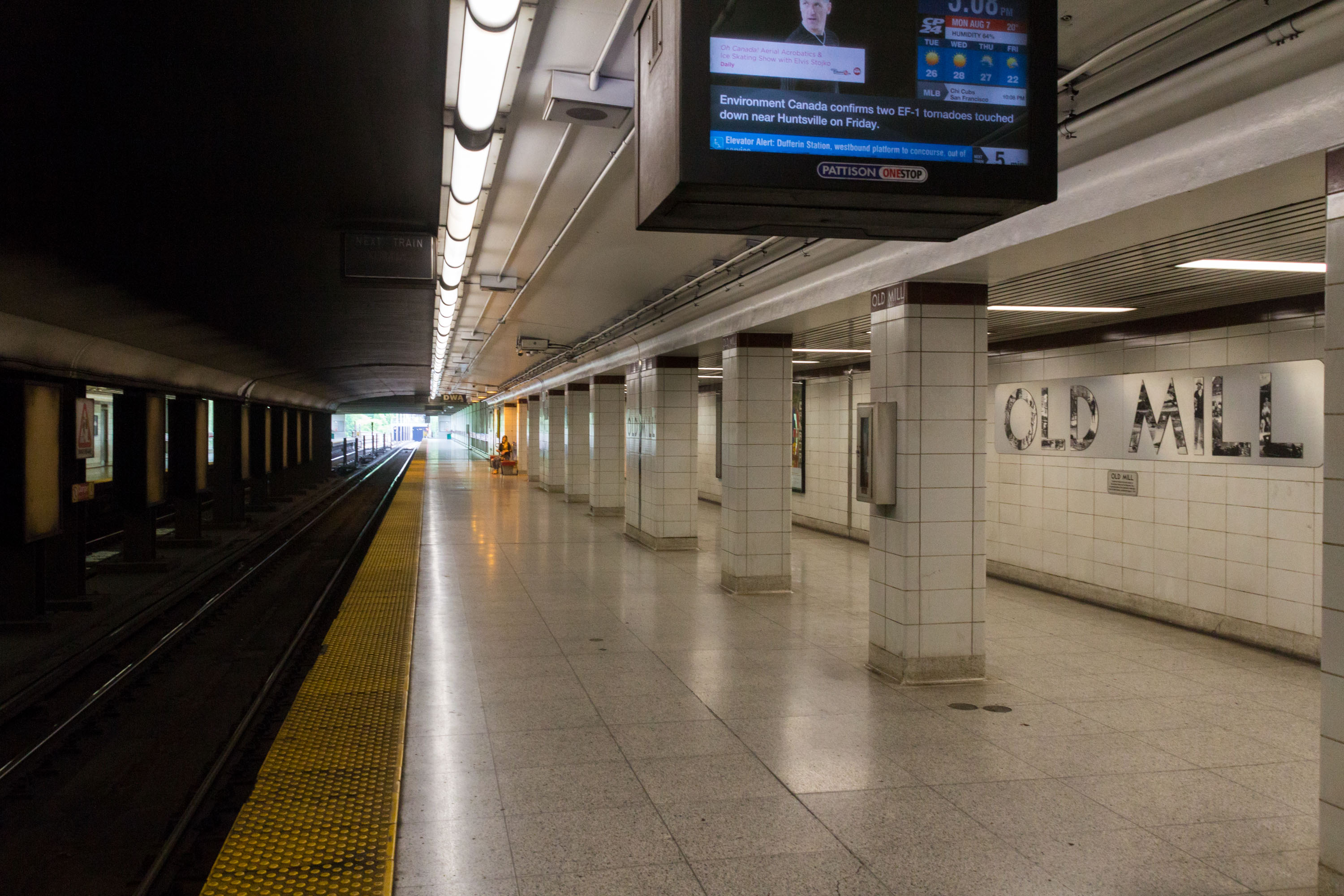

General information
- Location: 2672 Bloor Street West; Toronto, Ontario; Canada
- Coordinates: 43°38′59″N 79°29′40″W
- Platforms: Side platforms
- Tracks: 2
- Connections: TTC buses: 66 Prince Edward; 300 Bloor - Danforth

Construction
- Structure type: Underground/elevated
- Accessible: No

Other information
- Website: Official station page

History
- Opened: May 10, 1968; 58 years ago

Passengers
- 2023–2024: 6,109
- Rank: 64 of 70

Services
Preceding station	Toronto Transit Commission	Following station
Royal York towards Kipling	Line 2 Bloor–Danforth	Jane towards Kennedy
Track layout
Location

Old Mill is a subway station on Line 2 Bloor–Danforth of the Toronto subway in Toronto, Ontario, Canada. It is located at 2672 Bloor Street West at Old Mill Terrace and Humber Boulevard in the Kingsway residential neighbourhood. Nearby destinations include the Old Mill Inn and Park Lawn Cemetery.

== History ==
The station opened in 1968 in what was then the Borough of York.

On December 8, 2000, just after the subway had closed for the night, a fire broke out on a waste collection train and caused considerable damage to the station. The fire was most likely caused by a lit cigarette, disposed of in a garbage can at another station. This incident led the TTC to revise its waste protocol, now leaving all refuse outside stations for collection by truck.

== Station access upgrades ==
In 2024, two elevators will be added at the station from ground level to the two side platforms, along with the addition of other improvements such as tactile attention tiles, improved signage and CCTV cameras along the new accessible pathway. Construction was expected to start in the second quarter of 2025, and is budgeted for completion in 2028. Old Mill will be the last Toronto subway station to be made accessible.

== Subway infrastructure ==
The station is built on the west side of the Humber River valley. The west end of the station lies underground with the tunnel continuing toward Royal York. The east end of the platform is elevated on a viaduct that takes the line across the river to re-enter the tunnel on the other side of the valley toward Jane Station.

Glass walls at the train platform's east end provide a view of the riverside park. Bird of prey shaped cutouts have been applied to these large windows to reduce the number of avian fatalities.

From when the station opened in 1968 until 1973, buses and the subway trains serving the station were in separate fare zones and the station's bus loop was located outside the street entrance. Although the bus platforms have still not been integrated into the station's fare-paid area, since only the one bus route is affected, this has a relatively minor impact on the flow of passengers through the turnstiles.

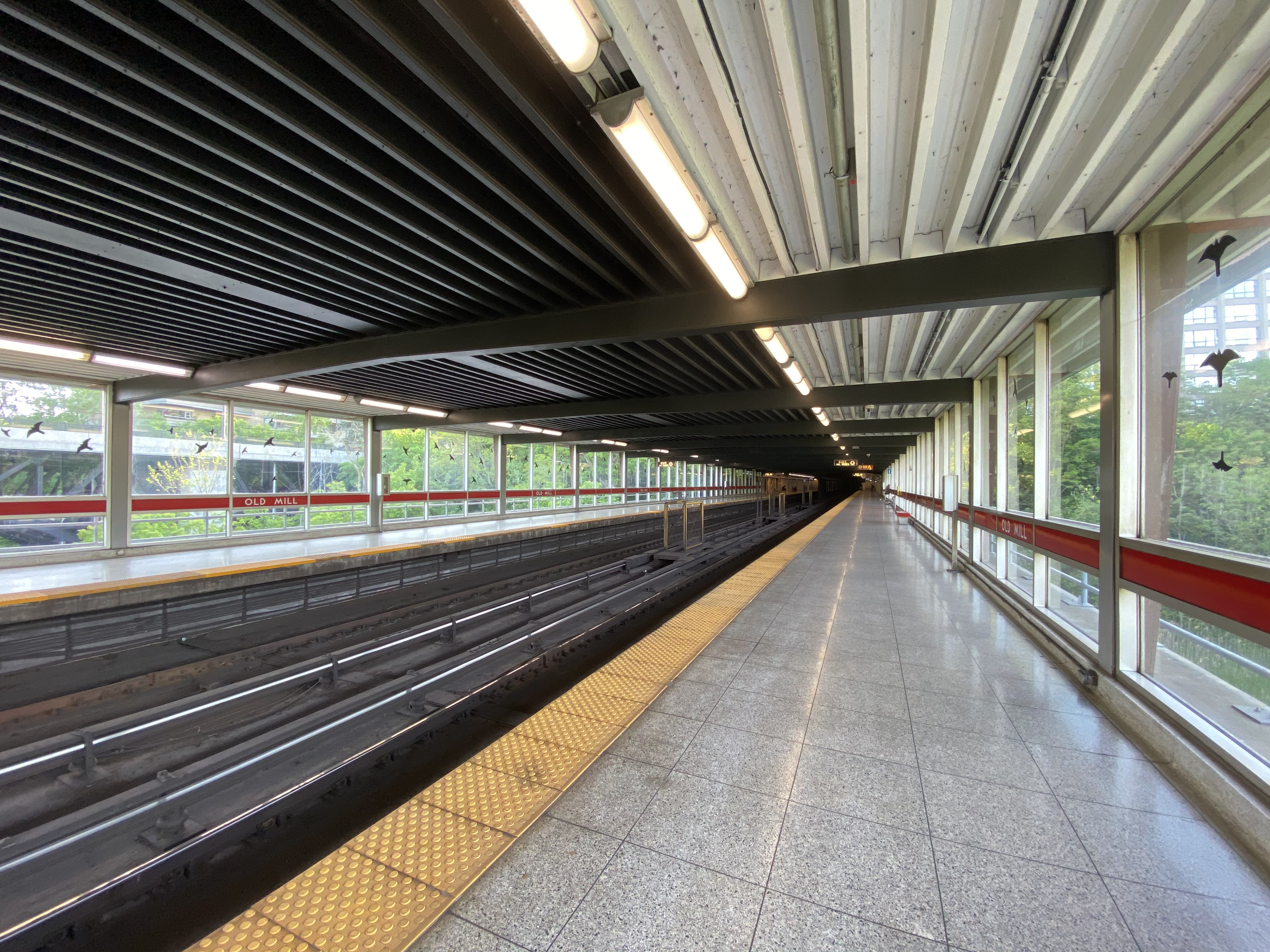
At the west end of the station, the line goes underground in a tunnel toward Royal York station.

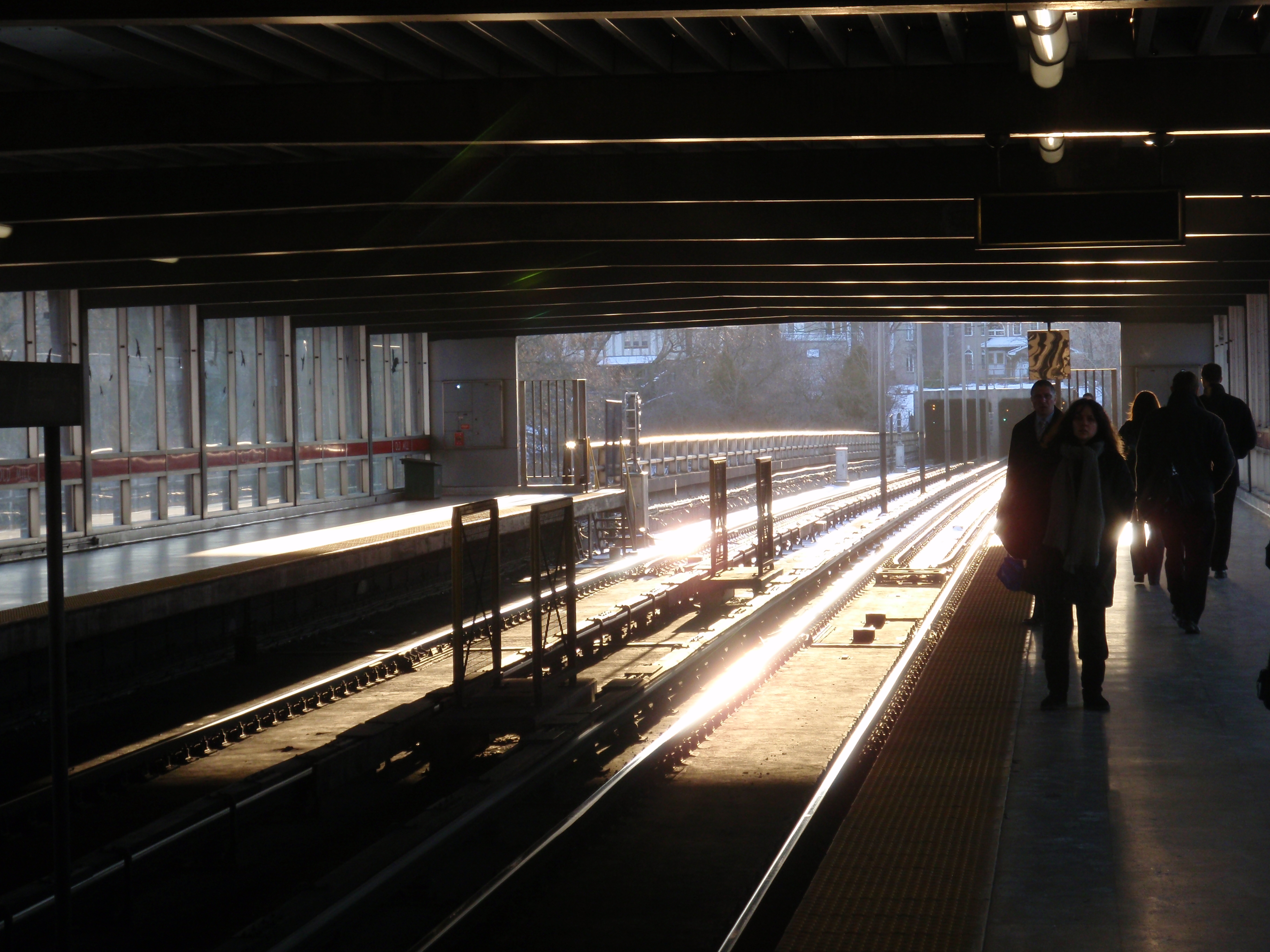
To the east, the tracks are elevated across the Humber River valley and into the tunnel portal toward Jane station.

== Surface connections ==
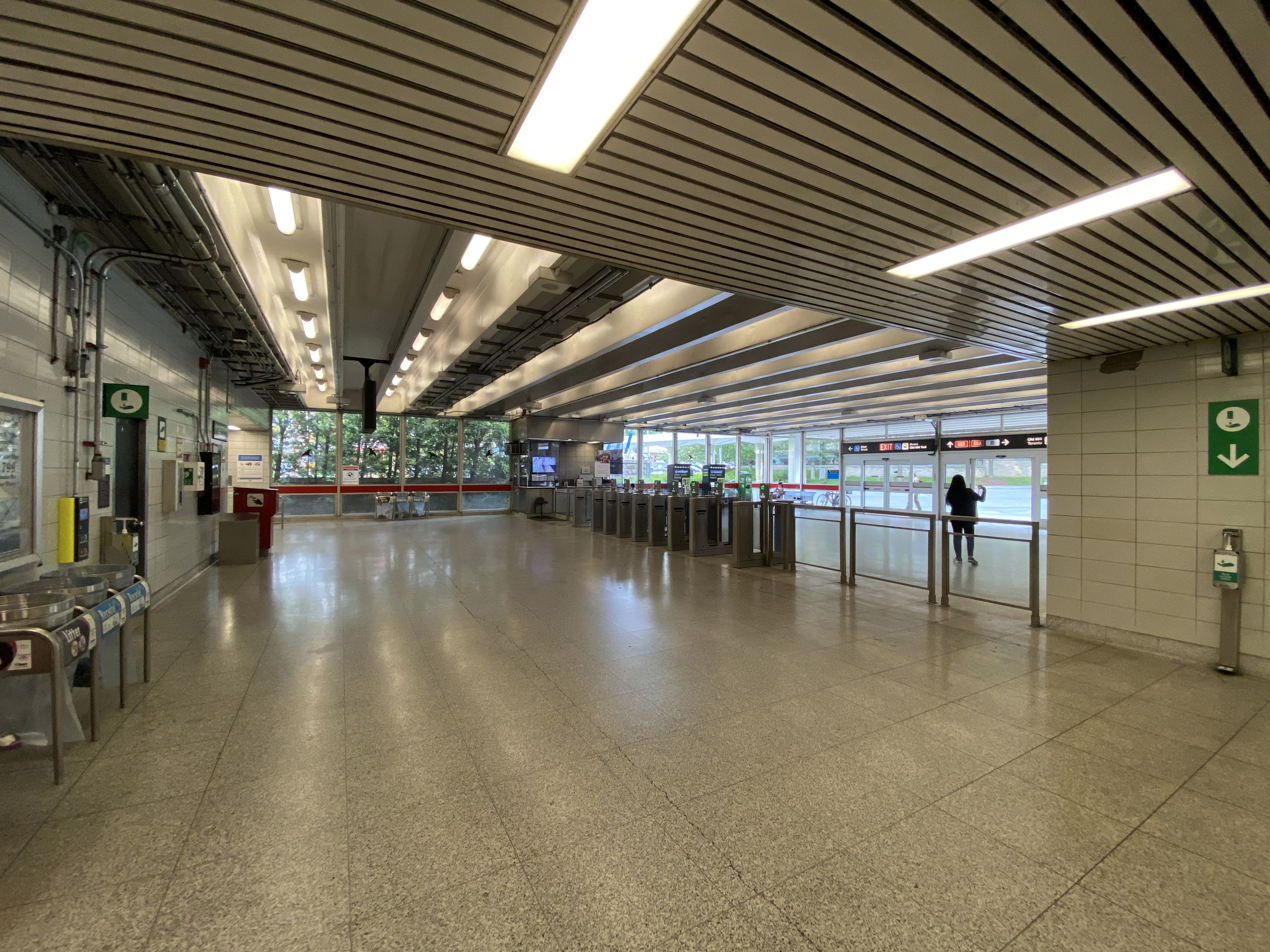
Concourse

The station's bus platform is not within the fare-paid area.

TTC routes serving the station include:

Route	Name	Additional information
66A	Prince Edward	Southbound to Humber Loop
66B	Prince Edward	Southbound to Lake Shore Boulevard
