= Old Mill Toronto =

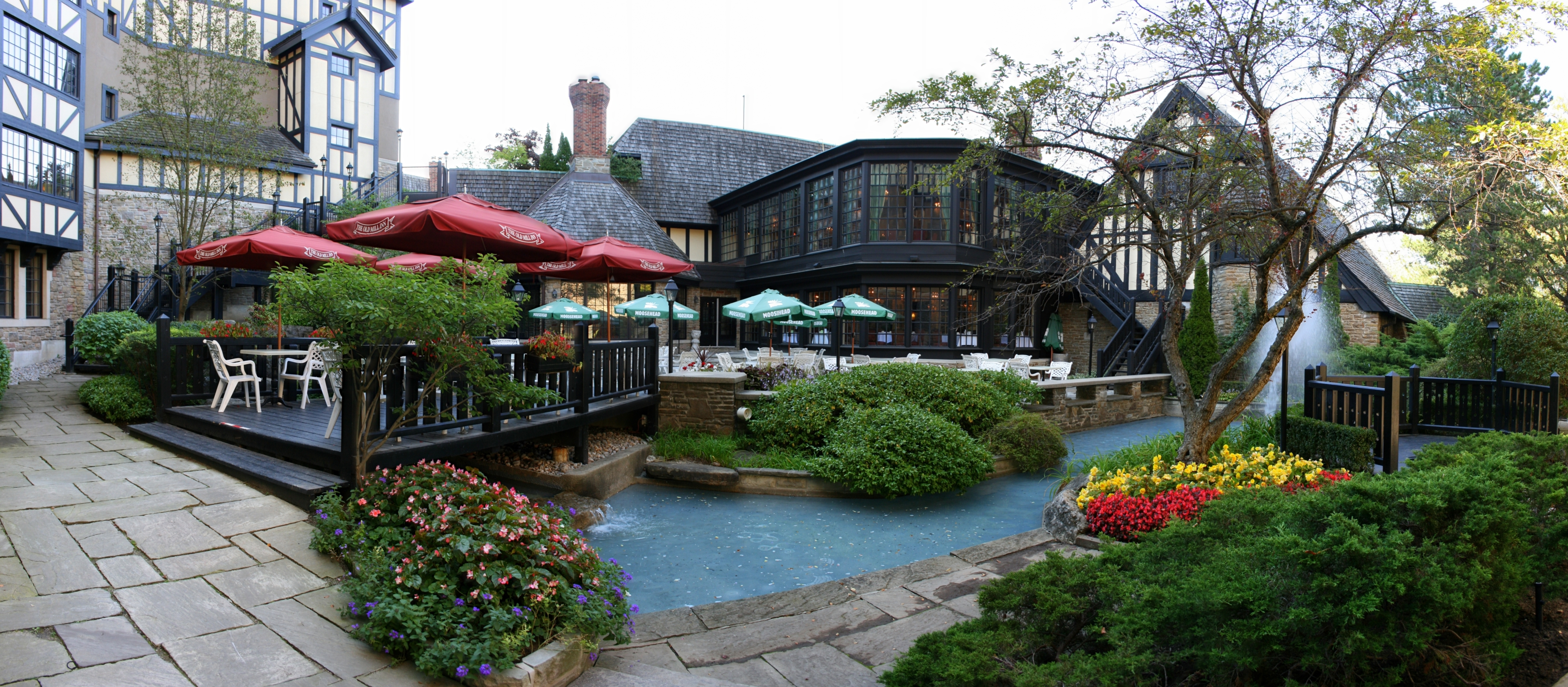
- The Old Mill in 2011

General information
- Location: 21 Old Mill Road, Toronto, Ontario, Canada
- Coordinates: 43°39′3″N 79°29′36″W
- Opened: July 28, 1914 (tea room); October 2001 (hotel)
- Owner: OMT Hospitality Inc.

Other information
- Number of rooms: 57
- Number of restaurants: 1
- Facilities: jazz bar, wedding chapel, spa, meeting rooms, restaurant, flower shop

Website
- oldmilltoronto.com

The Old Mill Toronto is an event venue with a boutique hotel, spa and restaurant, in The Kingsway neighbourhood of Toronto, Ontario, Canada. It includes facilities for business meetings, conferences, celebrations and weddings, with an on-site chapel and wedding garden. Its restaurant has served afternoon tea since it opened in 1914 and serves Sunday family brunch and dinner buffets.

The facility is located on Old Mill Road north of Bloor Street, just west of the Humber River. The Old Mill subway station is a short distance away.

== History ==
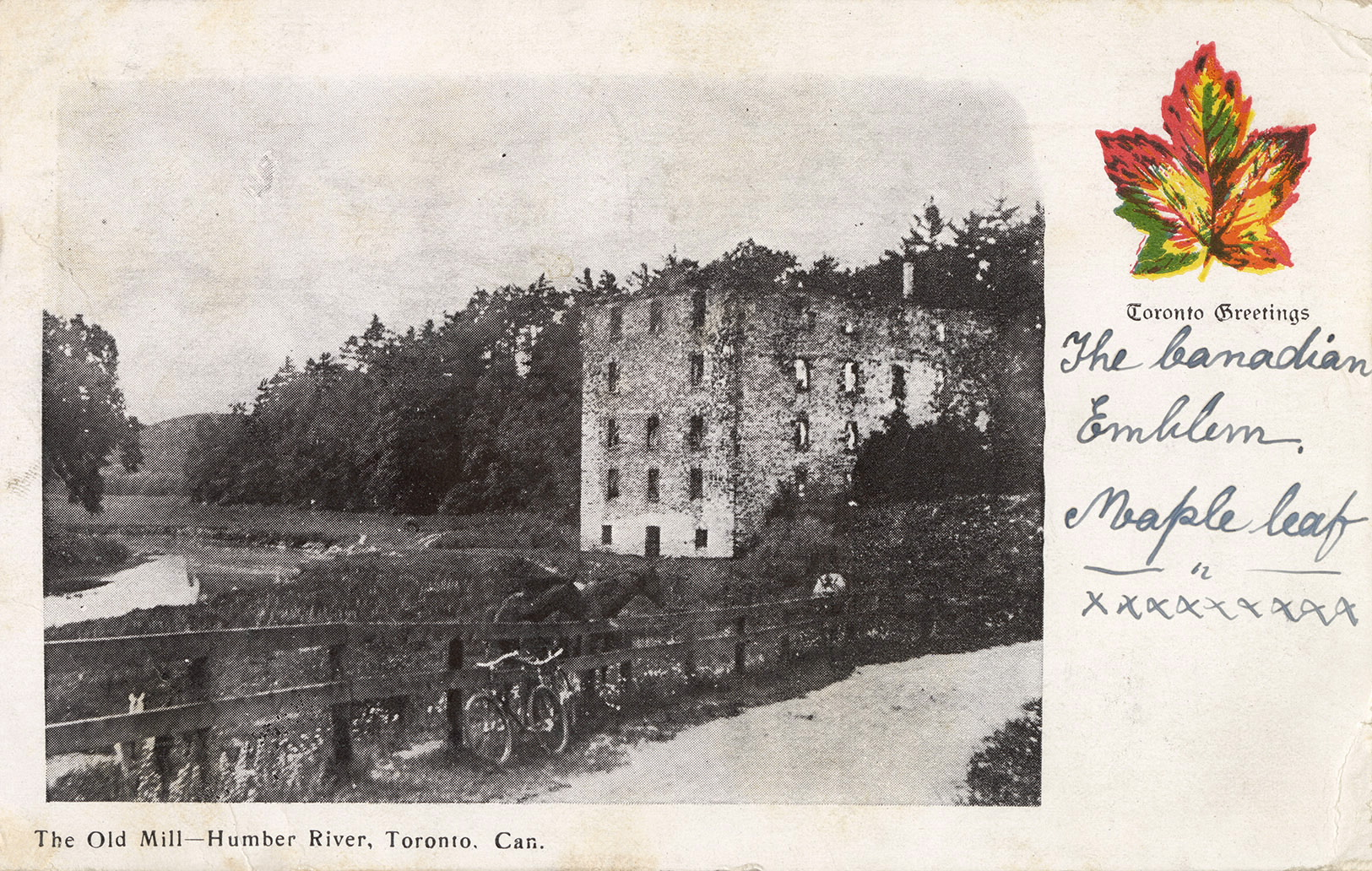
The pictured ruins stood until their demolition in the year 2000.

The Old Mill is near the site of Toronto's first sawmill, built c. 1793. A series of mill complexes were built on the site, all of which were destroyed by fire. The last of these was built in 1848 by William Tyrell and burned in 1881. Its multi-storey ruins stood until the year 2000.

The Old Mill Tea Garden restaurant was founded by Robert Home Smith in 1914, next to the mill's ruins. It was part of the Kingsway residential development by Smith.

Over the ensuing decades, 16 banquet rooms were added. In the 1980s, a wedding chapel was built adjacent to the historic mill's ruins. These ruins were demolished in the year 2000, and a modern hotel was built on the site, in the architectural style of the adjacent 1914 restaurant.

The Tea Garden was a place for dancing to big band music in the 1920s, and still today this tradition carries on. It was designated as a heritage property in 1983 by the former city of Etobicoke and retains that designation with Toronto. An historical plaque of Étienne Brûlé is near the main entrance.

It has changed owners three times, and was bought by the Kalmar family in 1991. In 2015, the property was sold to OMT Hospitality.
