= Royal York station =

Toronto subway station

Royal York
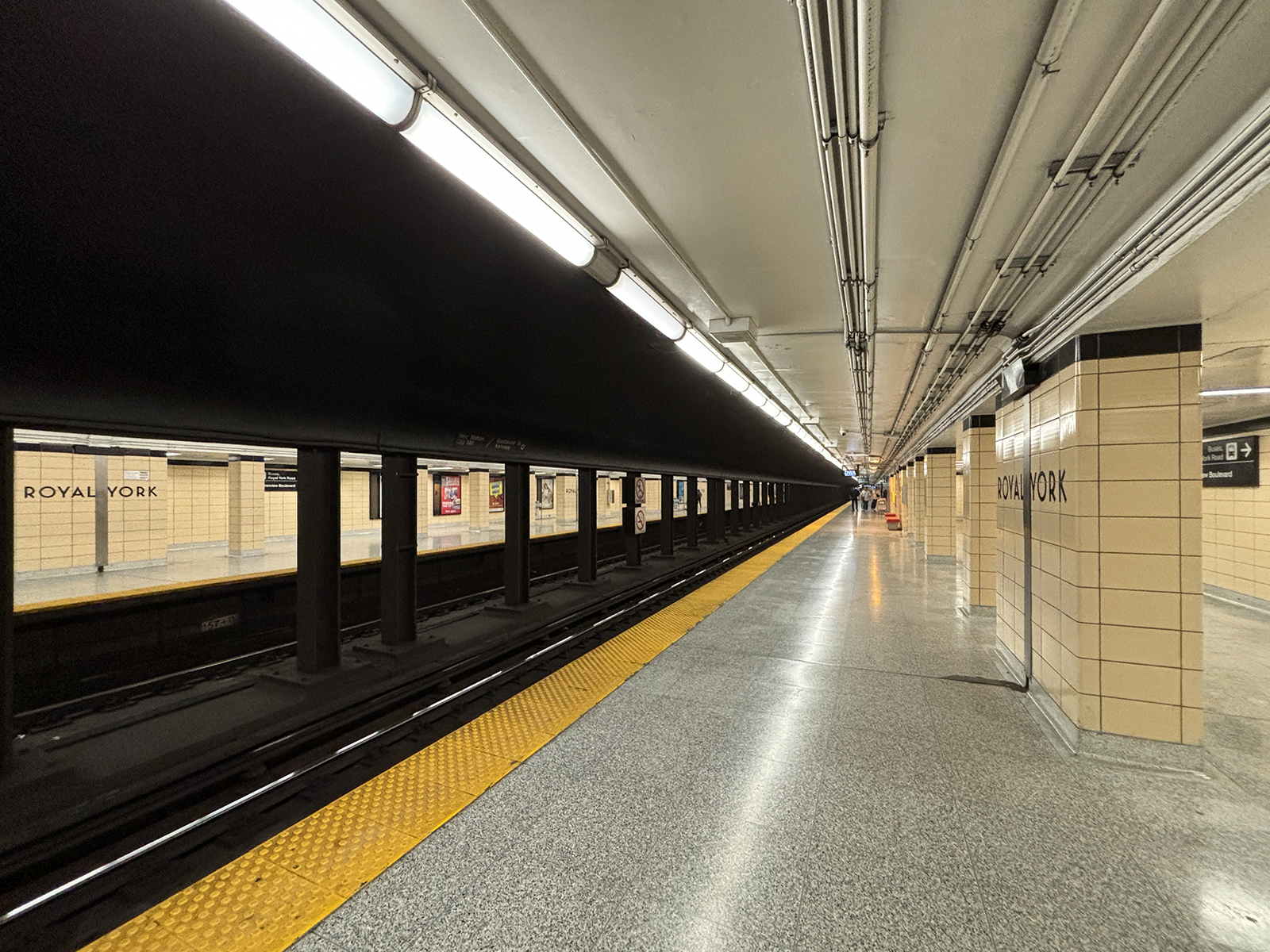

General information
- Location: 955 Royal York Road; Toronto, Ontario; Canada
- Coordinates: 43°38′53″N 79°30′41″W
- Platforms: Side platforms
- Tracks: 2
- Connections: TTC buses: 15 Evans; 48 Rathburn; 73 Royal York; 76 Royal York South; 300 Bloor - Danforth; 315 Evans-Brown's Line

Construction
- Structure type: Underground
- Accessible: Yes

Other information
- Website: Official station page

History
- Opened: May 10, 1968; 58 years ago

Passengers
- 2023–2024: 17,337
- Rank: 43 of 70

Services
Preceding station	Toronto Transit Commission	Following station
Islington towards Kipling	Line 2 Bloor–Danforth	Old Mill towards Kennedy
Location

Royal York is a subway station on Line 2 Bloor–Danforth of the Toronto subway in Toronto, Ontario, Canada. It is located just north of Bloor Street West on the east side of Royal York Road.

== History ==
The station was opened in 1968 in what was then the Borough of Etobicoke.

The original plan for the Bloor-Danforth extension to Islington had different stations than what was eventually built. The stations were to be at "Montgomery" and "Prince Edward", instead of Islington and Royal York. This was probably because these two streets were the ends of the Kingsway shopping district. However, it was decided to include only one station in the Kingsway, at Royal York.

Until 1973 the buses and the subway trains serving the station were in separate fare zones and so the turnstiles and collector booths were on the mezzanine level between the bus bays and the subway platforms. When the zones were abolished, they were moved to just inside the street entrance, bringing the buses inside the station's fare-paid area.

A local "zone 2" bus service continued to run along Bloor Street west of Jane, paralleling the "zone 1" subway, from the station's opening through the zone abolishment in 1973, and continued to run even after the bus and subway were in the same zone. The success of the bus service may be attributed to the distances between subway stops in Etobicoke; Royal York is over 1 km west of Old Mill, and Islington is over 1 km (0.62 mi) west of Royal York. (By comparison, stops at Montgomery, Prince Edward and Old Mill would all be within 1 km of each other, as are all stops on the Bloor-Danforth from Old Mill through Main Street, an east-west corridor served almost entirely by the subway line.) The local bus service was discontinued in 1984, although the long station spacing remains; only at night are buses still seen along this stretch.

Construction began in mid-2017 to make the station fully accessible, including the addition of three elevators and accessible fare gates. On December 16, 2019, the station became accessible with the completion of the elevator construction.

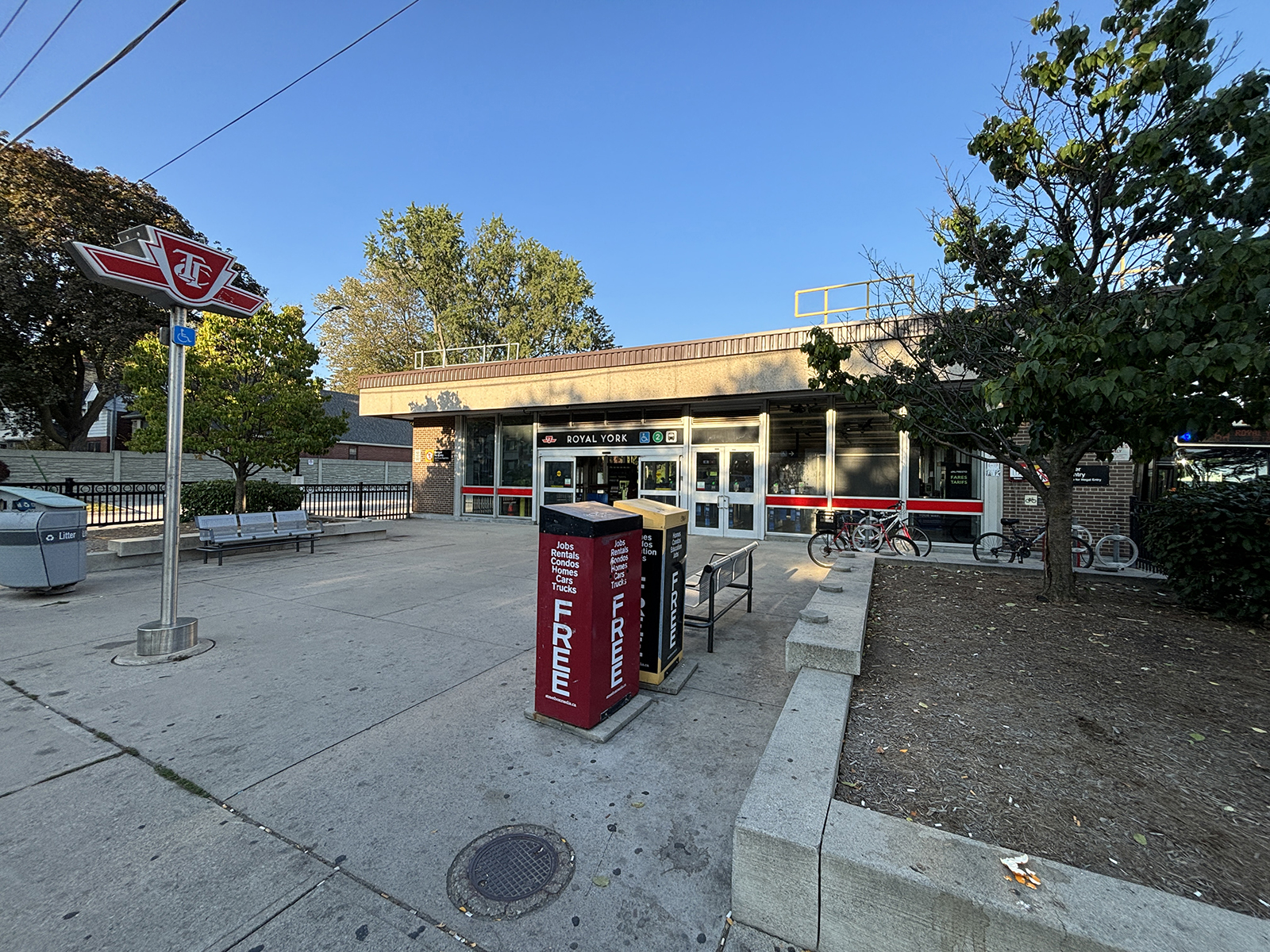
Main exterior entrance

Secondary entrance on Grenview Boulevard

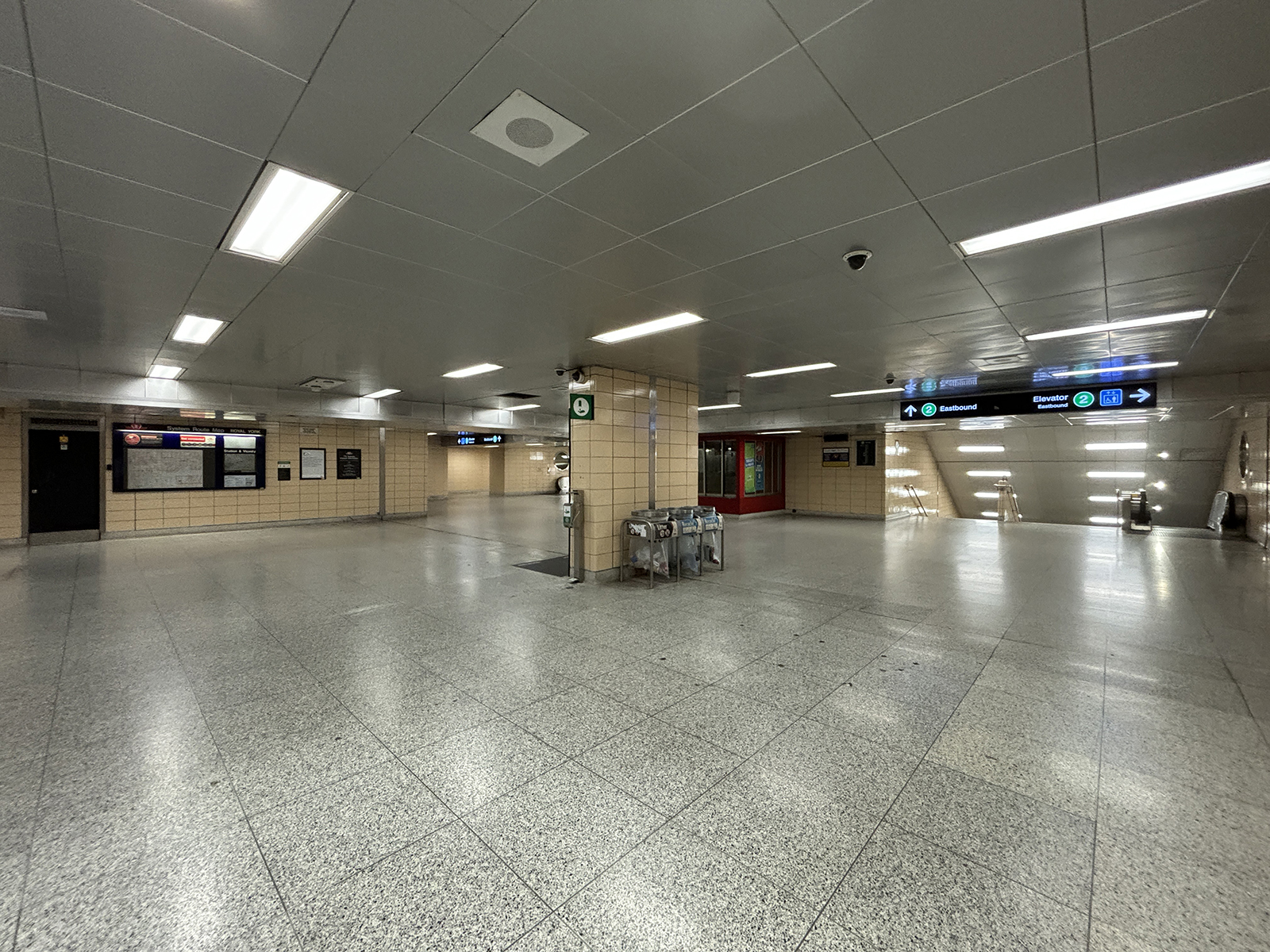
Lower ground-level concourse

== Nearby landmarks ==
Nearby landmarks include Our Lady of Sorrows Roman Catholic Church in the Kingsway and Mimico Creek.

== Surface connections ==
TTC routes serving the station include:

Bay	Route	Name	Additional information
1	73B	Royal York	Northbound to Mount Dennis station via La Rose Avenue and Emmett Avenue
1	73C	Royal York	Northbound to Claireport via Albion Road
1	73D	Royal York	Northbound to Albion Road and Weston Road (Rush hour service)
2	48	Rathburn	Westbound to Mill Road
2	Wheel-Trans		
3	Spare		
4	15	Evans	Westbound to Sherway Gardens
4	76A	Royal York South	Southbound to Lake Shore (past Mimico GO Station)
4	76B	Royal York South	Southbound to the Queensway and Grand Avenue
	315	Evans-Brown's Line	Blue Night service; westbound to Long Branch
