= Our Lady of Sorrows Roman Catholic Church (The Kingsway, Toronto) =

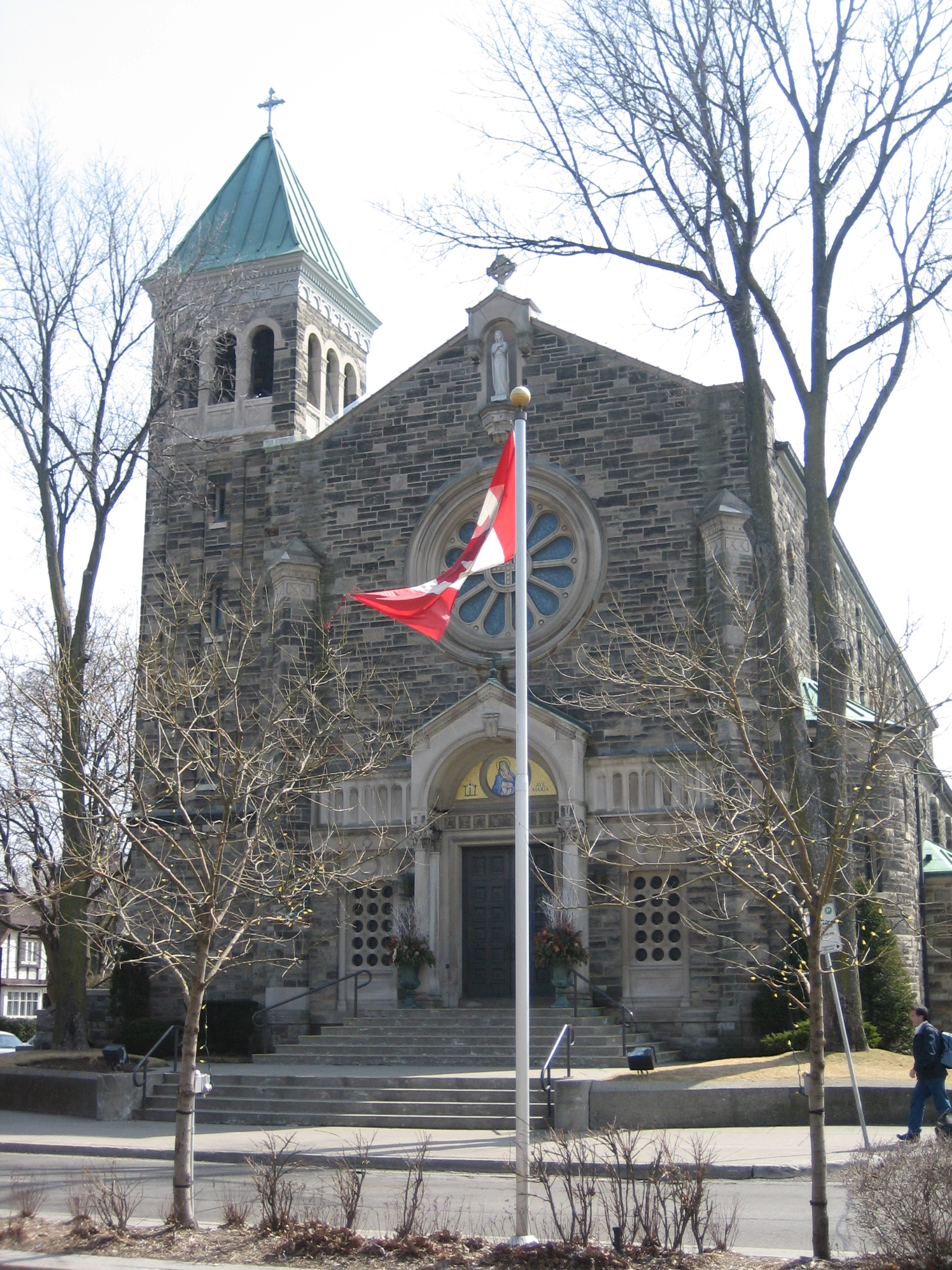
- Church on Bloor Street West
- Our Lady of Sorrows Roman Catholic Church
- 43°38′48″N 79°30′45″W
- Location: 3055 Bloor Street West; Toronto, Ontario; M8X 1C6
- Denomination: Roman Catholic

History
- Founded: 1940
- Dedication: Our Lady of Sorrows

Architecture
- Architect: James Haffa

Administration
- Diocese: Archdiocese of Toronto

Clergy
- Pastor: Fr Chris Cauchi

Our Lady of Sorrows is a Roman Catholic church in Toronto, Ontario, Canada, is located in the neighbourhood of The Kingsway in the former city of Etobicoke. The parish includes the central section of Etobicoke where two much earlier Catholic missions once served as the first Roman Catholic places of worship in Etobicoke.

== History ==
Mission Churches

As the Township of Etobicoke was first settled by British military families, there were few Catholics in the municipality. The area was technically in the early Catholic Parish of St Patrick's, Dixie (near Toronto's present day airport) although early Catholic residents of southern Etobicoke found the early parish of St Helen's in Toronto's western suburb of Brockton more convenient. The Diocese of Toronto established, at different times in the late 19th century, two mission churches of St Patrick's, Dixie, in Etobicoke: St Joseph's and St Rita's. Both these early missions were on Dundas Street West in the centre of Etobicoke, an area now within the boundaries of Our Lady of Sorrows Parish. In the early 20th century, southern Etobicoke began to rapidly urbanise and new municipalities were formed out of Etobicoke which left the rest of the township a rural municipality centred on the Islington postal village at Dundas and Bloor. The first permanent Catholic parishes were founded in the independent Lakeshore municipalities of Mimico (St Leo's) and New Toronto (St Teresa's).

Founding of the Parish

Central Etobicoke was planned for development as a more exclusive residential neighbourhood than those that had separated from the township to the south, by Robert Home Smith, which eventually led to the creation of the first parish to remain in Etobicoke; Our Lady of Sorrows, in 1940. Founded during the Second World War, the first years of the parish were very active with parishioners organising to aid wartime charities. The construction of Our Lady of Sorrows Elementary School, which opened in 1942 as Etobicoke's first permanent Catholic school was quickly followed just to the west by the first Catholic high schools in the Township: St Joseph's Islington in 1949 (girls school run by the Sisters of St. Joseph) and Michael Power in 1947 (boys school run by the teaching Basilian Order of priests, named after Toronto's first catholic Bishop). For many years the pastor of Our Lady of Sorrows, Msgr, later Bishop Francis Allen worked in the parish, even after his episcopal ordination, concentrating on the need to establish catholic schools in the rapidly developing township.

Recent Changes

In 1967, the independent 'Lakeshore Municipalities' to the south, rejoined Etobicoke to form the Borough of Etobicoke, leaving St Leo's church as the oldest catholic church in the township. Our Lady of Sorrows Parish originally included much of Etobicoke to the north which only slowly separated into new parishes as Etobicoke urbanised and redevelopment of Dundas Street cut the area off from Our Lady of Sorrows parish. However, the parish continues to serve Catholics in The Kingsway and Islington; the neighbourhoods at the historic commercial and administrative centre of Etobicoke. In 1958 the Etobicoke municipal offices moved to the developing area around the new highway 427, the amalgamated Michael Power/St. Joseph High School following the move west in 1993 while to the south, the former Kingsmill Public Secondary School was reopened by the catholic school board as Bishop Allen Academy. The parish celebrated its 50th anniversary in 1990 by publishing a history which makes clear the central role the parish has played in the history of all Catholic communities in Etobicoke. The 50th anniversary of Our Lady of Sorrows Elementary School followed shortly after although tinged by controversy as the old school was replaced by a modern building which was completed in 2003.

== Pastors ==
- Rev. Gregory F. Kelly, 1940 — 1952
- Most Rev. Bishop Francis V. Allen, 1952 — 1972
- Rev. Msgr. G. William O'Brien, 1972 — 1984
- Rev. Msgr. Samuel J. Bianco, 1984 — 1994
- Rev. Msgr. K. Robitaille, 1994 — 2001
- Rev. Msgr. Mariano Polito, 2001 — 2005
- Rev. Nino Cavoto, 2005 — 2020
- Rev. Chris Cauchi, 2020 — 2021 (Administrator)
- Rev. Chris Cauchi, 2021 -

== School ==
- Our Lady of Sorrows Elementary School
- Bishop Allen Academy

Formerly:

- St Joseph School for Girls, Islington (Sisters of St Joseph)
- Michael Power School for Boys (Basilian Fathers)

== See also ==
- The Kingsway
- Roman Catholic Archdiocese of Toronto
