= The Kingsway, Toronto =

The Kingsway
- Neighbourhood
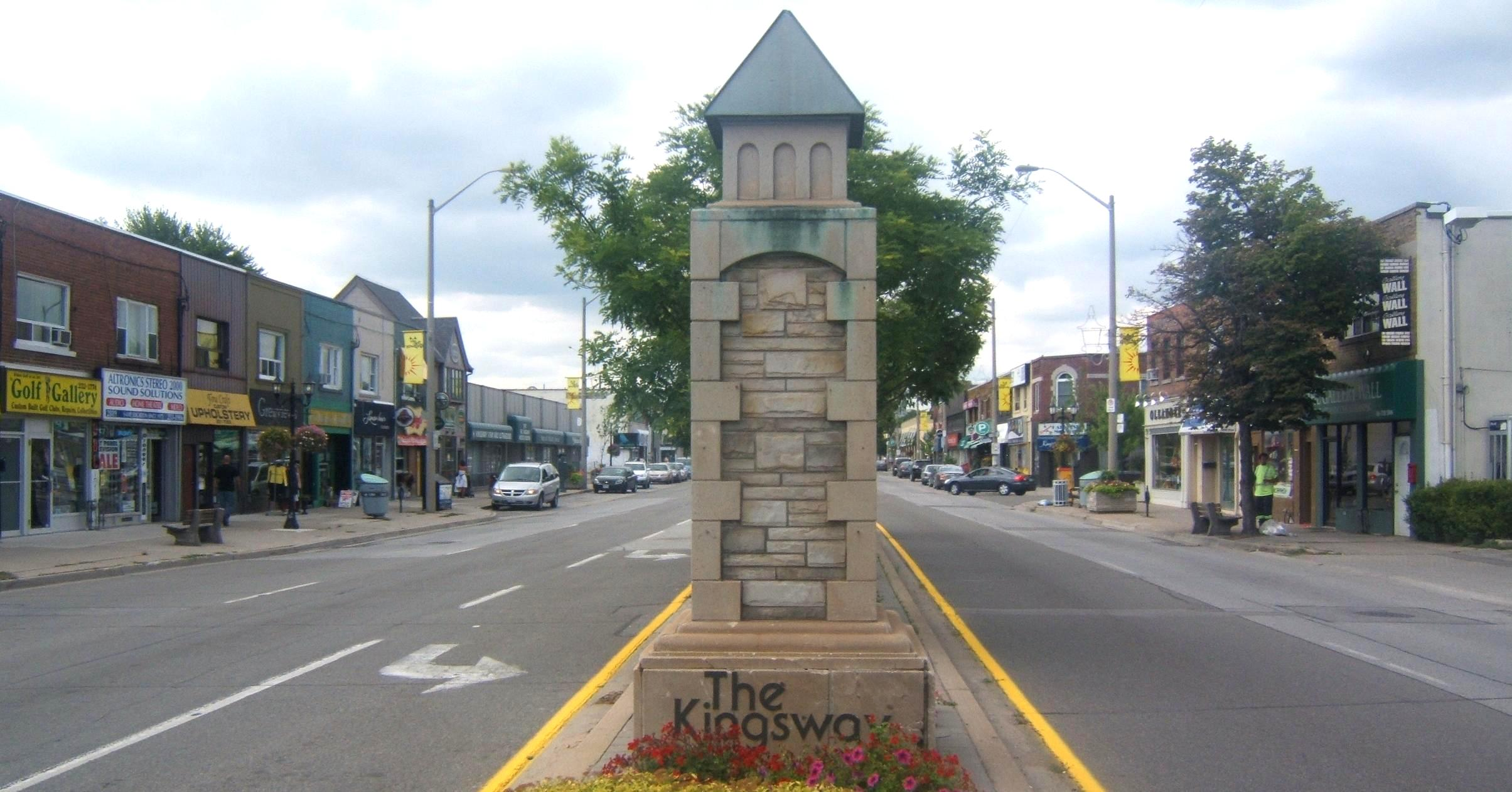
- Entrance to the Kingsway on Bloor Street West

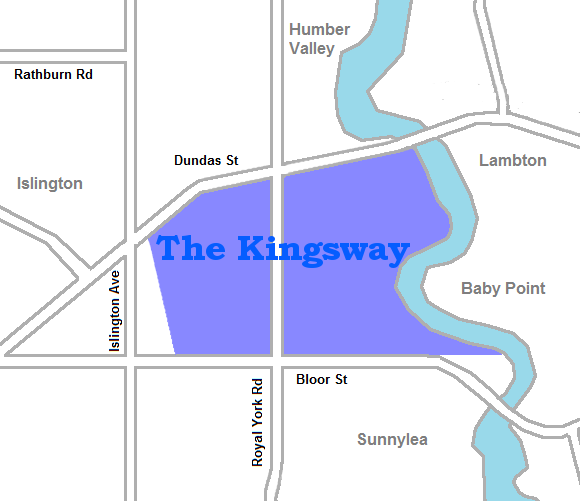
- Vicinity of The Kingsway

- Location within Toronto
- Coordinates: 43°38′51″N 79°30′41″W
- Country: Canada
- Province: Ontario
- City: Toronto
- Established: 1850 Etobicoke Township
- Subdivided: 1912 (Subdivision)
- Changed municipality: 1998 Toronto from City of Etobicoke

Government
  - MP: James Maloney (Etobicoke—Lakeshore)
  - MPP: Lee Fairclough (Etobicoke—Lakeshore)
  - Councillor: Amber Morley (Ward 3 Etobicoke—Lakeshore)

The Kingsway is a residential neighbourhood in Toronto, Ontario, Canada. It is bounded by Bloor Street to the south, Dundas Street to the north, the Mimico Creek to the west and the Humber River to the east. The neighbourhood was officially known as Kingsway Park, which later became replaced by its nickname the Kingsway. In this neighbourhood, the Kingsway specifically refers to a two-lane road beginning in the south-east corner of the neighbourhood extending northerly in a north-west direction past Dundas Street.

For planning purposes, the neighbourhood is known by the City of Toronto as "Kingsway South" to differentiate it from a more recent extension of the Kingsway road north of Dundas Street. "Kingsway South" is not used by residents, due to confusion with the South Kingsway, a street located east of the Humber River and extending south from Bloor Street. Originally the Kingsway road and South Kingsway were supposed to be one continuous route, however the intended connection (including a crossing of the Humber River) was instead occupied by the westward extension of Bloor Street. South Kingsway consequently acts as a southern continuation of Jane Street, and continues south where it interchanges with the Queensway before ending at the Gardiner Expressway.

== History ==
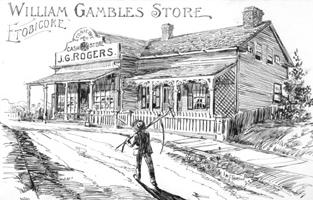
The Gamble's store was situated in the community of Lambton Mills, on the west side of the Humber River, south of Dundas Street, 1893.

The area now known as the Kingsway is a combination of three distinct areas:

- The first area to be built on was south of Government Road, east of Prince Edward Drive which formed the government King's Mill Reserve; a large forested area with the Old Mill at the centre, on Bloor beside the Humber River. This part of the modern Kingsway, now centred on the street the Kingsway, was the least developed area until the neighbourhood was subdivided; it is now the most exclusive (and leafy) part of the Kingsway as well as its namesake; the street the Kingsway beginning at gates beside the Old King's Mill.
- Along Dundas from the Humber River to Royal York was the Etobicoke side of York Township's community of Lambton Mills. With a second mill on the western (Etobicoke) side, this area was the first to develop but is today the least affluent part of the Kingsway.
- South of Bloor, west of Prince Edward Drive formed a typical farming community dominated by the Thompson family; sometimes called Thompson Estates by local developers. Today this community is only slightly less affluent than the former Kingsmill, although picturesque along the Mimico Creek which winds through the former Thompson farms. One of the two Thompson homes, Spring Bank Cottage, survives facing Royal York at the top of the hill overlooking Mimico Creek.

=== The Kingsway Garden Subdivision ===
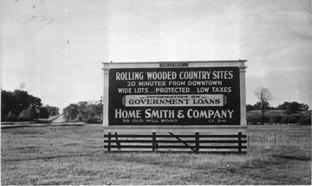
An advertisement for residential development by Robert Home Smith & Company, 1930. Smith designed the Kingsway in adherence to the principles of the Garden city movement.

The neighbourhood was first developed by Etobicoke lawyer Robert Home Smith who purchased the old King's Mill (which was renamed the Old Mill, reopening as a high-end Inn) and began developing land in the early 1900s. The Kingsway emerged from Home Smith's vision of the ideal community and was mostly inspired by the Garden City principles, which were originally conceived in parts of England and the United States during the late 19th and early 20th centuries. Indeed, Smith was a big fan of everything English, and this inclination instructed his ideas for the neighbourhood. By the 1920s, those ideas culminated into the development, which he named Kingsway Park.

"Tastefully appointed" traditional homes were sited on well-treed and winding streets, to create an air of a wooded retreat. Home Smith also decreed that no owner could build a house without the approval of his staff, and he developed strict regulations against the cutting of trees. Most of the homes were designed in the Arts and crafts style, which had become popular during that time. Smith insisted on the use of locally sourced materials for the houses in Kingsway Park, such as sandstone quarried from around the Humber River and Credit River areas.

Kingsway Park was aimed at affluent home buyers. Street names such as Queen Anne Road and Kingsgarden Road emphasized the appearance of English respectability and affluence that Smith was selling. Smith also created the Old Mill Restaurant in the community, whose Tudor Revival facade and well-appointed interior inspired much of the English design in the Kingsway.

Despite its well-intentioned approach to traditionalism, the Kingsway was a neighbourhood built for the automobile, and all houses were built with discreetly placed garages, as per Smith's wishes.

=== Recent development ===
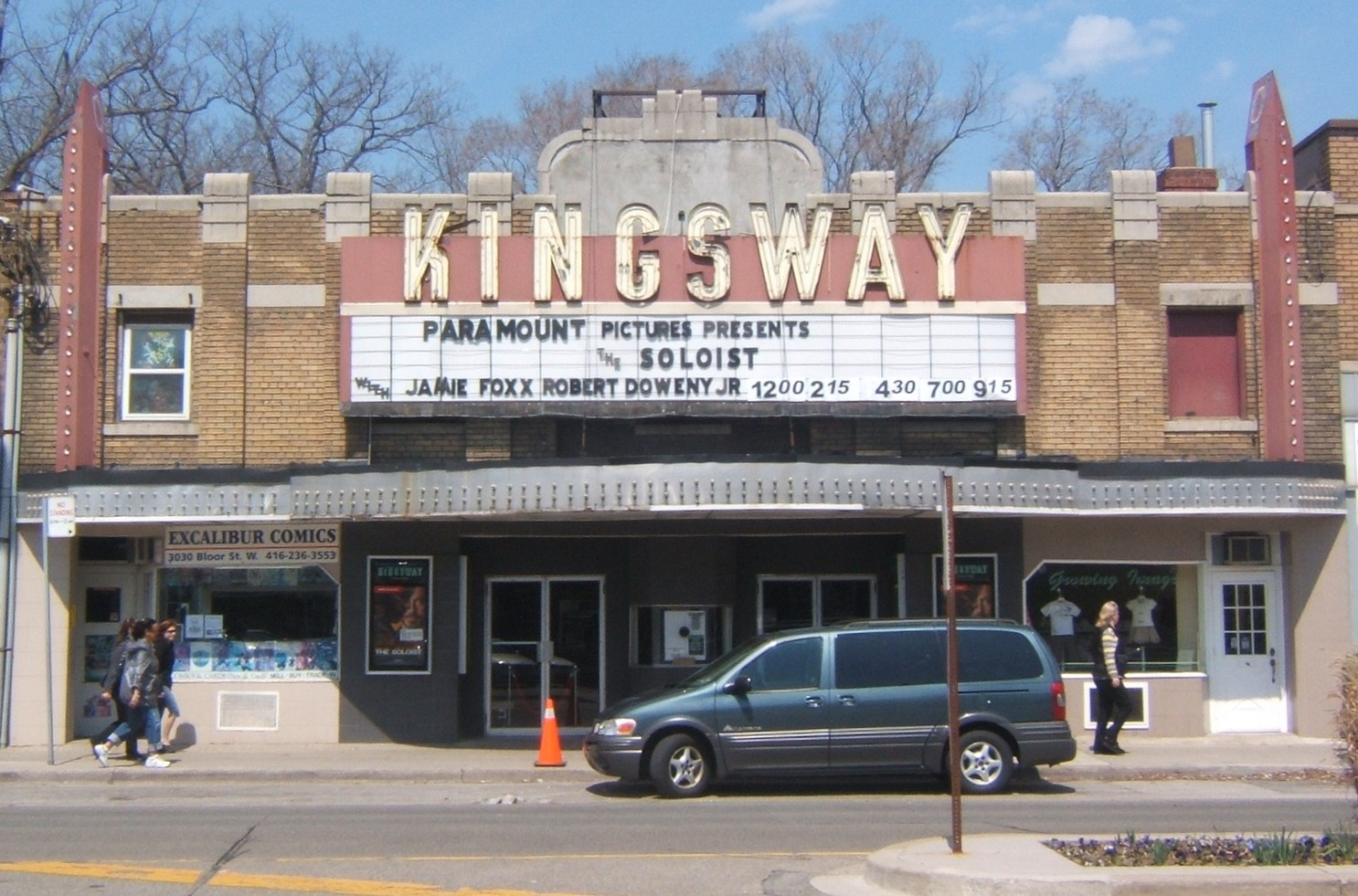
The Kingsway Theatre was reopened on 1 January 2009.

In the 1950s a series of accidents led to the creation of a highway style interchange at Royal York and Dundas, cutting the neighbourhood from the much older community of Islington to the west and the street the Kingsway from its extension to the north. Consequently, the neighbourhood along the Kingsway north of Dundas developed in a radically different way than that to the south had done. The stretch of Bloor east of Prince Edward Drive near the entrance to the street the Kingsway and the Old Mill saw the construction of many apartment buildings in this period.

The community in the Kingsway has been very successful in preserving the style of housing and atmosphere of the neighbourhood as intended by Robert Home Smith; the area contains many of Etobicoke's most prestigious addresses.

== Transportation ==
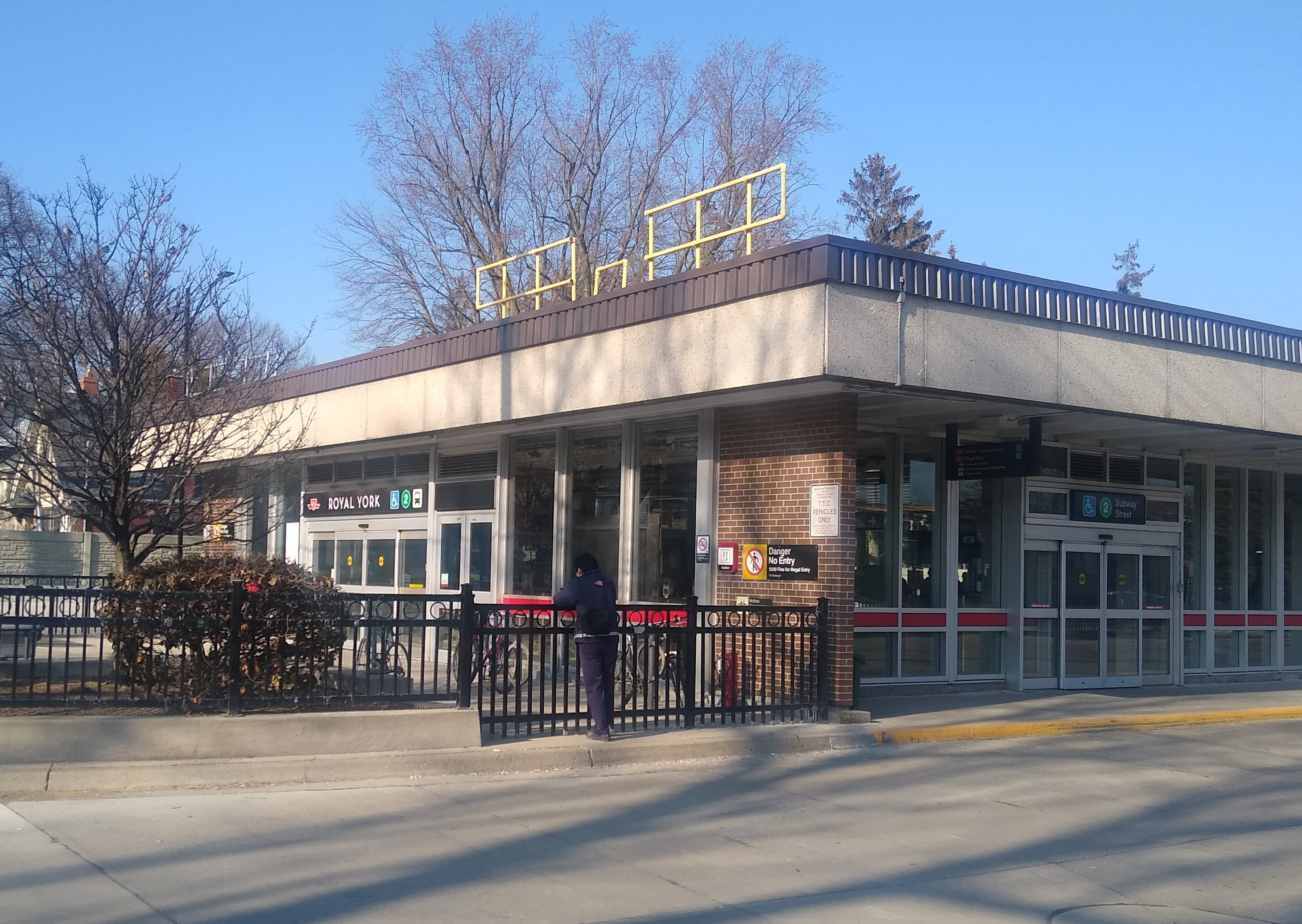
Royal York station is a subway station located in the Kingsway.

The area is served by the Royal York and Old Mill TTC subway stations. The 73 Royal York and 48 Rathburn buses run north from the Royal York station. The 66 Prince Edward bus line run north and south from the Old Mill station.

=== Main streets ===
"The Kingsway" road is a two-lane road beginning in the south-east corner of the neighbourhood from Bloor Street and extending northerly in a north-west direction past Dundas Street. Originally the Kingsway road and South Kingsway were supposed to be one continuous route, however the intended connection (including a crossing of the Humber River) was instead occupied by the westward extension of Bloor Street. South Kingsway consequently acts as a southern continuation of Jane Street, and continues south where it interchanges with the Queensway before ending at the Gardiner Expressway.

Bloor Street is the southern boundary of the neighbourhood and also a major east–west arterial roadway and commercial district. Prince Edward, a two-lane arterial roadway, runs north–south from Berry Road to Dundas Street West. Dundas Street West is the northern boundary of the neighbourhood and also a major east–west arterial roadway. There is some commercial and institutional uses along the roadway within the neighbourhood.

== Education ==
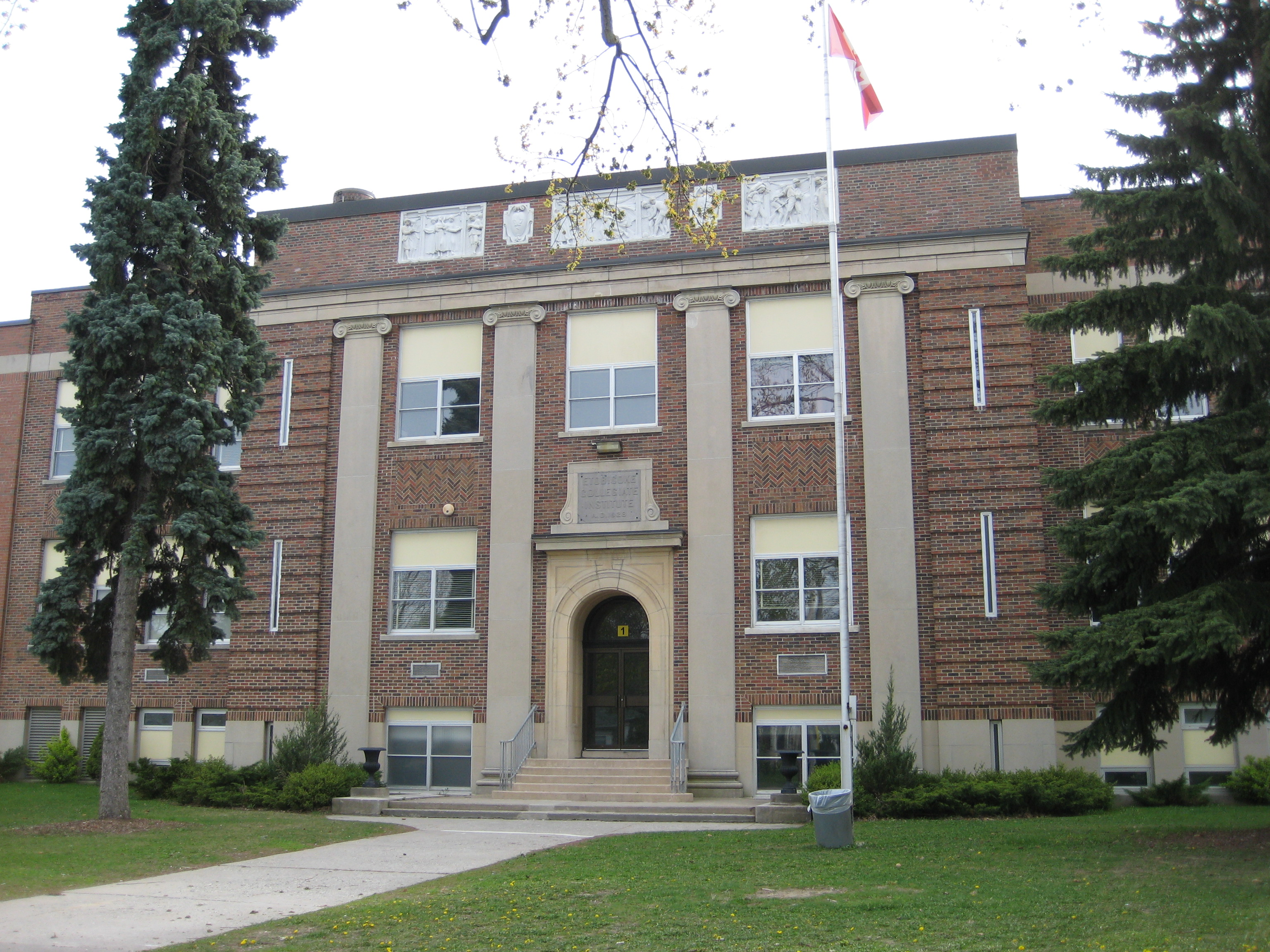
Etobicoke Collegiate Institute is a secondary school in The Kingsway.

Two public school boards operate schools in the Kingsway, the Toronto District School Board (TDSB), and the Toronto Catholic District School Board (TCDSB). The TDSB operates one secondary school in the neighbourhood, Etobicoke Collegiate Institute. The secondary school was established in the fall of 1928 and is the first and traditionally central school for Etobicoke.

Lambton-Kingsway Junior Middle School is a public elementary school on Prince Edward Drive, close to the intersection of Dundas Street West and Royal York Road. The present building opened in January 1993.

Our Lady of Sorrows Elementary School is a Catholic school situated on Montgomery Road near the intersection of Bloor Street and Royal York Road. Established in 1942 out of Etobicoke's oldest parish, Our Lady of Sorrows Roman Catholic Church, Kingsway. Our Lady of Sorrows once served much of the then largely rural, Etobicoke until post war urbanisation led to the creation of many new parishes to the north. Our Lady of Sorrows is now a feeder school for Bishop Allen Academy. The original school building was demolished from 2001 to 2002, and in 2003 the new school building was completed.

In addition to public schools, the Kingsway is also home to Kingsway College School, a private school affiliated with the Anglican Church, located at 4600 Dundas Street West.

== Institutions ==
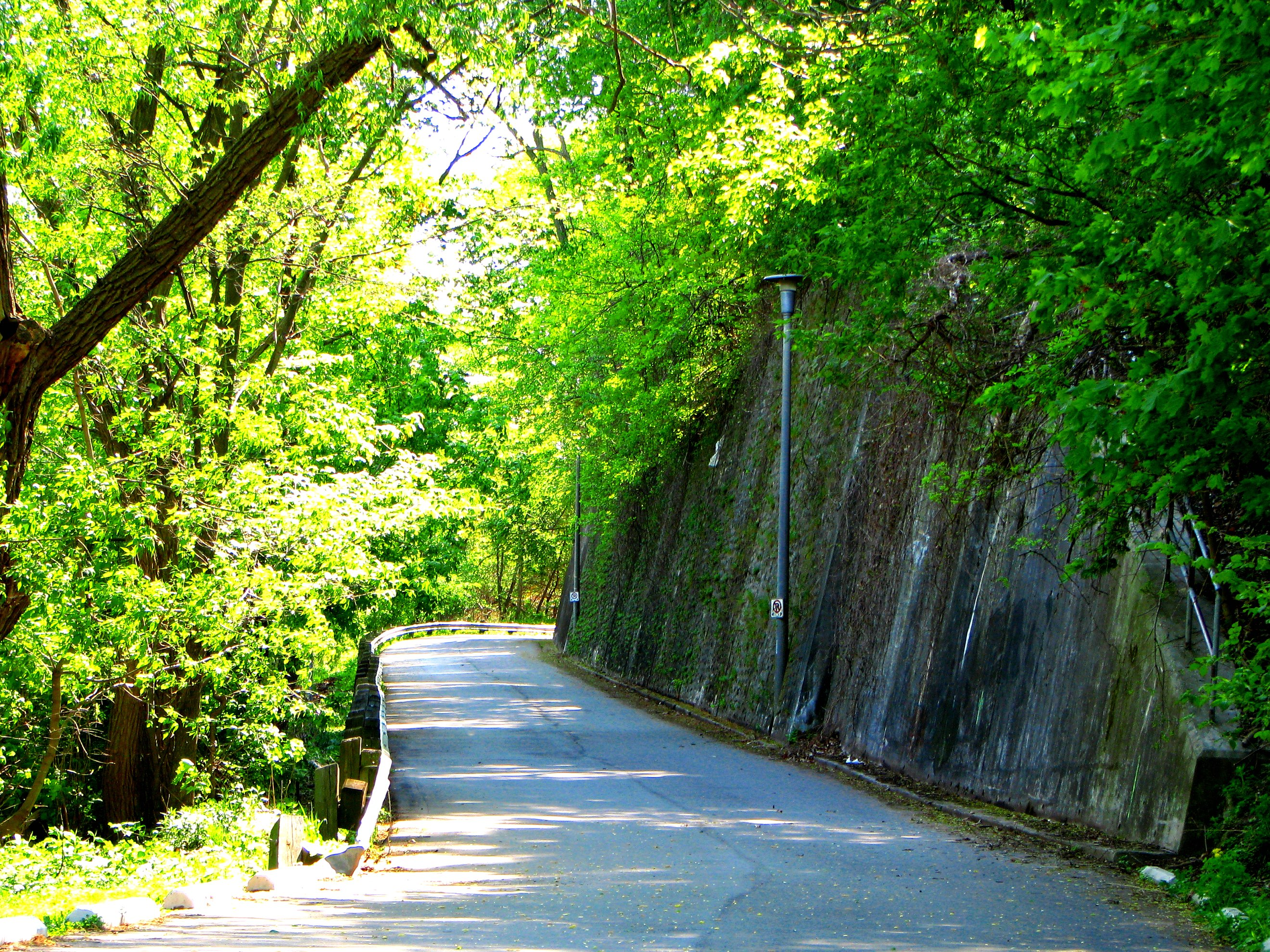
Home Smith Park is a municipal park located in the Kingsway.

- Brentwood Library
- Kingsway Mills Shopping Plaza
- Park Lawn Cemetery
- Home Smith Park
- Kings Mill Park

=== Churches ===
- Kingsway Baptist Church
- Kingsway-Lambton United Church
- Royal York Road United Church
- All Saints Anglican Church
- Our Lady of Sorrows Roman Catholic Church
- St.Georges on the Hill, Anglican Church

== See also ==
- List of neighbourhoods in Toronto
