= Royal York Road =

Thoroughfare in Toronto, Ontario

Coordinates: 43.6550°N 79.5147°W

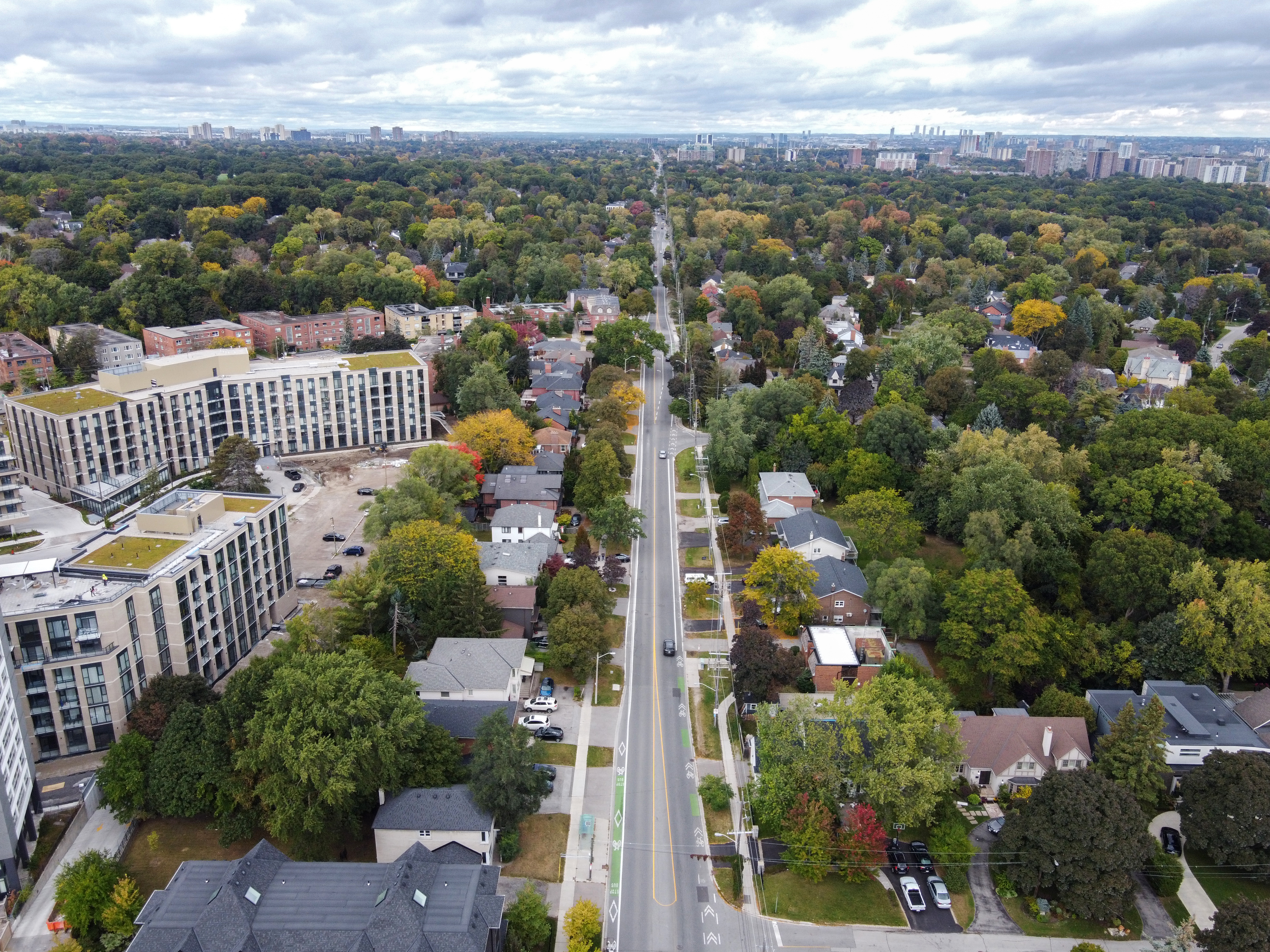
- Royal York Road near Aberdeen On The Kingsway in 2023

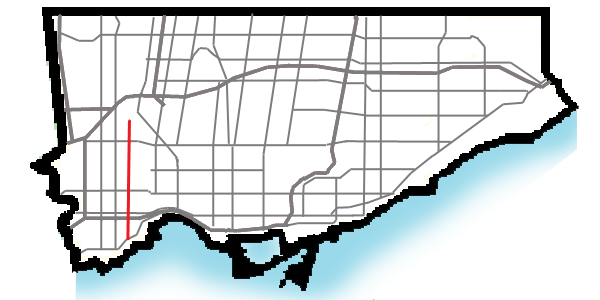
- Maintained by: City of Toronto government
- Length: 11.2 km (7.0 mi)
- Location: Toronto
- South end: Lake Shore Boulevard
- Major junctions: Gardiner Expressway; The Queensway; Bloor Street; Dundas Street; Eglinton Avenue
- North end: Dixon Road

Other
Nearby arterial roads in Toronto
← Islington Avenue	Scarlett Road →

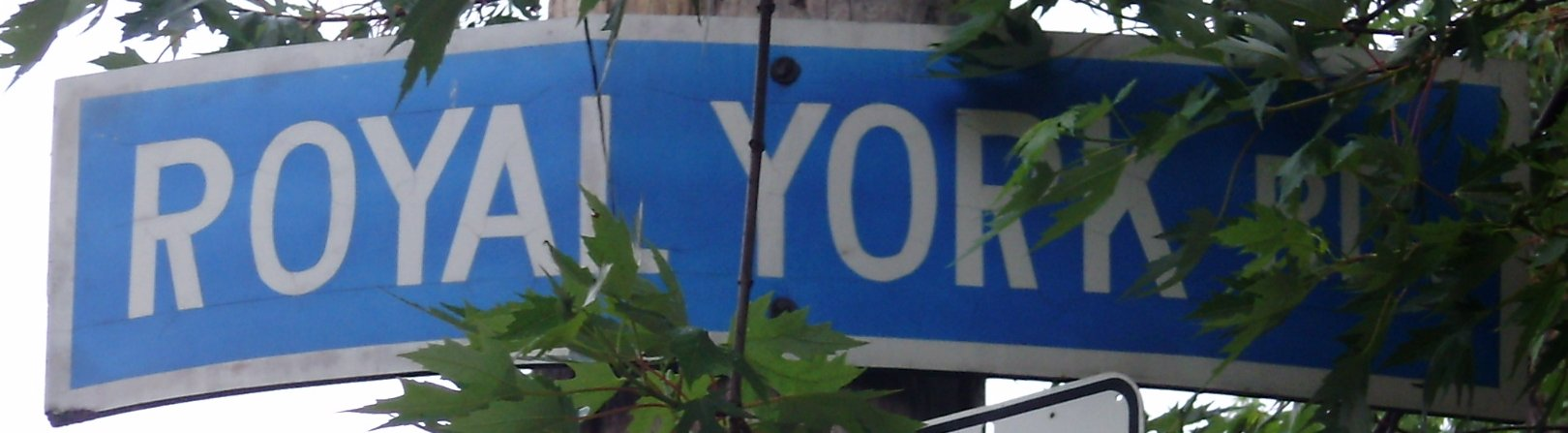
A sign for Royal York Road in Mimico, near its southern terminus.

Royal York Road, historically known as Church Street or New Church Street, is a north–south arterial road in Toronto, Ontario, Canada. It is a concession road, 5 concessions (10 km) west of Yonge Street, and runs through many residential neighbourhoods, most notably Mimico and the Kingsway. It is classified as a "minor arterial" road by the city of Toronto.

The road begins in the south near the shoreline of Lake Ontario, just south of Lake Shore Blvd. It then travels through the neighbourhoods of Mimico, the Queensway, Sunnylea, the Kingsway, and Humber Valley Village. It also serves as the boundary for two neighbourhoods north of Eglinton Avenue; Richview, and Humber Heights. The road crosses three creeks; Mimico Creek, and two tributaries of the Humber River; Humber Creek, and Silver Creek.

Royal York Road officially ends at Dixon Road, but its alignment continues further north as St. Phillips Road, which ends at Weston Road. Weston Road north of St. Phillips continues north on the same general alignment as Royal York, eventually leading into Vaughan.

== History ==
Royal York Road is named after the Royal York Hotel Golf Club that was opened in Etobicoke in 1929 by the Canadian Pacific Railway. The railway created the exclusive golf club to attract wealthy travellers accustomed to staying at the King Edward Hotel to its new Royal York Hotel in downtown Toronto instead. Prior to 1930, the road had been called Church Street due to the number of churches along it, and was originally surveyed as Concession B, starting from the Town of Mimico.

== Public transit ==
The Toronto Transit Commission provides bus services along Royal York Road. Royal York subway station on the Bloor-Danforth line is the major transit terminal that these services feed into. North of Bloor, the main route is 73 Royal York, which also goes along Albion Road in the Rexdale area, and south of Bloor, the primary route is 76 Royal York South, which mainly carries commuters from Mimico. There are two additional routes that serve parts of Royal York because they use it to feed into the subway. These routes are; 48 Rathburn (which uses Royal York from Bloor to Anglesey), and 15 Evans (Bloor to Evans).

The Mimico GO Station on the Lakeshore West line provides commuter rail service to downtown, and other areas in the Greater Toronto Area, such as Hamilton, and Oakville.

== Landmarks ==
Local landmarks along Royal York Road (north to south):

- Sanctuary Park Cemetery
- Riverside Cemetery
- Royal York Plaza
- All Saints Catholic elementary school
- Scarlett Heights Entrepreneurial Academy
- Lambton Mills Cemetery
- Humbertown Shopping Centre
- Royal York subway station
- École Sainte-Marguerite d'Youville Catholic elementary school
- Bishop Allen Academy
- Etobicoke School of the Arts
- Mimico GO Station

== See also ==
Major streets in Toronto which intersect with Royal York (north to south):

- Dixon Road
- Lawrence Avenue
- Eglinton Avenue
- Dundas Street West
- Bloor Street
- The Queensway
- Lake Shore Boulevard
